= Konditorei =

Business that sells pastries

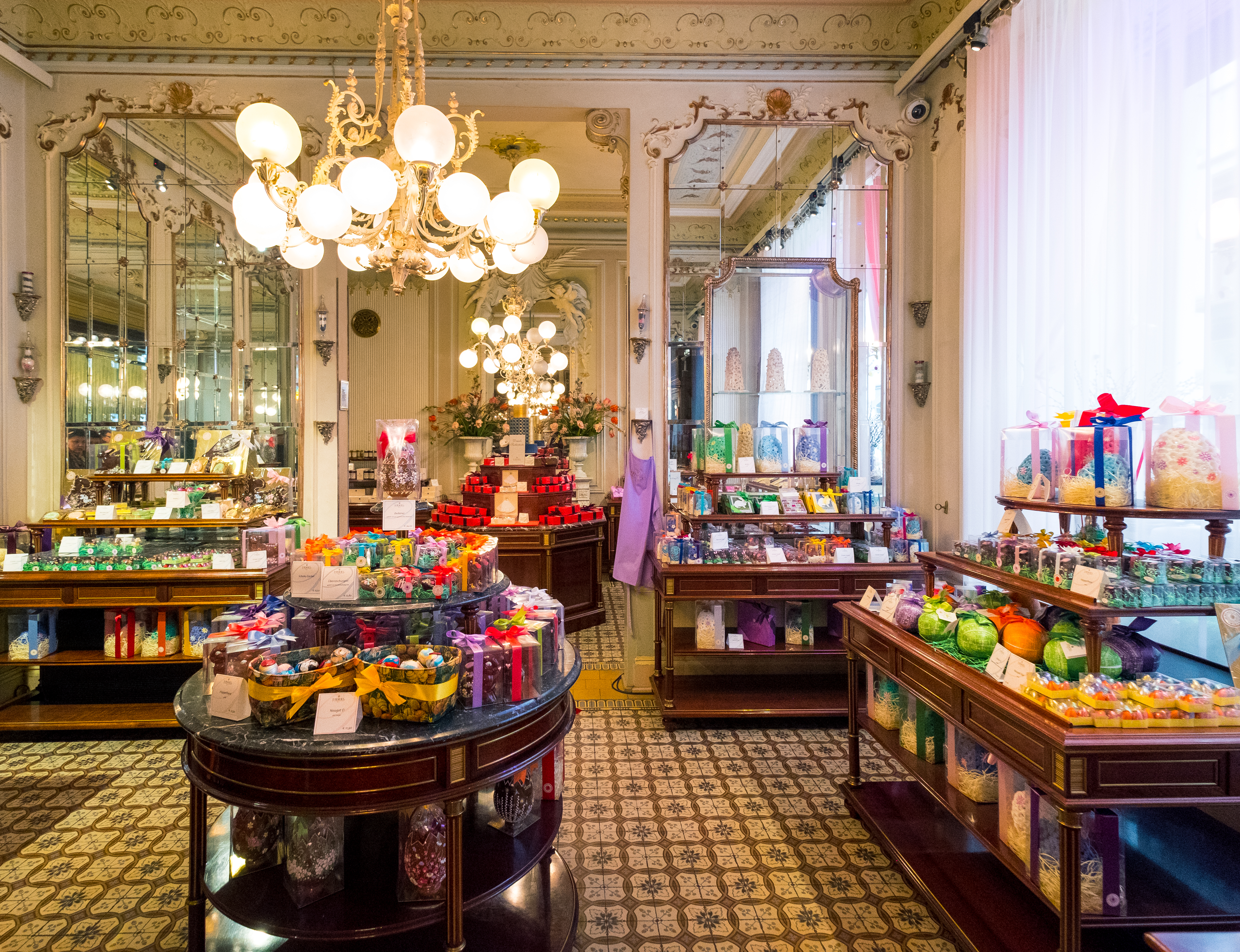
Interior of Konditorei Demel in Vienna, Austria

A Konditorei is a business that typically bakes and sells a wide variety of pastries, cake and desserts, and typically also serves as a café. They differ from an ordinary bakery or coffeehouse mainly due to the focus on pastry and fine baked goods instead of bread or everyday baked goods.

Konditoreien (plural) are found in many countries including but not limited to Germany, Austria, Switzerland, France, Denmark, Sweden, and the Czech Republic. In French-speaking countries, similar businesses are referred to as pâtisseriess. In Spanish, they may be known as confiterías.

The culture and function of the Konditorei may vary based on locations. In Germany, Austria, Switzerland and several northern European countries, it is customary to consume a portion of cake with coffee or hot chocolate on the premises.

In order to become a Konditor (pastry chef), the speciality baker for a Konditorei, the profession (in many countries) requires an extensive apprenticeship or specialty training program.

== Function ==
The primary focus of a Konditorei is baking and selling pastries, which may be made in-house or brought in from another bakery. They commonly also offer a selection of coffees, soft drinks, and many may also sell alcoholic drinks. Many larger Konditoreien also serve ice cream and chocolates.

Konditorei pastries and related products

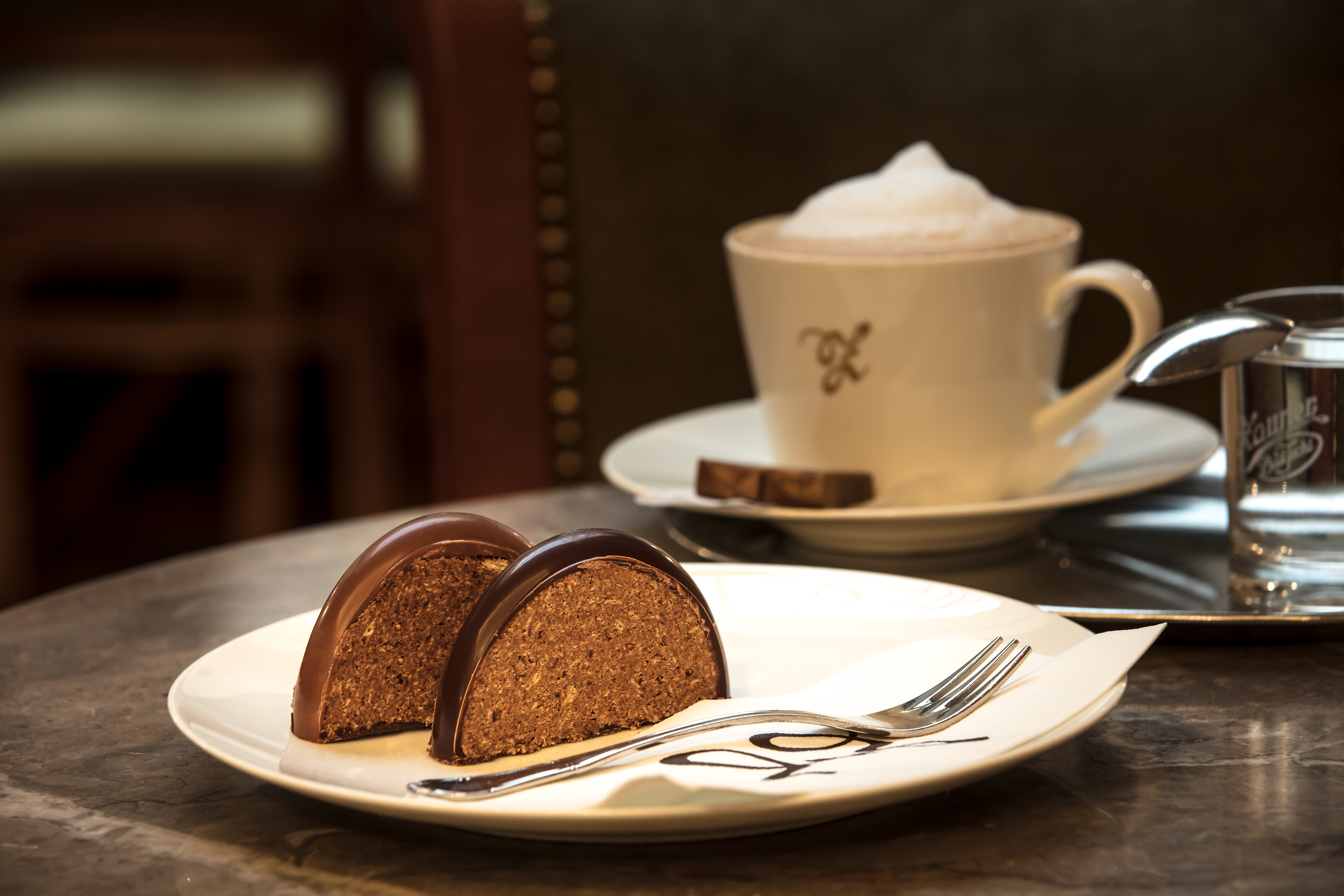
Coffee and chocolate-glazed cake

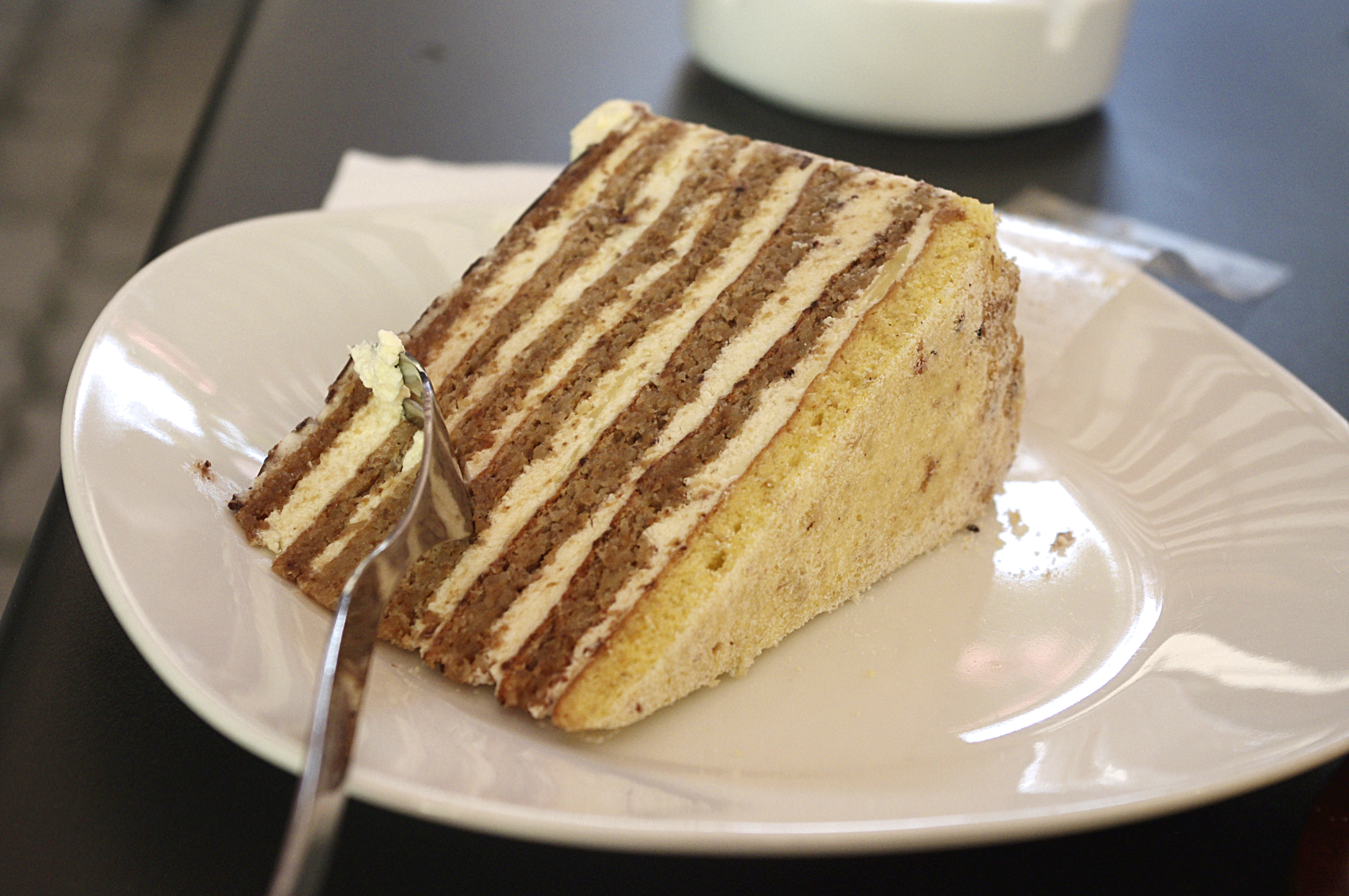
Torte (a Hungarian Esterházy torte)

Baumkuchen

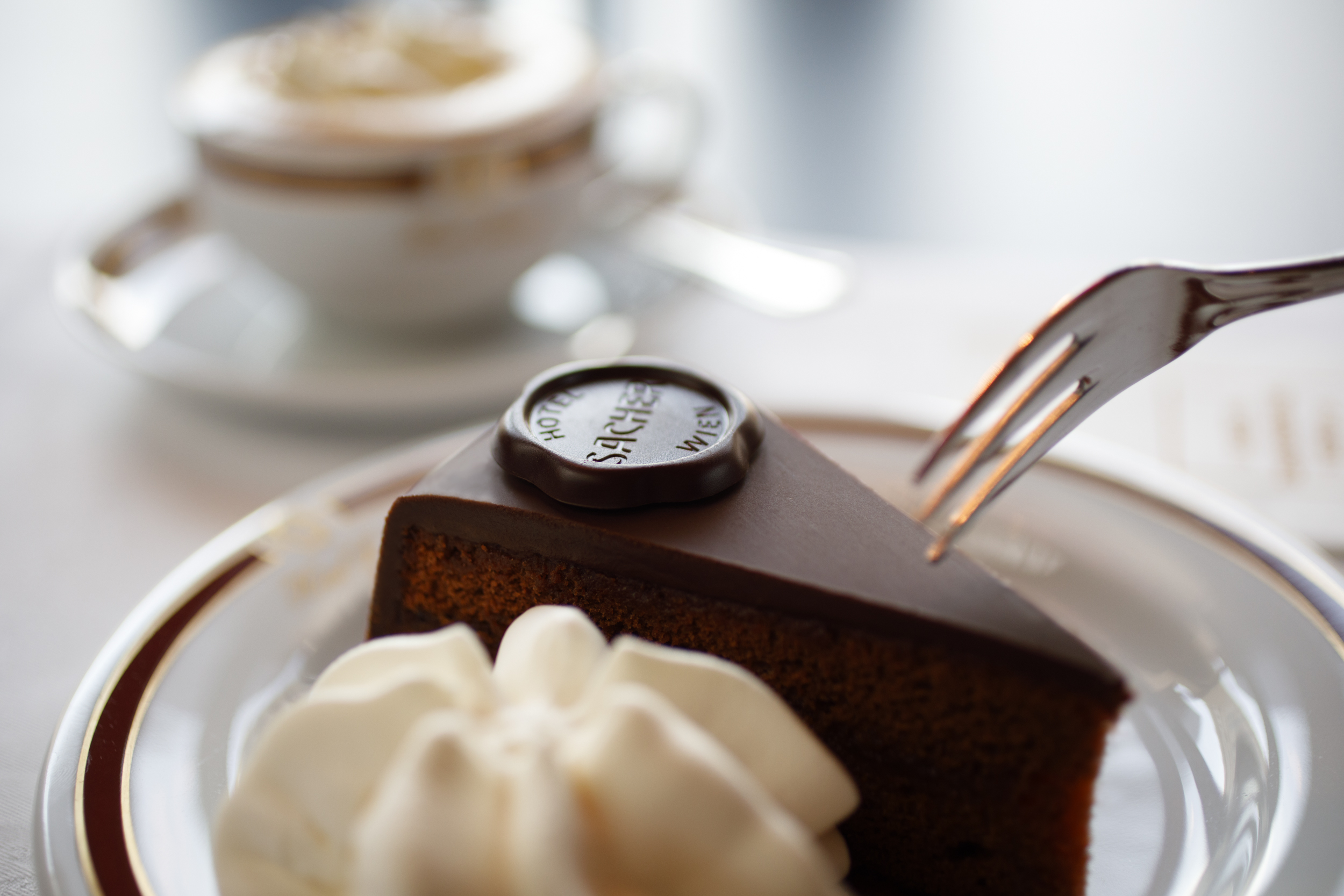
Sachertorte

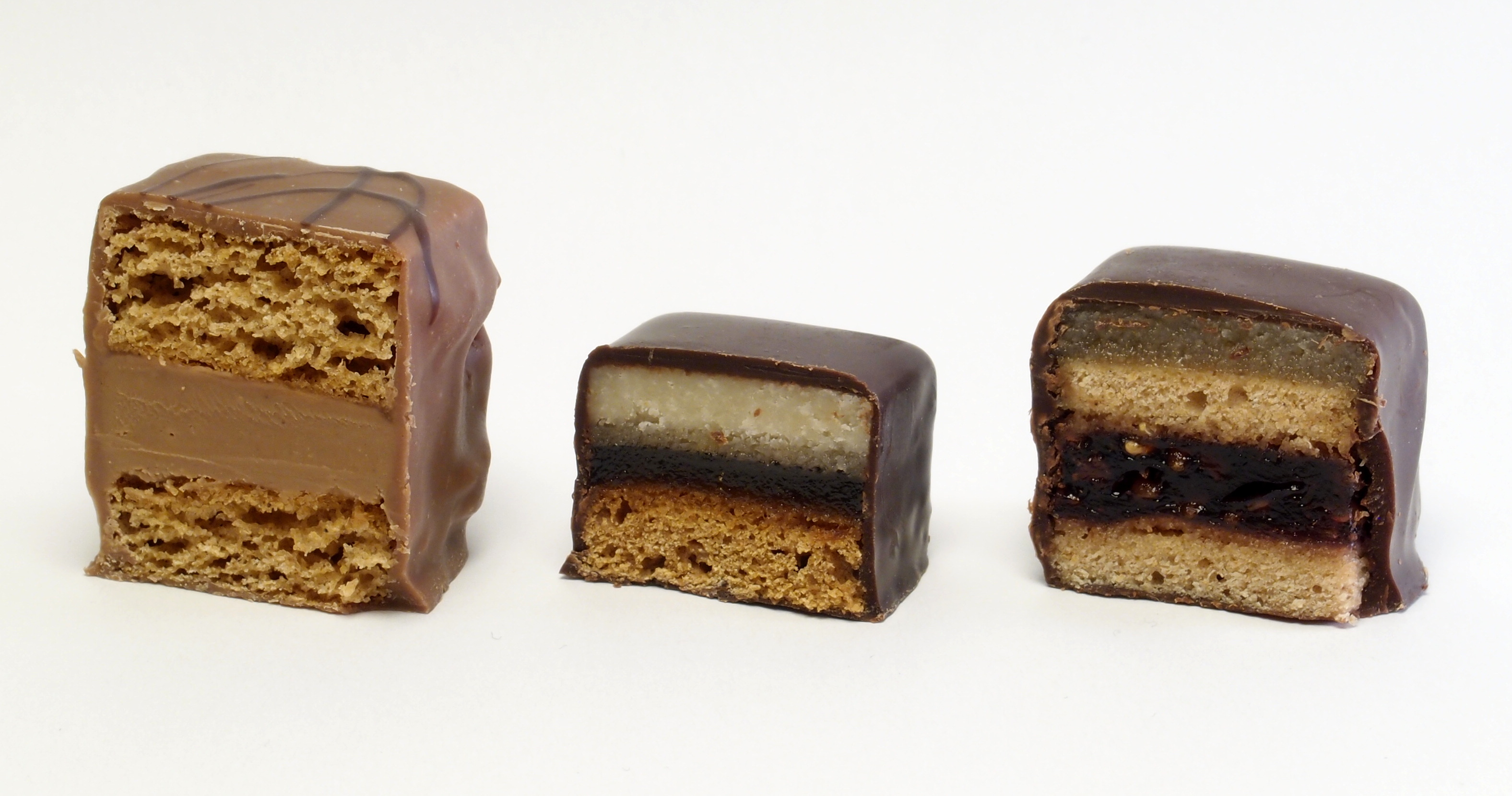
Dominosteine (similar to petit fours)

Marzipan for Easter

Apart from its typical menu, a Konditorei chiefly differs from a restaurant in that opening hours tend to be morning and afternoon, rather than afternoon and evening.

Konditorei activities and appearance

Pastries made in house

Interior of a Konditorei in Austria

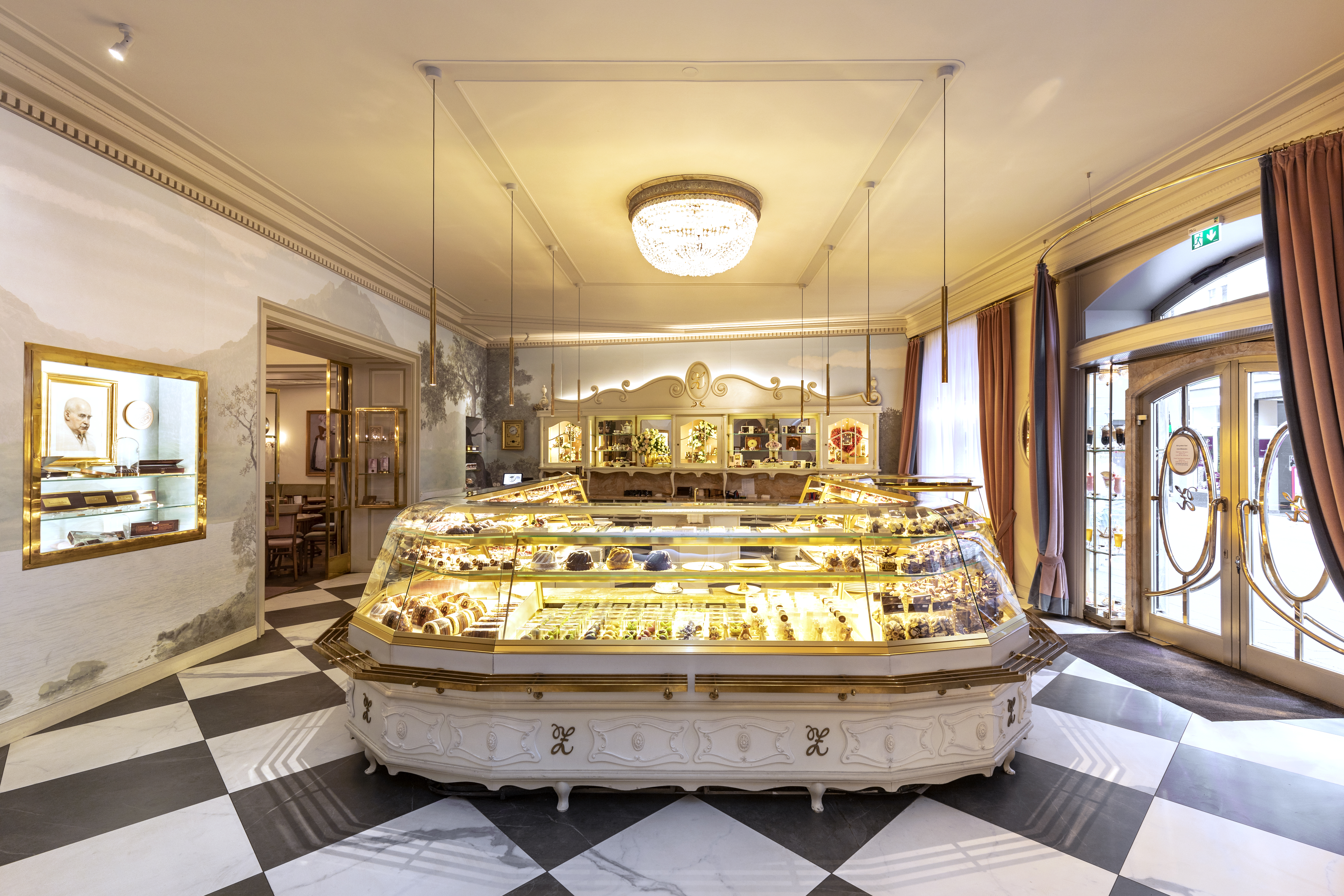
Konditorei Zauner in Bad Ischl

Exterior of a Konditorei in Vienna

== Etymology ==
A Konditorei puts emphasis on the artistic aspect of the trade and, unlike a bakery, does not produce breadstuffs. The craft developed when particular bakers specialised in the creation of sweet bread to which candied fruits and other sweet ingredients were added. The origin of the word Konditor (the Konditorei's baker) stems from the Latin word candire, which stands for “candying of fruits”. Another derivation is the Latin word conditura (condio), meaning to concoct (food) or preserve (fruits).

Konditorei is the German word for a pâtisserie or pastry shop. In Sweden, Norway and Denmark, the term konditori is used and the term konditor for a pastry chef has been used since the beginning of the 18th century.

In the Czech Republic, such shops are usually called cukrárna (sugar shop), while in Poland their equivalents are known as cukiernia (same meaning); both terms derive from a common Slavic root related to sugar (cukr, cukier), itself ultimately borrowed from Latin saccharum (via Greek σάκχαρον). A related Hungarian term is cukrászda, which, although formed within Hungarian, is based on cukor (“sugar”), a loanword of Slavic origin, combined with cukrász (“confectioner”), a term etymologically related (though not directly derived) to German Konditor.

== History and development of the Konditor ==
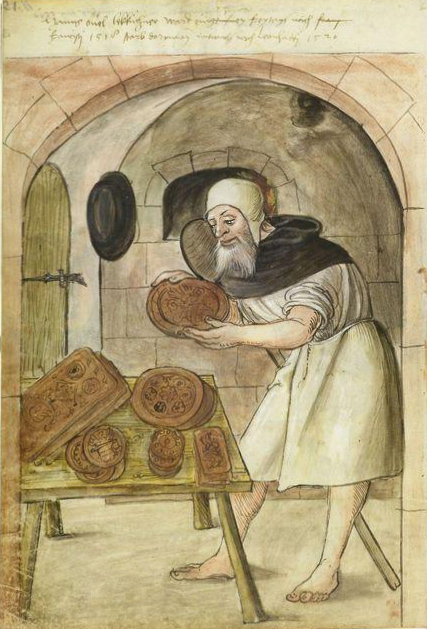
Depiction of a Lebkuchen baker, Nuremberg, c. 1520

=== Lebkuchen ===
The profession of the Konditor developed from that of the baker. Once the bakers of medieval times (15th century) mastered the art of baking bread, some started to enrich the dough with honey, dried fruits and spices. These specialists called themselves Lebküchler, Lebküchner or Lebzelter. They founded a guild in 1643 in the area in and around Nürnberg, Germany. At the same time, the Lebkuchen bakers ran a second trade using wax, a side product of honey: they became chandlers, supplying churches and private households with artistic candles, wax figures and pictures made of wax. They carved wooden molds themselves and used these to pour magnificent pictures made of wax. A few Konditoreien practiced the sophisticated art of the chandlers until recent times. The Lebküchner were turned to confectioners later and finally became Konditoreien.

=== Sugar and spices ===
The maritime trade brought spices and sugar from the Eastern world to the famous Italian harbor towns of Genoa and Venice. Although sugar had an immense appeal, only the rich were privileged to consume it. The profession of confectioner was related to that of the pharmacist because the trade with sugar was exclusive to pharmacists. The German word “Konfekt” (English: confection) to describe sweets stems from the language of the drug makers, which were also called confectionari.

=== Production of marzipan ===
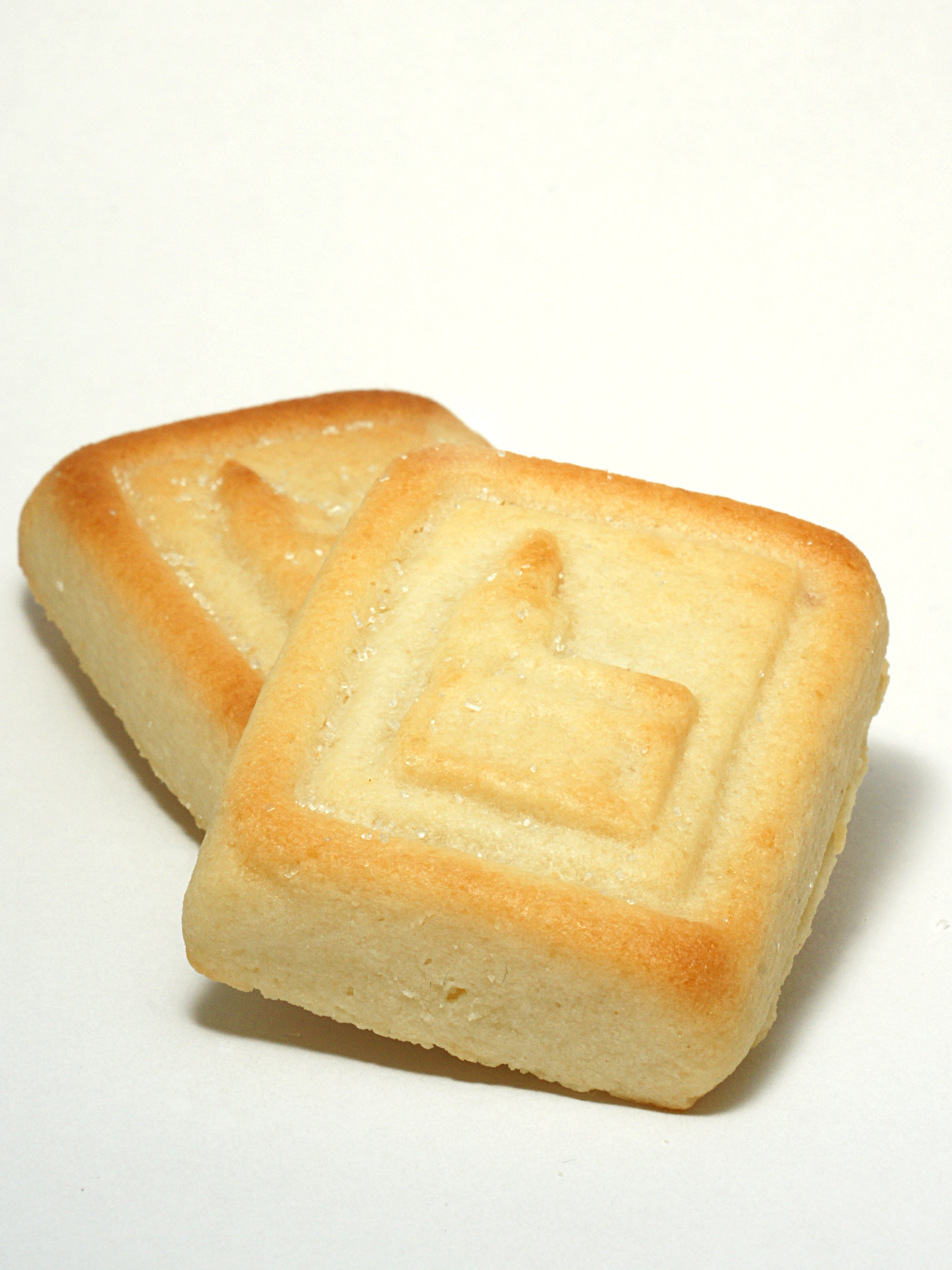
Frankfurter Brenten are a type of molded, baked marzipan.

In the 14th century, the Venetians introduced marzipan, a confection made from almonds, sugar and rose water, to central Europe. Marzipan was an ideal material for moulding magnificent pictures from, which were artistically painted with plant colouring and often decorated with gold leaf.

=== Chocolate ===
At the start of the 19th century, chocolate first made its way to Germany, after the ladies of the upper classes in Spain, Italy and France had long been used to a daily cup of hot chocolate. When the Dutchman Coenraad Johannes van Houten managed to press out the cocoa mass, the additional ingredients cocoa butter and cocoa powder were created. The chocolate thinned with cocoa butter was used to pour a variety of figures, and painting cakes with cocoa powder became popular. The trade of the chocolatier, a Konditor specialised in working with chocolate, was born. Chocolate now played a major role in the Konditorei. A good example is the chocolate cake created by Franz Sacher, who was the chocolate cook for Klemens von Metternich in Vienna in 1832.

=== Pastries ===
Apple strudel

The abundance of sugar through the native sugar beet in the 19th century lead to the development of cakes and pastries, with focus taken off decorative art. Light sponge cakes, almond pastries, apple strudel or milk-cream strudel, Gugelhupf, and cream cakes were served with then modern drinks such as coffee, tea and chocolate.

== Notable konditors ==
- Nicolas Appert, French inventor of food preservation
- Heinrich Georg Erbshäuser, Munich baker and inventor of Prinzregententorte
- Johann Zauner (1803–1868)
- Anton Gerstner
- Christoph Demel
- Ludwig Heiner
- Louis Lehmann
- Wilhelm J. Sluka (1861–1932)
- Anton Rumpelmayer (1832–1914)
- Amaury Guichon (* 1991)
- Natalie Sideserf (* 1985)

== See also ==
- Bakery
- Coffeehouse
- Schlagobers, Richard Strauss' ballet, set in a konditorei
