= Sachertorte =

Chocolate cake

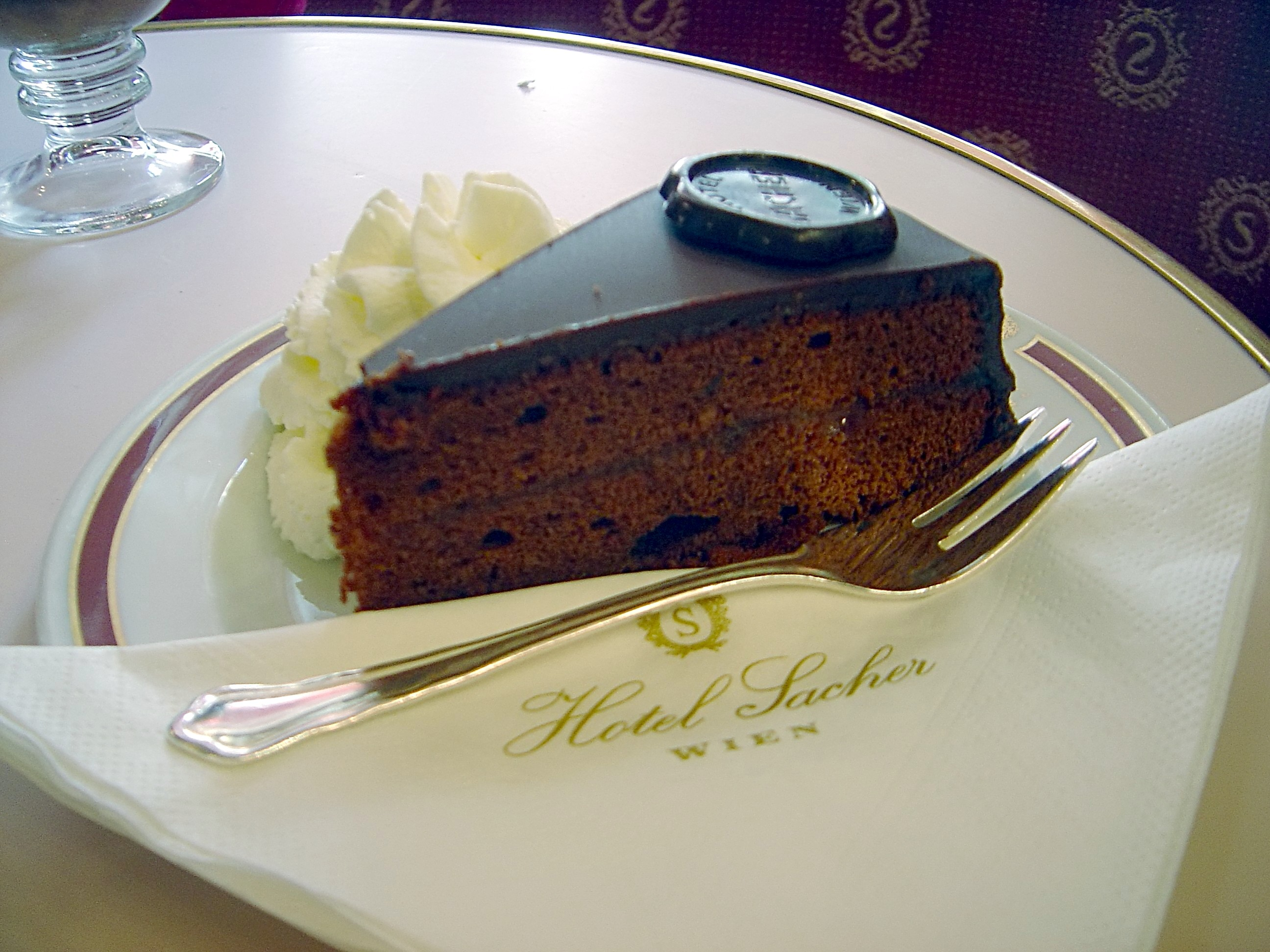
- Sachertorte from the Hotel Sacher, Vienna
- Place of origin: Austrian Empire
- Created by: Franz Sacher
- Invented: mid-19th century
- Main ingredients: Chocolate sponge cake, apricot jam, chocolate glaze

Sachertorte (Note: UK: /ˈzæxərtɔːrtə/ ZAKH-ər-tor-tə, US: /ˈsɑːkərtɔːrt/ SAH-kər-tort, German: [ˈzaxɐˌtɔʁtə], Austrian German: [ˈsaxɐˌtɔrtɛ]) is a sponge cake that combines chocolate sponge, apricot jam, and a chocolate glaze. It was invented by the Austrian confectioner Franz Sacher in the mid-19th century. The ingredients include butter, chocolate, eggs, flour, and sugar.

In Vienna, the Hotel Sacher and Demel pastry shop dominate the market for Sachertorte. In the 20th century, they fought over its ownership, trademark, and how many layers of sponge the original contained, with Hotel Sacher favouring two and Demel one. The cakes had the same basic ingredients, but the exact recipes were kept secret.

The reputation of Sachertorte varies by geography. It is common in Austria and other German-speaking countries and typically regarded positively, with its elements seen as well balanced. In other areas, it has a different reputation: it is often regarded in France as being too sweet and lacking in chocolate flavour, while many people in the US consider it dry and not sweet enough.

== Description ==
Sachertorte is a chocolate sponge cake, distinguished by one or more layers of apricot jam and a chocolate glaze. Its name is regulated in Austria by the Austrian food codex (Latin: Codex Alimentarius), which defines Sachertorte as made from a batter of butter, flour, eggs, sugar, and at least 15% chocolate by weight. It permits flavourings such as salt, vanilla, and rum; it also allows almonds, hazelnuts, and walnuts if reflected in the name. Apricot jam is another key component.

The Hotel Sacher website gives one method of making Sachertorte with these ingredients, combining melted chocolate, egg yolks, butter, vanilla, and icing sugar into a batter, with flour and a meringue of egg whites and sugar folded in before baking; the creaming introduces air into the batter. As a result, characteristic bubbles appear throughout the final cake, occasionally breaking the surface.

Sachertorte is made with one or more sponge layers: at Demel, a bakery in Vienna, it has historically been made with only one, while at Hotel Sacher it is made with two. Contemporary (American) recipes for home cooks are for two or three layers. Apricot jam is spread over the top of the sponge, and between the layers in multi-layer versions. While versions using strawberry, raspberry, and peach exist in Vienna, they cannot be called Sachertorte. The Codex also specifies the glaze, which is poured over the cake and sets to a fudge-like consistency. To produce a smooth surface, some bakers use tins with rounded edges that allow the glaze to flow evenly over the sides.

In Austria, the word Sacher is often written across the top of the cake, and at Demel and Hotel Sacher it is finished with a chocolate seal—triangular and circular respectively. Sachertorte is served in Austria with a dollop of unsweetened whipped cream on the side; Elisabeth Gürtler, the former director of Hotel Sacher, recommends pairing it with champagne. Due to its high butter content, Sachertorte can be stored at room temperature.

The word Sachertorte combines the name of its creator, Franz Sacher, and torte, a German word for a filled layer cake. The spelling varies: Hotel Sacher favours Sacher-Torte, while Sachertorte remains the generic form in Austria, though the spaced form Sacher torte is also common. The word Sachertorte entered English in the early 20th century. (Note: The earliest use identified by the Oxford English Dictionary appears in 1906 in Mrs. Beeton's Book of Household Management.)

== History ==
=== Origin ===
Sachertorte was invented in the early-to-mid 19th century by Franz Sacher, a chef who worked in the Austrian Empire. As a teenager, Sacher served in Vienna for Prince Metternich. In one story, Sacher invented Sachertorte in 1832 for Metternich and his friends, at which point Sacher was 15 or 16 and in his second year of apprenticeship. Accounts sometimes elaborate on this: in one, the prince had requested a dry, "masculine" cake rather than the fluffy, "feminine" cakes that were then common; in another, famous account, Sacher first sought advice from his sister before creating the cake.

The 1832 dating is supported by comments made by Sacher's son Eduard, who stated in 1888 that Sachertorte was created for and enjoyed by Metternich; several food writers have since given the same origin. One alternative timeline was provided by Sacher in a 1906 newspaper profile, in which he attributed the creation to the 1840s at the restaurant and catering business he ran in Pressburg (modern-day Bratislava, Slovakia). (Note: The historian Ingrid Haslinger summarises this interview as Sacher saying the cake was created around 1849 or 1850, after the Revolutions of 1848 had concluded and he was able to return to Vienna.) With no contemporary documentation confirming either account, the food writer Michael Krondl summarises the dispute as between what to believe: "the memory of the nonagenarian inventor [Sacher] or the promotional efforts of his hotelier son [Eduard]".

Around two centimetres (0.8 inches) tall, the original Sachertorte was thinner than contemporary versions and required a shorter baking time. According to Krondl, Sacher modelled this Sachertorte on the chocolate biscuit—a class of sponge cakes that were baked once rather than twice. Maier-Bruck identifies a different inspiration, arguing that Sacher was working in an Austrian tradition of chocolate cakes that had emerged in the early 18th century. Like Sachertorte, some of these cakes included an icing.

=== Spread ===
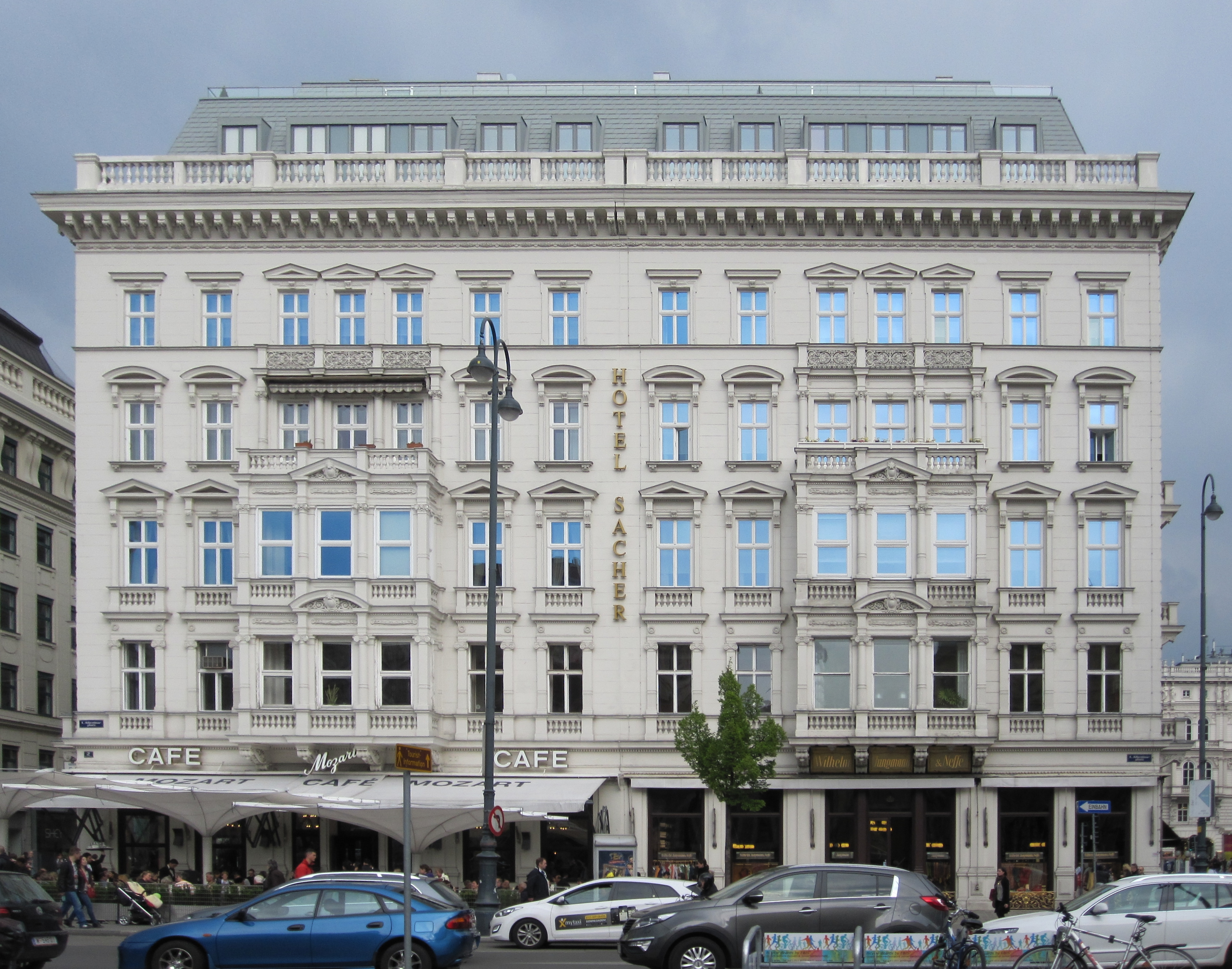
Hotel Sacher, pictured in 2014

The cookbook writer Katharina Prato was one of the first to promote Sachertorte, publishing a recipe for "A Chocolate Cake. A La Sacher" in 1867 or 1870, in the sixth or seventh edition of her book Die Süddeutsche Küche. (Note: It is sometimes reported that the recipe appears in the first edition in 1858, but this is not true. It does appear in the seventh, in 1870, and may appear in the sixth.) The cake she described was made in a single layer from chocolate, butter, eggs, sugar, and flour, and, once baked, had apricot sauce and chocolate glaze spread over the top.

When Eduard opened Hotel Sacher in 1876, Sachertorte was on the menu. Recipes continued to appear in Austrian cookbooks in the late 19th and early 20th century, including in the later works of Prato, and those of Louise Seleskowitz, Klara Fuchs, Anna Bauer, and Marie von Rokitansky. Leopold Rosner and Robert Habs featured Sachertorte in the Appetit-Lexikons (1894), as did Olga and Adolf Hess with a similar recipe in Viennese Cuisine (1913), claiming that their recipe was provided by Anna Sacher, Eduard's spouse.

As Sachertorte gained popularity in Vienna, its fame surpassed that of Linzer torte. In the late 1880s, Sachertorte was being shipped to cities in Europe including Paris, Berlin, and London, as well as to countries overseas. The definition of Sachertorte became legally set when it was added to the Austrian food codex in 1894. The following year, it was referenced in a guidebook to Vienna, describing the "famous Sacher Torte with its chocolate brown dress, which is the delight of gourmets the world over." By the 1930s, it was made in many versions, ranging in thickness and including ingredients such as rum, potato flour, almonds and breadcrumbs.

=== Hotel Sacher v. Demel ===
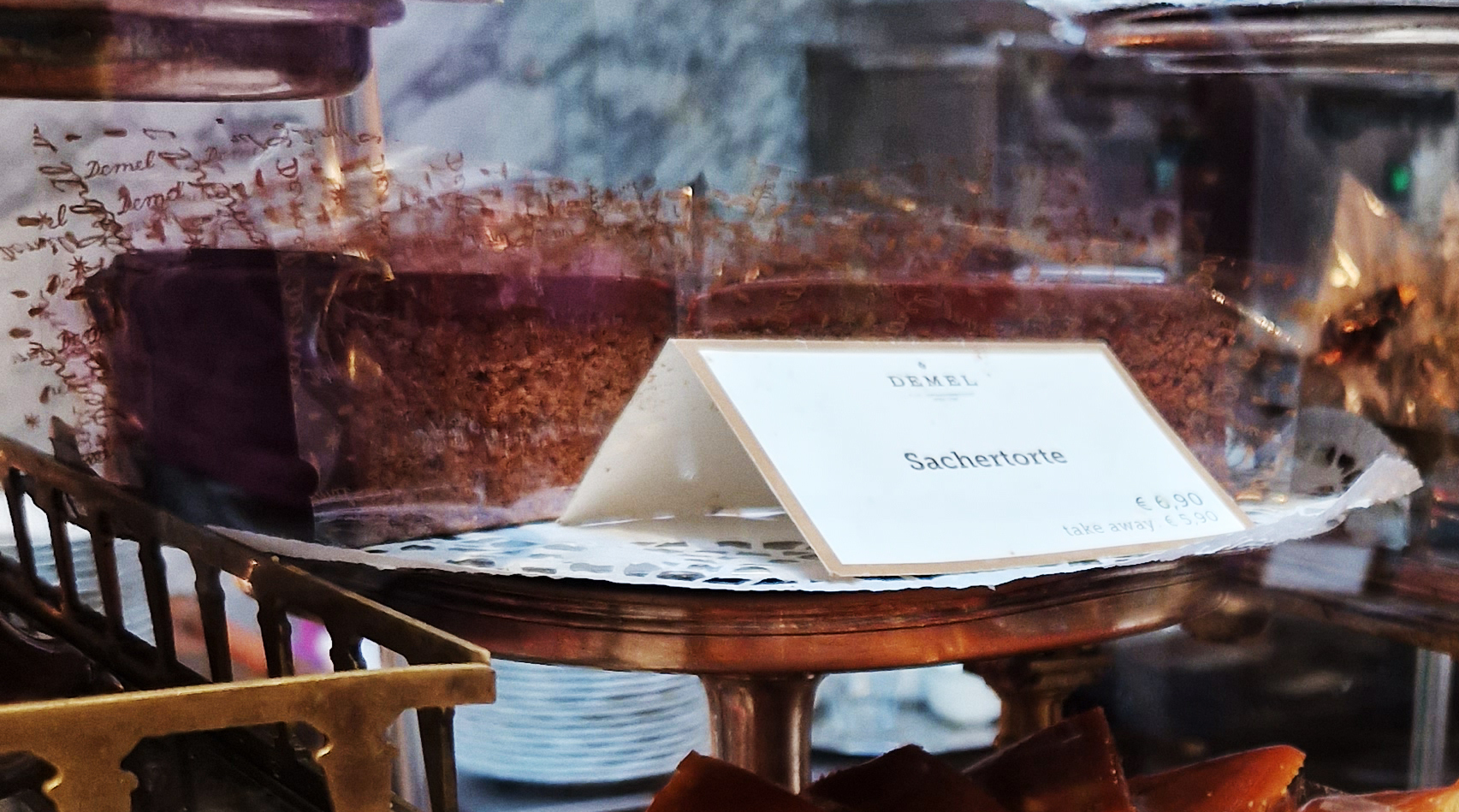
Sachertorte in the window at Demel, 2023

During the economic downturn of the 1930s, the Hotel Sacher, with its outdated infrastructure lacking running water and central heating, faced severe financial decline, and the hotel eventually declared bankruptcy. Anna and Eduard's son, Eduard Jr., sold the hotel, while independently selling the recipe to the Demel pastry shop. In 1934, Demel began retailing its own version, with a single layer, under the name "Eduard Sacher-Torte". At the Hotel Sacher, Sachertorte continued to be sold in two layers under the name "Original Sacher-Torte", drawing on the family connection.

Thence began a series of legal disputes over which could be named the original. In 1938, a lawsuit brought by one of the hotel's investors was settled in the hotel's favour. After a pause brought by World War II, the dispute resurfaced in the Austrian Supreme Court. This time, the litigation also extended to whether the original cake featured one layer of sponge, preferred by Demel, or two layers, preferred by the hotel. The dispute over ownership remained complicated as Eduard (Franz's son) had connections to both Hotel Sacher and Demel. The case ended in 1963, with the court siding with Hotel Sacher on ownership and with Demel on the number of layers. Deutsche Welle, however, reported that it was an out-of-court agreement. Since then, Demel has sold Sachertorte as "Demel's Sacher-Torte" while Hotel Sacher has continued to sell it as "Original Sacher-Torte".

== Reception ==
Critical opinion is highly favourable, such as in Germany, where it is known as "sweet, delicate, and with a flawless surface", (Note: German: süß, delikat und mit makelloser Oberfläche) and in Austria, where the author Franz Maier-Bruck writes that Sachertorte is "delicate and mild" (zart und mild), and not too soft, sweet, dry, or gritty. To Maier-Bruck, a good Sachertorte comes from the balance of its ingredients, the baking process, and the smoothness of the glaze. Outside of those regions, Sachertorte is often considered dry and too simple. The culinary writer Jane Grigson wrote in the 1980s that while she considers it one of the most famous in Europe, she does not consider it to be the best. Criticisms range by geography; Krondl writes that in the US, it is perceived as dry and insufficiently sweet, while in France, it is considered too sweet.

Several explanations have been put forward for this reputation. Defenders of Sachertorte, such as Rick Rodgers and Nicola Humble, have suggested that its poor reputation may be a result of poorly translated articles (Note: In an example, Rodgers notes that one recipe often touted as the original contains the same weight of powdered and granulated sugar. In translations, these are converted each to one cup, despite the granulated sugar being twice as dense and actually corresponding to half a cup.) or because it was served without whipped cream. Nigel Slater in The Observer attributed the reputation to a lack of appreciation for its elegant simplicity and understatement, adding that consumers confuse it with Black Forest gateau and truffle-style desserts. Cloake adds that, while complaints of a dry and simple Sachertorte may be justified in a poorly made Sachertorte, a well-made version is "soft but firm, delicately chocolatey and luscious with apricot jam, but never squidgy or gooey".

== Modern consumption ==
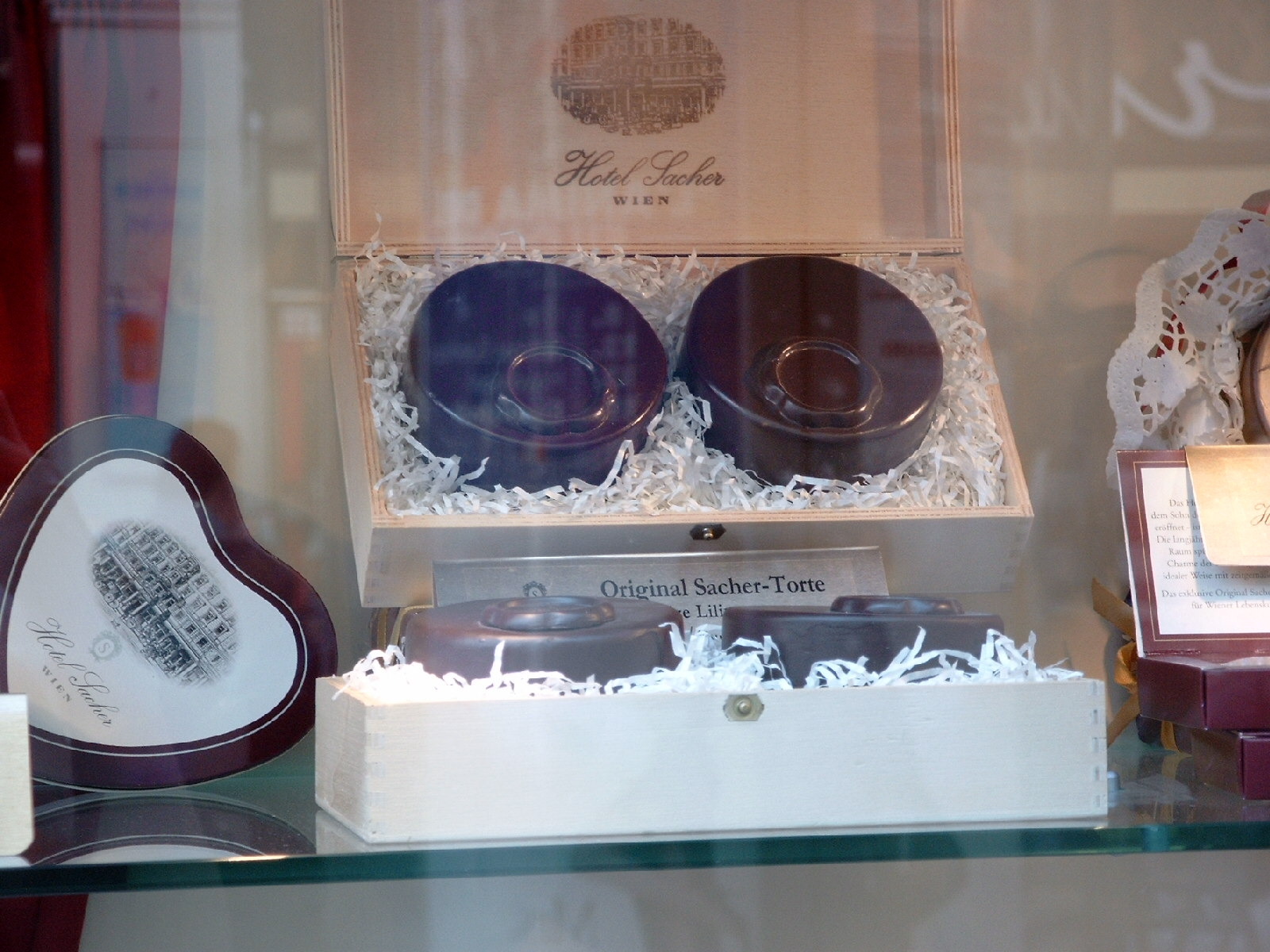
Sachertorte on display in a window

Hotel Sacher and Demel dominate the market in Vienna, though Hotel Sacher outsells Demel five to one and ships its cakes worldwide. Both keep their exact recipes secret. Hotel Sacher opened the Original Sacher Torte Manufactory in Vienna in 1999 since the bakery in the hotel was too small for the demand. In 2007, they produced 360,000 cakes a year. Its sales peak around Christmas. In 2014, Hotel Sacher employed 50 staff involved in Sachertorte production. By 2022, Demel had switched to making its Sachertorte in two layers.

Other pastry shops and restaurants in Vienna have tried to replicate the original Sachertorte or introduce their own interpretations, including variants featuring a taller profile divided into three distinct sponge layers. Cookbooks in Austria often include at least one Sachertorte recipe, sometimes with three or four variations. The cake features prominently on the Viennese tourist circuit, where it is frequently purchased as a culinary souvenir and packaged for international transit.

Sachertorte is popular in Austria, as well as in other German-speaking countries, particularly during festive periods. According to Maier-Bruck, it is served at Buckingham Palace and to the French presidency. Outside Europe, McDonald's Japan served Sachertorte from the mid-2010s to at least 2021.

== Sources ==
- Becker, Gerhard (Autumn 1992). "German Loanwords Related to Foods and Drinks". Die Unterrichtspraxis / Teaching German. 25 (2): 198–207. doi:10.2307/3531920.
- Goldstein, Darra, ed. (2015). The Oxford Companion to Sugar and Sweets. Oxford University Press. ISBN 978-0-19-931339-6.
  - Faissner, Waltraud. "Linzer Torte". In Goldstein (2015), pp. 405–406.
  - Krondl, Michael. "Sachertorte". In Goldstein (2015), pp. 588–589.
  - Heinzelmann, Ursula. "Torte". In Goldstein (2015), pp. 739–740.
- Grigson, Jane (1983). The Observer Guide to European Cookery. Michael Joseph. ISBN 978-0-7181-2233-1.
- Gürtler, Alexandra; Wagner, Christoph (2005). Das neue Sacher-Kochbuch die zeitgemässe österreichische Küche [The New Sacher Cookbook: Contemporary Austrian Cuisine] (in German). Pichler Verlag. ISBN 978-3-85431-350-2.
- Haber, Barbara (2003) [2002]. From Hardtack to Homefries: An Uncommon History of American Cooks and Meals. Penguin Books. ISBN 978-0-684-84217-2.
- Haslinger, Ingrid [in German] (2018). Die Wiener Küche. Kulturgeschichte und Rezepte [Viennese Cuisine: Cultural History and Recipes] (in German). Mandelbaum. ISBN 978-3-85476-558-5.
- Humble, Nicola (2010). Cake: A Global History. Reaktion Books. ISBN 978-1-86189-648-3.
- Iaia, Sarah Kelly (1988) [1985]. Festive Baking: Holiday Classics in the Swiss, German, and Austrian Traditions. Doubleday. ISBN 978-0-385-19731-1.
- "Konditorwaren" [Confectionery]. Österreichisches Lebensmittelbuch [Austrian Food Codex] (in German) (4th ed.). 23 January 2013. 2. Spezieller Teil / 2.1 Sacher.
- Krondl, Michael (2011). Sweet Invention: A History of Dessert. Chicago Review Press. ISBN 978-1-55652-954-2.
- Maier-Bruck, Franz [in German] (1975). Das große Sacher Kochbuch: Die österreichische Küche [The Great Sacher Cookbook: Austrian Cuisine] (in German). Schuler Verlag. ISBN 978-3-88199-388-3.
- Maier-Bruck, Franz [in German] (2003). Klassische österreichische Küche [Classic Austrian Cuisine] (in German). Seehamer. ISBN 978-3-932131-98-1.
- Mason, Laura (2006). "Sachertorte". In Jaine, Tom; Davidson, Jane; Saberi, Helen (eds.). The Oxford Companion to Food (2nd ed.). Oxford University Press. ISBN 978-0-19-280681-9.
- Rodgers, Rick (2002). Kaffeehaus: Exquisite Desserts from the Classic Cafes of Vienna, Budapest, and Prague (1st ed.). Clarkson Potter. ISBN 978-0-609-60453-3.
- "Sachertorte". Oxford English Dictionary (online ed.). Oxford University Press. doi:10.1093/OED/6181829176. (Subscription or participating institution membership required.)
- Segnit, Niki (2010). The Flavour Thesaurus: Pairings, Recipes and Ideas For the Creative Cook. Bloomsbury Publishing. ISBN 978-0-7475-9977-7.
- Stolzer, Dominik; Klein, Michael; Fertl, Krista (2016). Das Original Sacher-Backbuch [The Original Sacher Baking Book] (in German). Gräfe und Unzer. ISBN 978-3-8338-5854-3.
- Weaver, William Woys (2003). "Germany, Austria, Switzerland". In Katz, Solomon H (ed.). Encyclopedia of Food and Culture. Scribner Library of Daily Life. Vol. 2. Charles Scribner's Sons. ISBN 978-0-684-80566-5.
- Wohlmuth, Edward G (2017). "Recipes". In Beckett, Stephen T.; Fowler, Mark S.; Ziegler, Gregory R. (eds.). Beckett's Industrial Chocolate Manufacture and Use (5th ed.). Wiley. ISBN 978-1-118-78014-5.
