= Anna Sacher =

Austrian hotel owner and proprietor

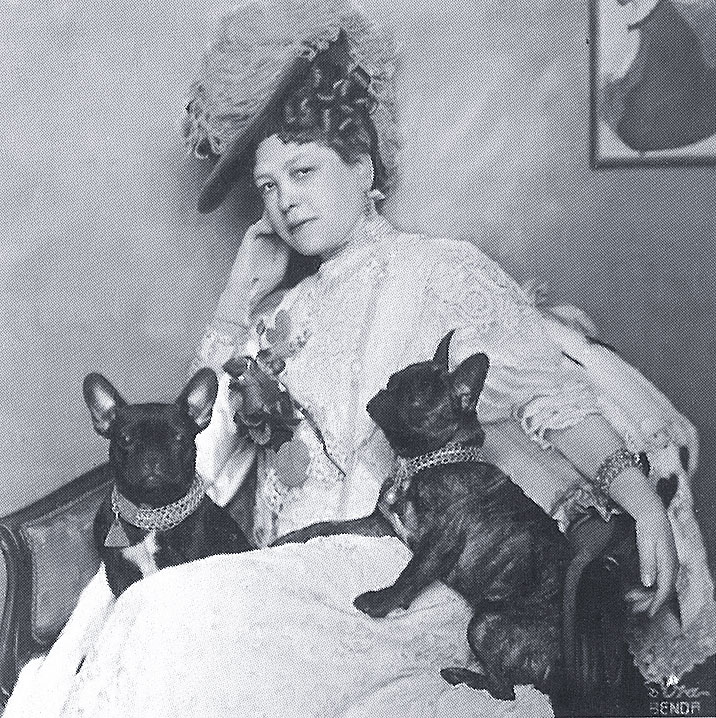
- Anna Sacher with her famous bull dogs around 1908
- Born: Anna Maria Fuchs; 2 January 1859; Vienna, Austria
- Died: 25 February 1930 (aged 71); Vienna, Austria
- Occupation: Hotel proprietor
- Spouse: Eduard Sacher (m. 1880)
- Father: Johann Fuchs
- Relatives: Franz Sacher (Father in Law)

Anna Sacher (née Fuchs; 2 January 1859 — 25 February 1930) was an Austrian hotel owner and proprietor, who was the owner of the world famous Hotel Sacher. She was the daughter-in-law of Franz Sacher.

== Life ==
Anna was born on 2 January 1859 in Vienna, Austria. Her father Johann Fuchs was a butcher. Anna grew up in Leopoldstadt, the 2nd district of the Austrian capital, where she attended school and used to help her father in his butcher's shop.

In 1880, she married the restaurateur and hotelier Eduard Sacher (1843-1892), the son of Rosa and Franz Sacher, inventors of the later world-famous Sachertorte, which was later made in the Hotel Sacher confectionery. Anna had three children with her husband: Eduard Junior, Franziska, and Anna ("Anni"). In 1876, Eduard Sacher opened his hotel on the Vienna Philharmonic Street. Within a few years, it was valued for its elegance, exclusivity, and top gastronomy. After her husband died in 1892, Anna took over the management of the house and the hotel. In the following decades, she made the Hotel Sacher one of the most famous hotels in Europe with her gastronomic knowledge and her unique corporate style.

Anna Sacher received numerous awards at culinary art exhibitions as a hotel manager. Her fondness for cigars and for small French Bulldogs (so-called "Sacher-Bullys"), which she also bred herself under her kennel name "Dernier cri". In 1929 Anna Sacher retired from hotel management.

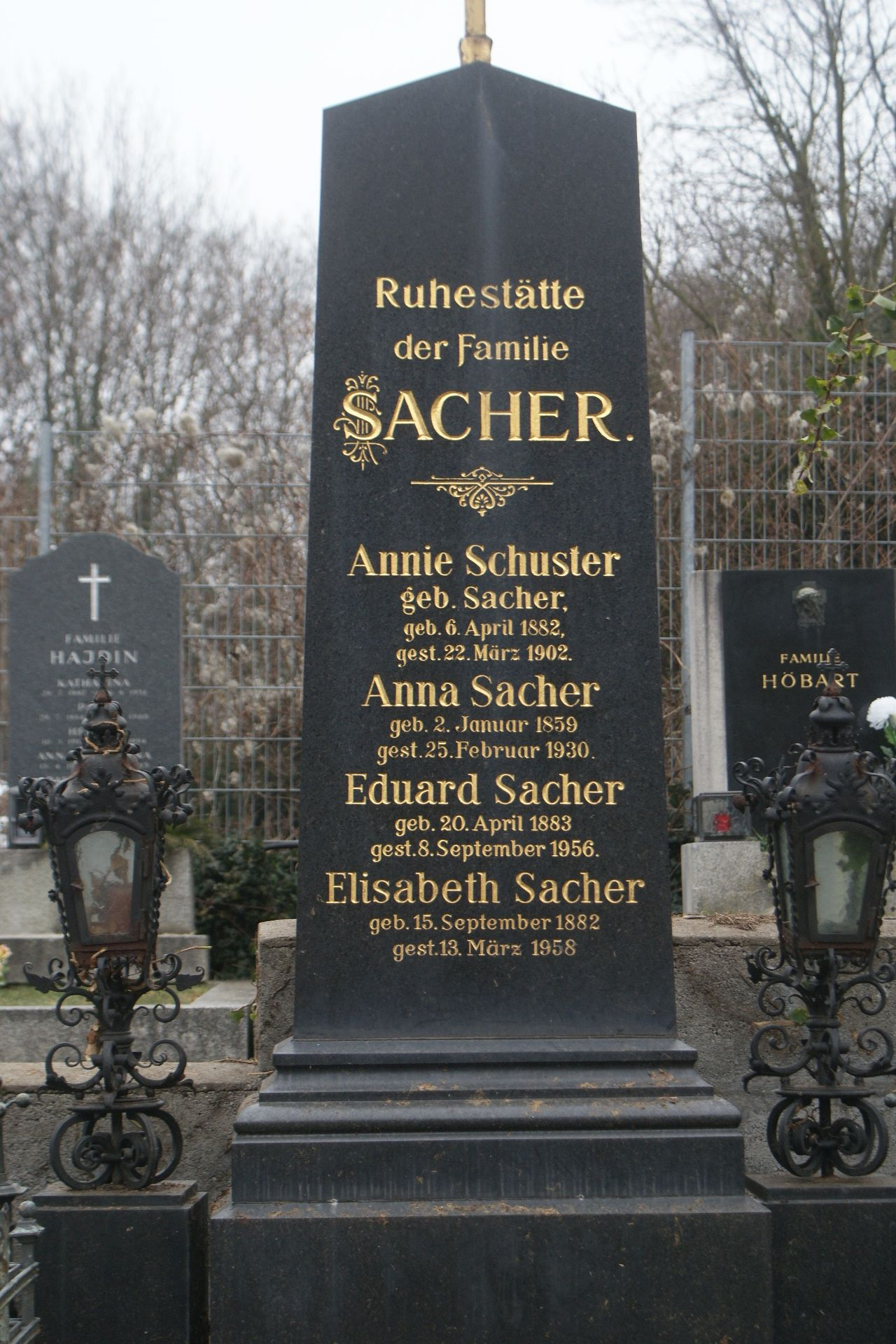
Gravesite of Anna Sacher and her son Eduard Sacher Jr. (1883–1956)

Anna Sacher died in Vienna on 25 February 1930. She was buried in the Dornbacher Friedhof (Dornbach Cemetery) in Vienna.

== Awards ==
- Gold Medal for Services to the Republic of Austria

== In popular culture ==
=== Film ===
- Hotel Sacher, Anna Sacher's character played by Hedwig Bleibtreu (Feature film, 1939).
- Das Sacher by Robert Dornhelm (2016).
- The Queen of Vienna - Anna Sacher and her Hotel by Beate Thalberg (Documentary film, 2016).

=== Literature ===
- W. Filek-Wittinghausen: "Sacher Anna". In: Österreichisches Biographisches Lexikon 1815–1950 (ÖBL). Vol. 9, Austrian Academy of Sciences, Vienna 1988, ISBN 3-7001-1483-4, p. 366.
- Ingrid Haslinger: Kunde – Kaiser. Die Geschichte der ehemaligen k. u. k. Hoflieferanten. Schroll, Wien 1996, ISBN 3-85202-129-4.
- János Kalmár, Mella Waldstein: K.u.K. Hoflieferanten Wiens. Stocker, Graz 2001, ISBN 3-7020-0935-3. S. 10–15.
- Charlotte Natmeßnig (2005). "Sacher, Anna". Neue Deutsche Biographie (in German). Vol. 22. Berlin: Duncker & Humblot. pp. 323–324. (full text online).
- Monika Czernin: Das letzte Fest des alten Europa: Anna Sacher und ihr Hotel. Knaus, München 2014, ISBN 978-3-8135-0434-7
