= Demel =

Austrian confectioner and café established in 1786

Coordinates: 48°12′31″N 16°22′02″E

K.u.K. Hofzuckerbäcker Ch. Demel's Söhne GmbH
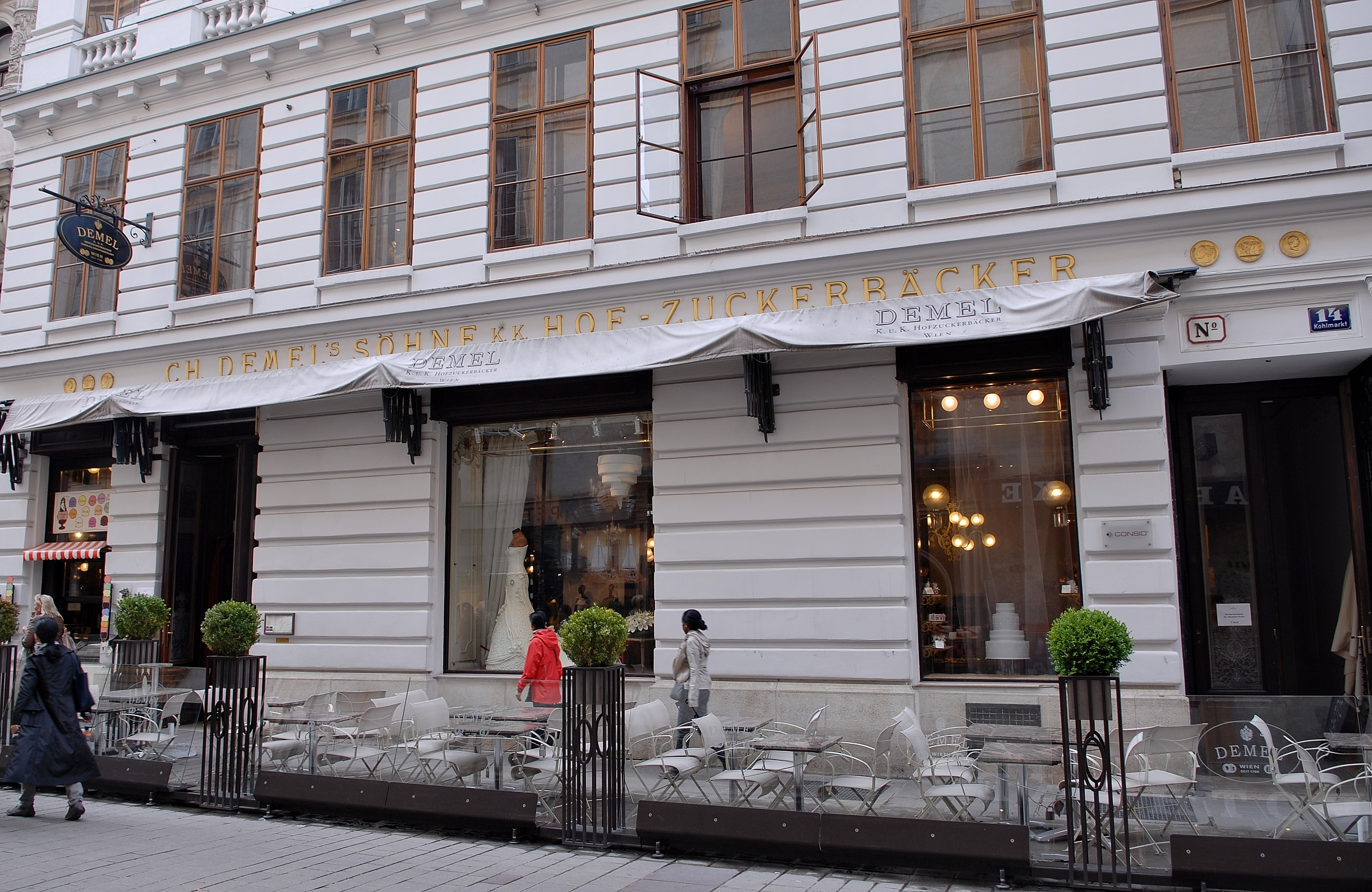
- Front of Demel's location in Vienna
- Trade name: Demel
- Company type: GmbH
- Industry: Confectionery
- Founded: 1786; 240 years ago
- Headquarters: Kohlmarkt 14; Vienna, Austria
- Products: Pastries; candy
- Services: Konditorei
- Parent: Do & Co
- Website: demel.com

Demel is an Austrian confectioner and Konditorei that was established in 1786 in Vienna, Austria. The company was granted the status of a Purveyor to the Imperial and Royal Court (K.u.K. Hoflieferant), specifically as K.u.K. Hofzuckerbäcker.

== Location ==
Demel is located in the central Innere Stadt district of Vienna at Kohlmarkt 14, near the Hofburg palace. The interior was designed by Portois and Fix decorators in a Neo-baroque style.

The white-aproned waitresses (known as Demelinerinnen in German) usually address the customers in a traditional honorific third person style, "Haben schon gewählt?" or "Wollen etwas zu sich nehmen, wenn belieben?". The cabaret artist Helmut Qualtinger extolled their timeless quality in his song Die Demelinerinnen.

The company formerly had a small café at The Plaza hotel's Retail Collection in New York City, but that location was closed by March 2010. In addition, Demel temporarily had a location in Salzburg, which was closed in March 2012.

== History ==
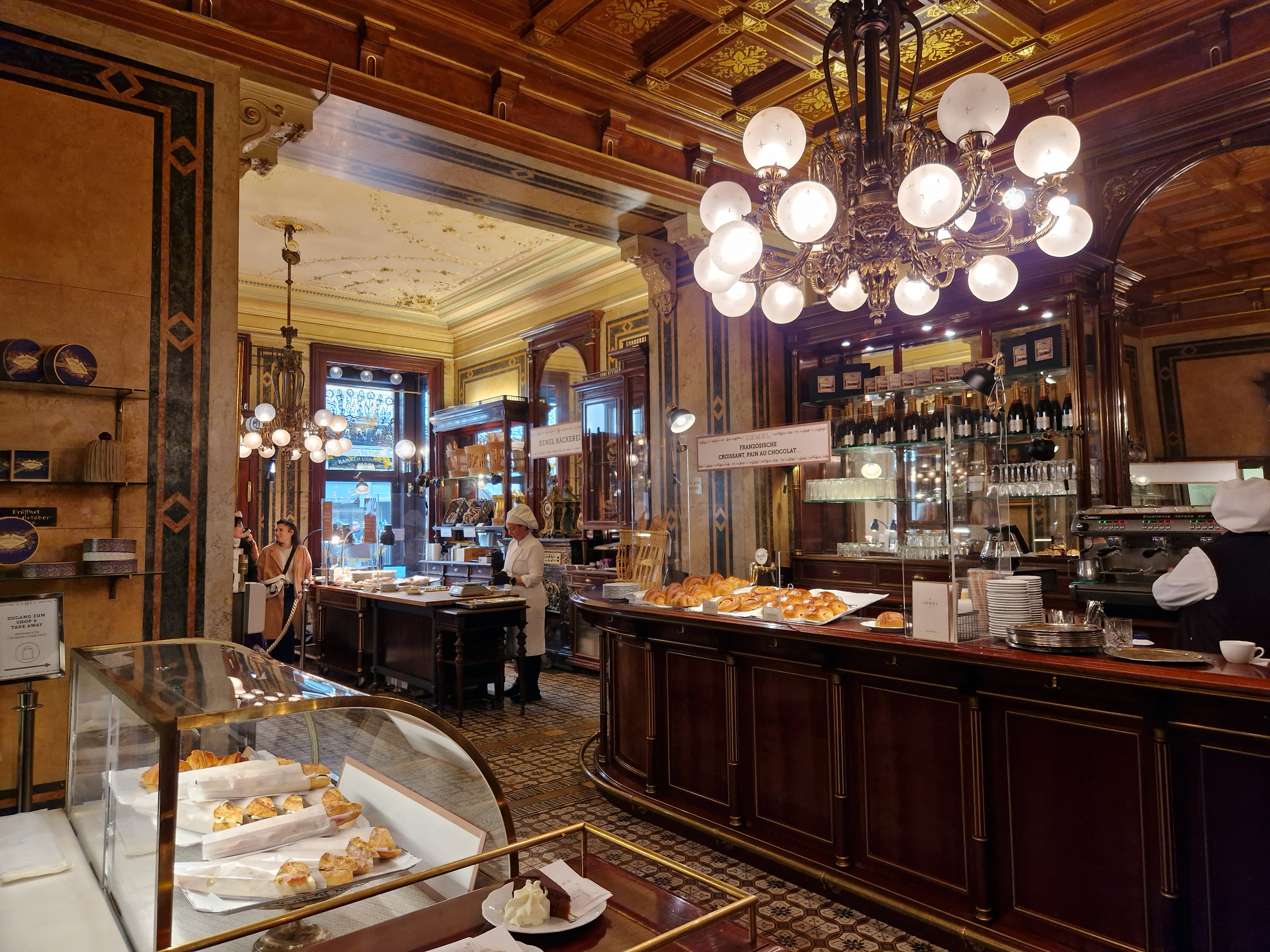
Interior of Demel in Vienna

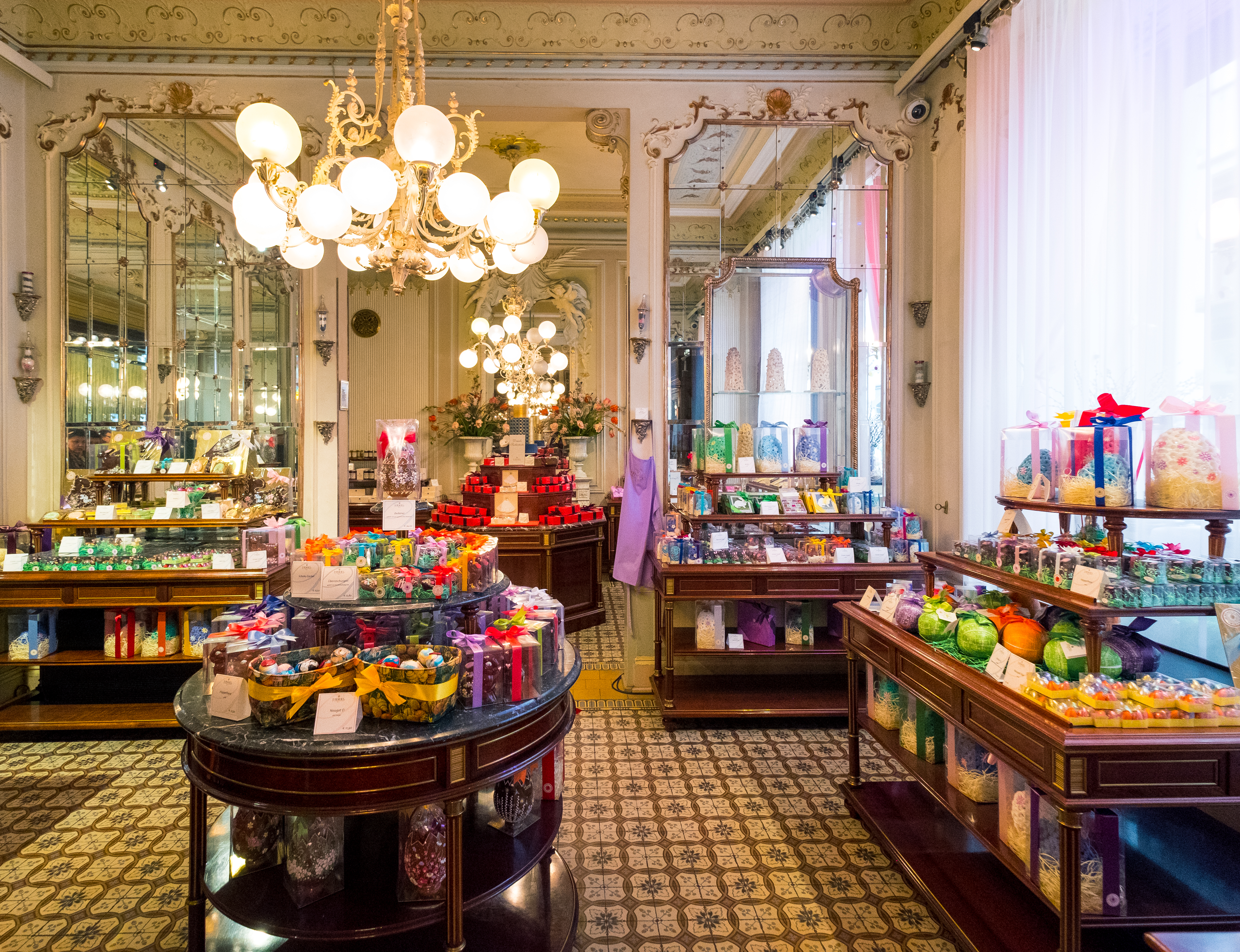
Confectionery items on display

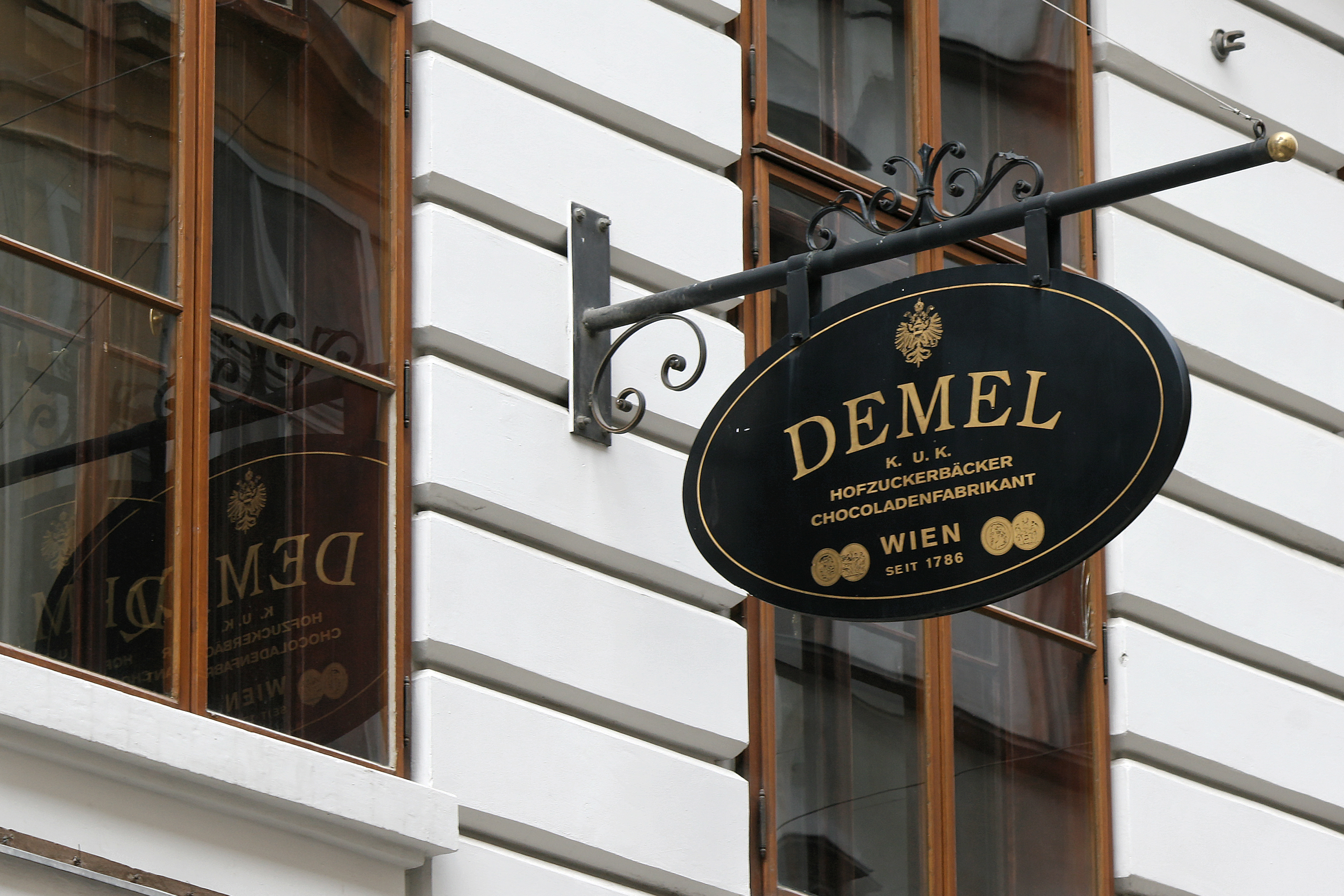
Demel's exterior sign

The business was founded on Michaelerplatz by Ludwig Dehne, a confectioner from Württemberg. Upon his early death in 1799, the pastry shop was continued by his widow for their minor son August Dehne. In 1813, she purchased a building at Michaelerplatz 14. August Dehne inherited the company in 1832 and successfully managed the business. However, when his son pursued an academic career, he sold the company in 1857 to his journeyman Christoph Demel.

In 1867, it was renamed as Ch. Demel's Söhne after Christoph Demel's sons Joseph and Karl took over the business. It was granted the status of an official purveyor to the Habsburg court in 1874 by Emperor Franz Joseph I of Austria. When the old Burgtheater on Michaelerplatz was demolished in 1888, combined with a general refurbishment of the whole square, they moved the confectionery around the corner to Kohlmarkt, where the company is still located today in its original building.

During the heyday of the Austro-Hungarian monarchy, notable customers included Empress Elisabeth (Sisi), Princess Pauline von Metternich, and actress Katharina Schratt. During the Austrian Anschluss to Nazi Germany 1938–45, the Vienna Gauleiter Baldur von Schirach and his wife Henriette were regulars at Demel.

The company was headed by Christoph Demel's descendants until 1972, when the entrepreneur Udo Proksch bought it and established the Club 45 on the first floor, a popular venue for Vienna's high society. After Proksch was arrested for his involvement in the Lucona affair in 1989, the Raiffeisen Bank became the owner of the business. In 2002, the Do & Co restaurants and catering company took over Demel.

== Sacher Torte ==
In the early decades of the twentieth century, a legal battle over the use of the label "The Original Sacher Torte" developed between the Hotel Sacher and the Demel bakery. Eduard Sacher, son of Franz Sacher, the inventor of Sacher Torte, had completed his own recipe of his father's cake during his time at Demel, which was the first establishment to offer the "Original" cake. Following the death of Eduard's widow Anna in 1930 and the bankruptcy of the Hotel Sacher in 1934, Eduard Sacher's son (also named Eduard Sacher) found employment at Demel and brought to the bakery the sole distribution rights for an Eduard-Sacher-Torte.

The first differences of opinion arose in 1938, when the new owners of the Hotel Sacher began to sell Sacher Tortes from vendor carts under the trademarked name "The Original Sacher Torte". After interruptions brought about by the Second World War and the ensuing Allied occupation, the hotel's owners sued Demel in 1954, with the hotel asserting its trademark rights and the bakery claiming it developed and bought the title "Original Sacher Torte".

During the next seven years, both parties waged an intense legal battle over several of the dessert's specific characteristics, including the change of the name, the second layer of jam in the middle of the cake, and the substitution of margarine for butter in the baking of the cake. The author Friedrich Torberg, who was a frequent guest at both establishments, served as a witness during this process and testified that – during the lifetime of Anna Sacher – the cake was never covered with marmalade nor cut through the middle. In 1963, both parties agreed on an out of court settlement that gave the Hotel Sacher the rights to the phrase "The Original Sachertorte" and gave Demel the rights to decorate its tortes with a triangular seal that reads Eduard-Sacher-Torte.

== Demel Museum ==
The Vienna site features a museum with artifacts about the history of the Imperial chocolate-making bakery.

== See also ==
- Viennese coffee house culture
- List of restaurants in Vienna
- Chocolaterie
- Pâtisserie
- Viennoiserie
