= Codex Alimentarius =

Collection of internationally recognized food standards

The Codex Alimentarius (Latin for 'Food Code') is a collection of internationally recognized standards, codes of practice, guidelines, and other recommendations published by the Food and Agriculture Organization (FAO) and World Health Organization (WHO) of the United Nations relating to food, food production, food labeling, and food safety.

== History and governance ==
Its name is derived from the Codex Alimentarius Austriacus. Its texts are developed and maintained by the Codex Alimentarius Commission (CAC), a body established in early November 1961 by the Food and Agriculture Organization of the United Nations (FAO). Joined by the World Health Organization (WHO) in June 1962, the CAC held its first session in Rome in October 1963.

The Commission's main goals are to protect the health of consumers, to facilitate international trade, and to ensure fair practices in the international food trade.

The CAC is an intergovernmental organization: the member states of the FAO and WHO send delegations to the CAC. As of 2021, there were 189 members of the CAC (188 member countries plus one member organization, the European Union) and 239 Codex observers (59 intergovernmental organizations, 164 non-governmental organizations, and 16 United Nations organizations).

The CAC develops food standards on scientific evidence furnished by the scientific committees of the FAO and WHO; the oldest of these, the Joint FAO/WHO Expert Committee on Food Additives (JECFA), was established in 1956 and predates the establishment of the CAC itself. According to a 2013 study, the CAC's primary functions are "establishing international food standards for approved food additives, providing maximum levels in foods; maximum limits for contaminants and toxins; maximum residue limits for pesticides and for veterinary drugs used in veterinary animals; and establishing hygiene and technological function practice codes".

The CAC does not have regulatory authority, and the Codex Alimentarius is a reference guide, not an enforceable standard on its own. However, several nations adopt the Codex Alimentarius in their own regulations, and the World Trade Organization (WTO), for purposes of food safety, refers to the Codex Alimentarius Sanitary and Phytosanitary practice codes in the Agreement on the Application of Sanitary and Phytosanitary Measures (SPS Agreement) for member countries. The Codex Alimentarius is thus an international reference point for the resolution of international trade disputes concerning food safety and consumer protection. Many bilateral and multilateral trade agreements refer to the Codex Alimentarius, adopting it as a point of reference.

== Scope ==
The Codex Alimentarius covers all foods, whether processed, semi-processed or raw. In addition to standards for specific foods, the Codex Alimentarius contains general standards covering matters such as food labeling, food hygiene, food additives and pesticide residues, and procedures for assessing the safety of foods derived from modern biotechnology. It also contains guidelines for the management of official i.e. governmental import and export inspection and certification systems for foods.

The Codex Alimentarius is published in the six official languages of the United Nations: Arabic, Chinese, English, French, Spanish and Russian. Not all texts are available in all languages.

As of 2017, the CAC had a total of 78 guidelines, 221 commodity standards, 53 codes of practice, and 106 maximum levels for contaminants of food (of which 18 covered contaminants).

In a 2018 publication, the CAC stated that: "Codex has at times been criticized as slow to complete its work, but developing food standards and compiling them as a code that is credible and authoritative requires extensive consultation. It also takes time for information to be collected and evaluated, for follow-up and verification and, at times, for consensus to be found satisfying differing views. Overall, it takes an average of 4.2 years to develop a Codex standard – and significantly less for pesticide MRLs or food additive levels."

=== General texts ===
- Food labelling (general standard, guidelines on nutrition labelling, guidelines on labelling claims)
- Food additives (general standard including authorized uses, specifications for food grade chemicals)
- Contaminants in foods (general standard, tolerances for specific contaminants including radionuclides, aflatoxins and other mycotoxins)
- Pesticide and veterinary chemical residues in foods (maximum residue limits)
- Risk assessment procedures for determining the safety of foods derived from biotechnology (DNA-modified plants, DNA-modified micro-organisms, allergens)
- Food hygiene (general principles, codes of hygienic practice in specific industries or food handling establishments, guidelines for the use of the Hazard Analysis and Critical Control Point or "HACCP" system)
- Methods of analysis and sampling

=== Specific standards ===
- Meat products (fresh, frozen, processed meats and poultry)
- Fish and fishery products (marine, fresh water and aquaculture)
- Milk and milk products
- Foods for special dietary uses (including infant formula and baby foods)
- Fresh and processed vegetables, fruits, and fruit juices
- Cereals and derived products, dried legumes
- Fats, oils and derived products such as margarine
- Miscellaneous food products (chocolate, sugar, honey, mineral water)

== Classification of supplements and additives ==
In 1996 the German delegation, sponsored by three German pharmaceutical firms, put forward a proposal that no herb, vitamin or mineral should be sold for preventive or therapeutic reasons, and that supplements should be reclassified as drugs. The proposal was agreed, but protests halted its implementation. The 28th Session of the Codex Alimentarius Commission was subsequently held July 4–9, 2005. Among the many issues discussed were the Guidelines for Vitamin and Mineral Food Supplements, which were adopted during the meeting as new global safety guidelines: The guidelines state that "people should...be encouraged to select a balanced diet from food before considering any vitamin and mineral supplement. In cases where the intake from the diet is insufficient or where consumers consider their diet requires supplementation, vitamin and mineral food supplements serve to supplement the daily diet."

The Codex Alimentarius Commission (CAC) has said that the Guidelines call "for labelling that contains information on maximum consumption levels of vitamin and mineral food supplements". The WHO has also said that the Guidelines "ensure that consumers receive beneficial health effects from vitamins and minerals".

In 2004, similarities were noted between the EU's Food Supplements Directive and the Codex Alimentarius draft guidelines for vitamin and mineral supplements.

== Criticism ==
The 2003 International Commission of the Future of Food and Agriculture, convened by Italian politician Claudio Martini and chaired by anti-globalization activist Vandana Shiva, issued several manifestos, including the Manifesto on the Future of Food, which contended that "bureaucracies like the World Trade Organization, the World Bank, the International Monetary Fund, and the Codex Alimentarius have codified policies designed to serve the interests of global agribusiness above all others, while actively undermining the rights of farmers and consumers".

== Conspiracy theories ==
The Codex Alimentarius has been the subject of various conspiracy theories. These theorize that it is an agenda for population control, an anti-alternative medicine Big Brother initiative, or a process for a World Government to establish eugenics.

== See also ==
- FDA Food Safety Modernization Act
- Food Chemicals Codex
- Food additive (INS and E numbers)
