= Torte =

Rich, usually multilayered, cake

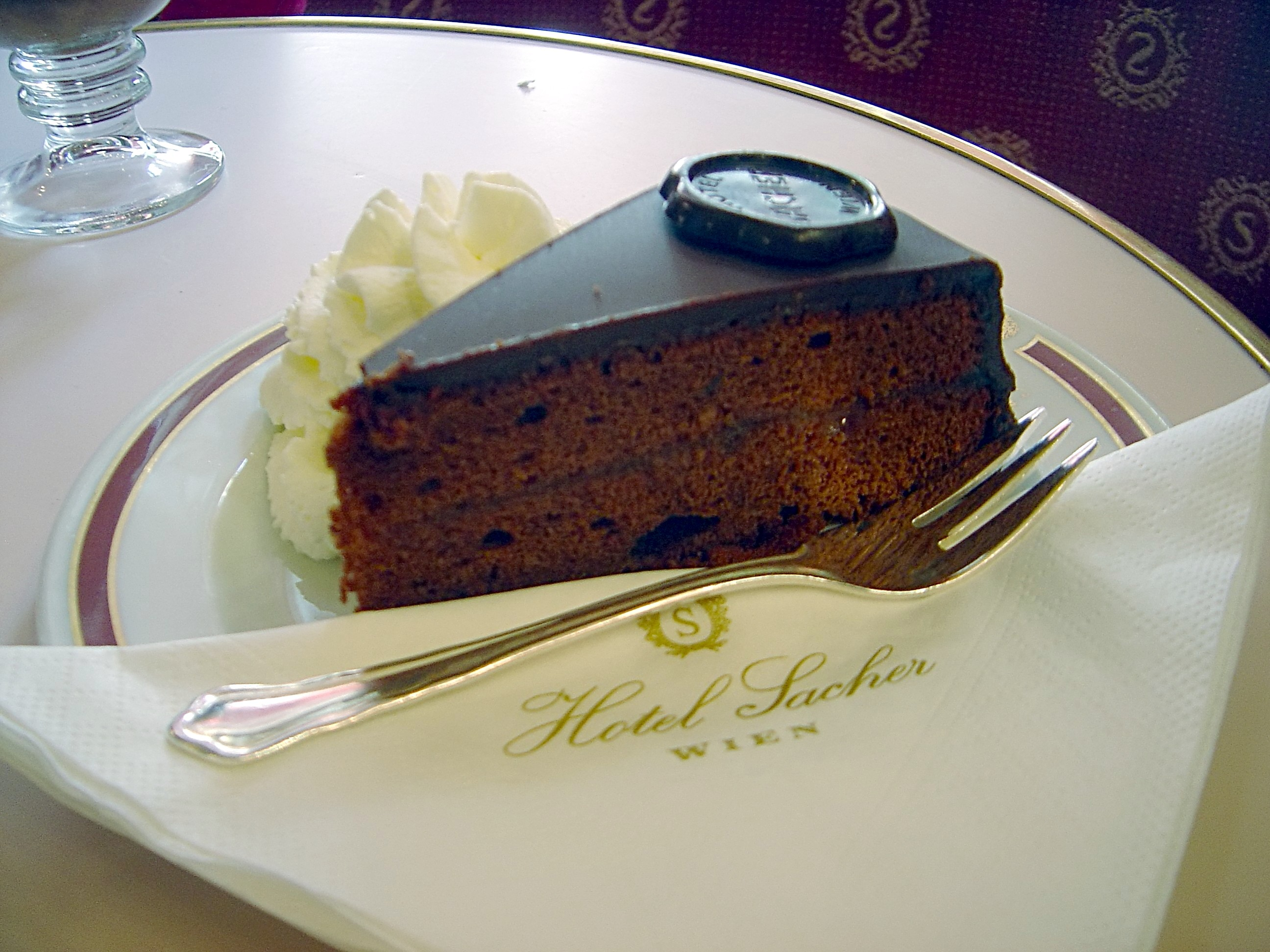
- A serving of Sachertorte at the Hotel Sacher, Vienna
- Type: Cake
- Main ingredients: Cake base Filling: buttercream, mousse, jam, or fruits

A torte (/ˈtɔːrt/; from German: Torte (German pronunciation: [ˈtɔʁtə]), in turn from Latin via Italian: torta) is a rich, usually multilayered, cake that is filled with whipped cream, buttercreams, mousses, jams, or fruit.

Tortes are commonly baked in a springform pan. Sponge cake is a common base, but a torte's cake layers may instead be made with little to no flour, using ingredients such as ground nuts or breadcrumbs. Ordinarily, the cooled torte is glazed and garnished.

== Well-known European tortes ==
- Dobos torte
- Sachertorte
- Esterházy torte
- Kyiv torte
- Linzer torte
- Swiss roll
- Napoleon torte
- Gâteau Pithiviers
- Princess cake
- Prinzregententorte
- Runeberg torte
- Tarta de Santiago
- Black Forest Gateau
- Smörgåstårta
- St. Honoré cake

== See also ==
- Torta
