= Linzertorte =

Austrian pastry

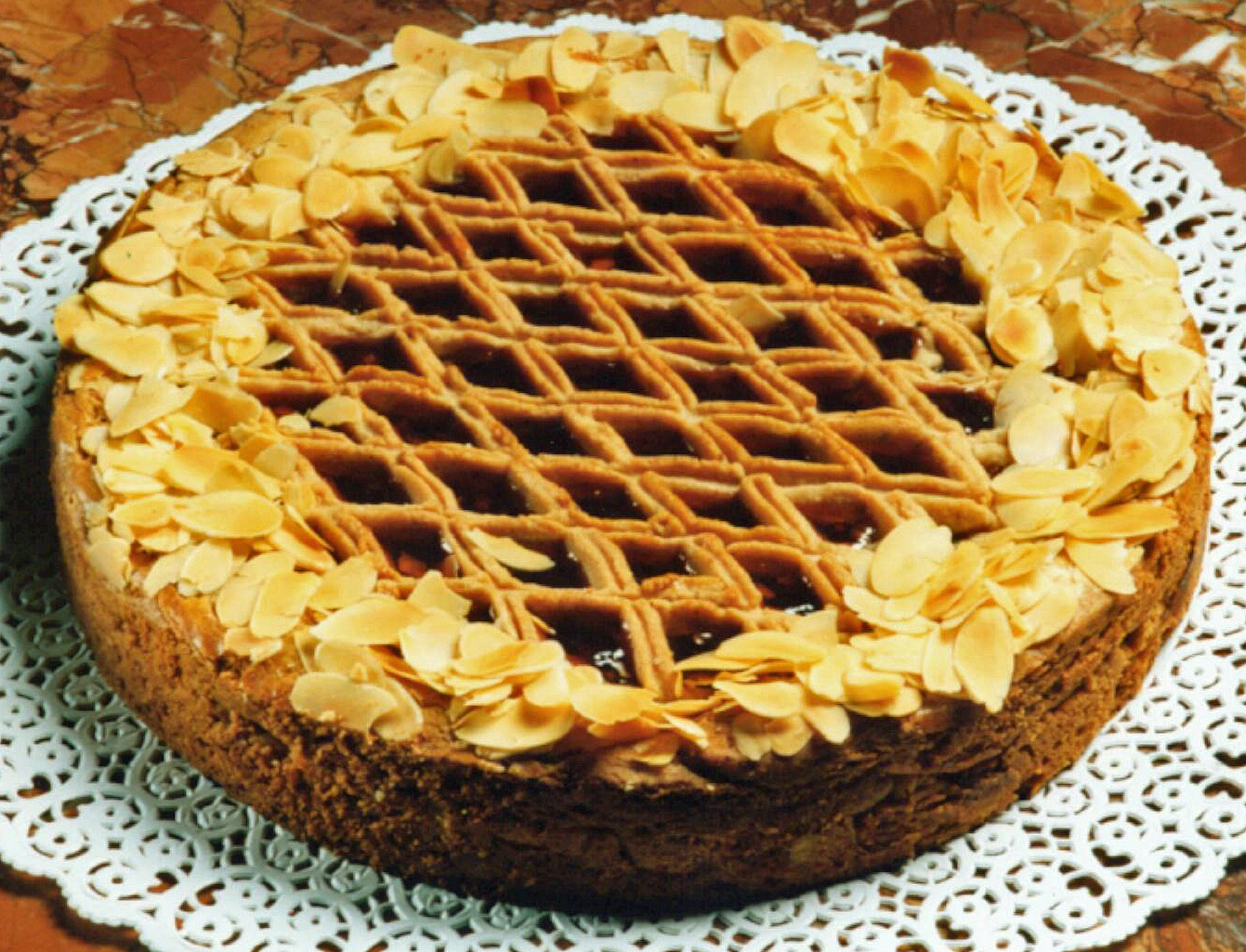
- Alternative names: Linzer torte, Linzer cookie, Linzer tart
- Type: Cake
- Place of origin: Austria
- Region or state: Linz
- Main ingredients: Flour, unsalted butter, egg yolks, lemon zest, cinnamon, lemon juice, ground nuts (usually hazelnuts, or walnuts or almonds), redcurrant jam

The Linzertorte is a traditional Austrian pastry, a form of shortcrust topped with fruit preserves and sliced nuts with a lattice design on top. It is named after the city of Linz, Austria.

Linzertorte is a very short, crumbly pastry made of flour, unsalted butter, egg yolks, lemon zest, cinnamon and lemon juice, and ground nuts, usually hazelnuts, but even walnuts or almonds are used, covered with a filling of redcurrant, raspberry, or apricot preserves. Unlike most tortes, it is typically single layered like a pie or tart. It is covered by a lattice of thin dough strips placed atop the fruit. The pastry is brushed with lightly beaten egg whites, baked, and garnished with nuts.

Linzertorte is a holiday treat in the Austrian, Czech, Swiss, German, and Tirolean traditions, often eaten at Christmas. Some North American bakeries offer Linzertorte as small tarts or as cookies.

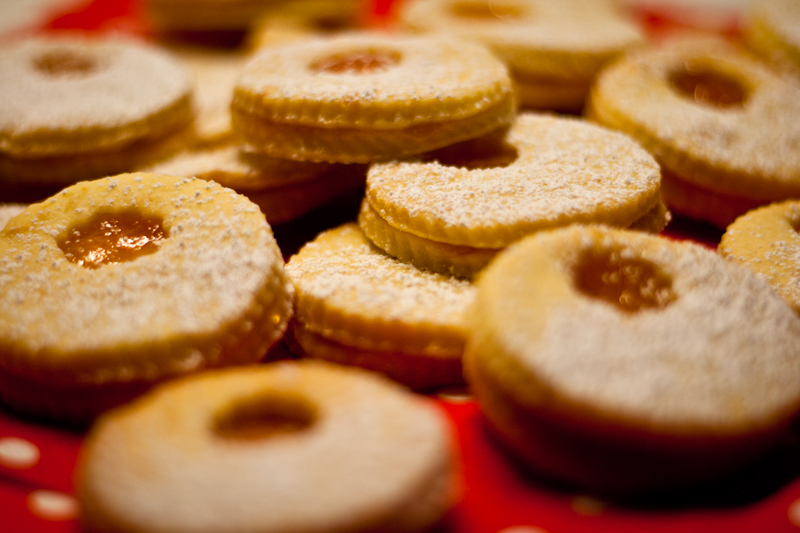
Linzer cookies

Linzer cookies (German: Linzer Augen, "Linzer eyes") or Linzer tarts are a sandwich cookie version, topped with a layer of dough with a characteristic circle shaped cut-out exposing the fruit preserves, and dusted with confectioner's sugar.

== History ==
The Linzertorte has been cited as the oldest cake ever to be named after a place. For a long time, the recipe from 1696 in the Wiener Stadt- und Landesbibliothek was the oldest one known. In 2005, however, Waltraud Faißner, the library director of the Upper Austrian Landesmuseum and author of the book Wie mann die Linzer Dortten macht ("How to make the Linzertorte"), found an even older Veronese recipe from 1653 in Codex 35/31 in the archive of Admont Abbey.

The invention of the Linzertorte is subject of numerous legends, claiming either a Viennese confectioner named Linzer (as given by Alfred Polgar) or the Franconian pastry chef Johann Konrad Vogel (1796–1883), who started mass production of the cake in Linz around 1823.

The Austrian migrant Franz Hölzlhuber claimed to have introduced the Linzertorte to Milwaukee in the 1850s.

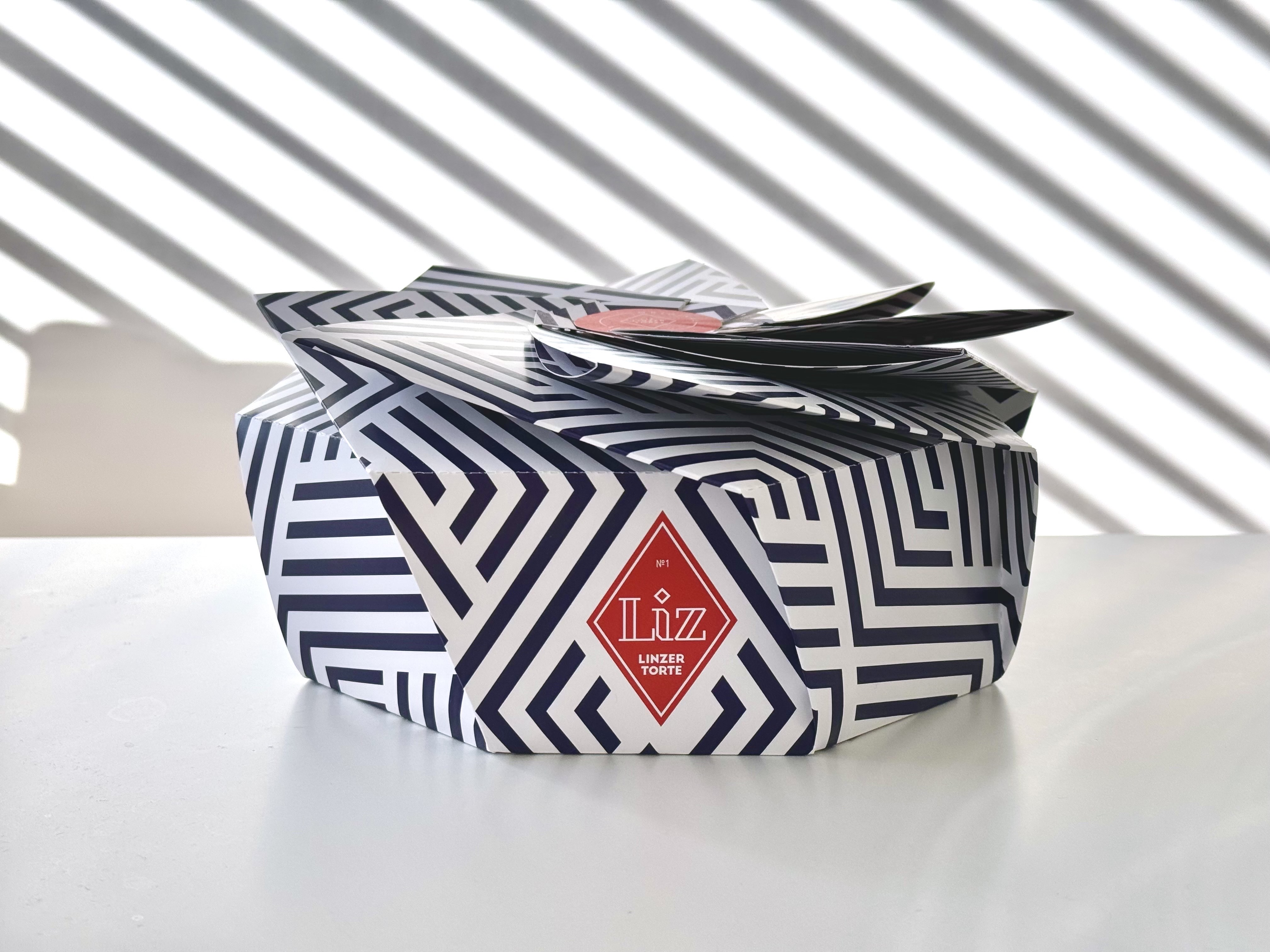
Linzertorte in characteristic packaging

== See also ==
- Empire biscuit
- Vlaai
