= Esterházy torte =

Type of layer cake

Esterházy torta
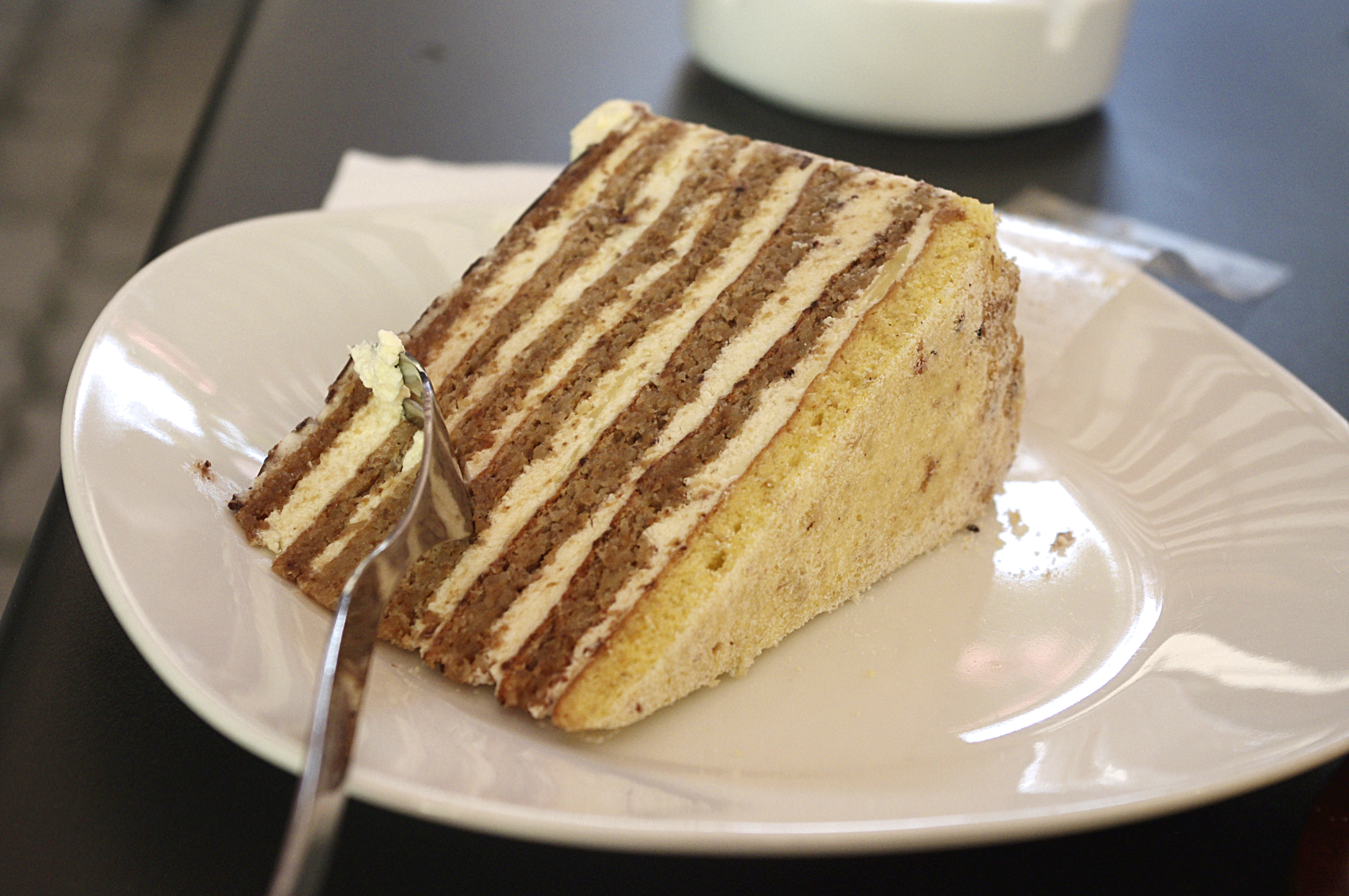
- Esterházy torta slice, served at a confectionery in Sopron
- Type: Cake
- Place of origin: Hungary
- Main ingredients: Almond meringue, buttercream

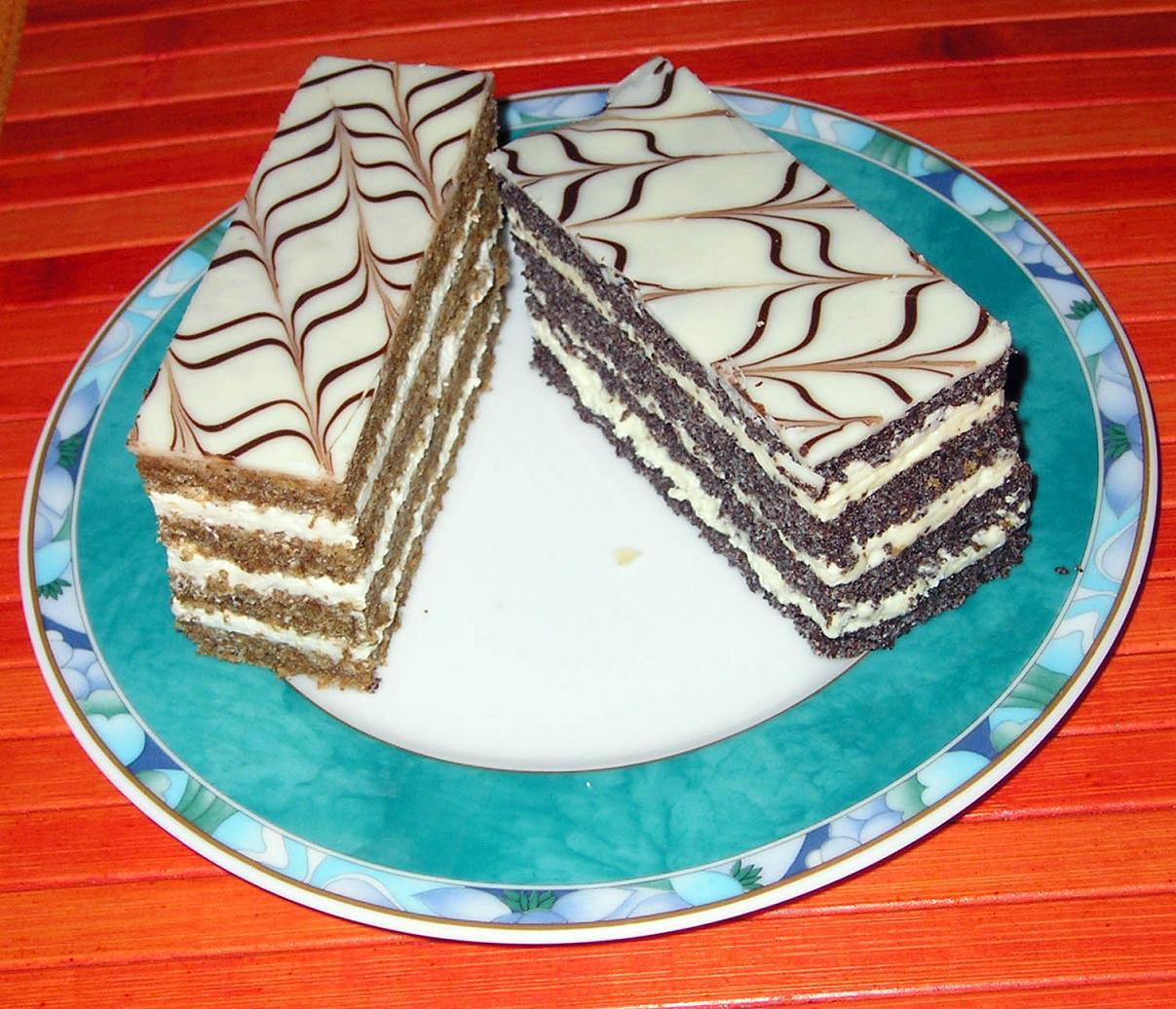
Two Esterházy Schnitten

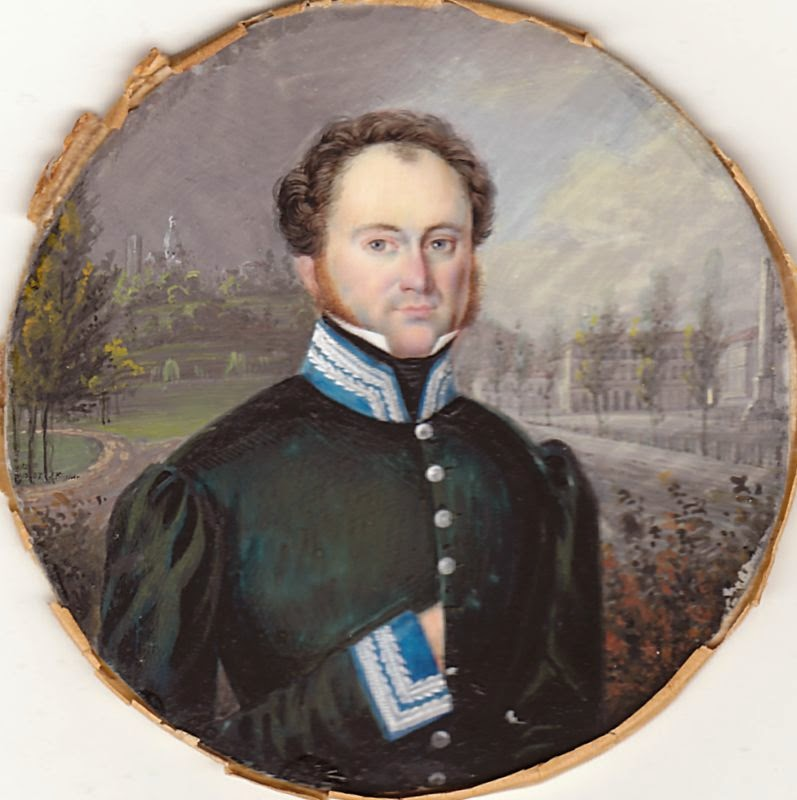
Prince Paul III Anton Esterházy de Galántha (1786–1866)

Esterházy torta is a Hungarian cake (torte) named after Prince Paul III Anton Esterházy de Galántha (1786–1866), a member of the Esterházy dynasty and diplomat of the Austrian Empire. It was invented by Budapest confectioners in the late 19th century and soon became one of the most famous cakes in the lands of the Austro-Hungarian Monarchy.

Esterházy torta consists of buttercream spiced with cognac or vanilla, sandwiched between four and five layers of almond meringue (macaron) dough. The torte is iced with a fondant glaze and decorated with a characteristic chocolate striped pattern. There are, however, many different recipe variations. In Hungary, the original almonds have been entirely replaced by walnuts.

== Esterházy Schnitten ==
A popular variant, although not in Hungary, are Esterházy Schnitten: while a Torta is always of round shape, Schnitten are made in a square shape. Other versions based on sponge cake or decorated with crystallized fruit also exist. Esterházy Schnitten is typically a very sweet cake.

== See also ==
- Dobos torte
- List of almond dishes
- List of cakes
