= Codex Alimentarius Austriacus =

The Codex Alimentarius Austriacus is a collection of standards, guidelines and product descriptions for a variety of foods. It was originally established by the Austrian-Hungarian Empire in 1891 and is still in use today. The Codex Alimentarius Austriacus standards are primarily the product of a voluntary effort of experts in the food industry and universities. While the standards laid out in the codex were not legally enforceable, they were nonetheless used by the courts to determine the identity and quality of a variety of food products.

== History ==
Until the mid-20th century, the Codex Alimentarius Austriacus was not well-known beyond the German-speaking countries of Europe. It subsequently lent its name to the international Codex Alimentarius Commission, the current international food codex collaboratively worked out by the Food and Agriculture Organization and the World Health Organization. Consisting of three volumes, the Codex was finished sometime between 1910 and 1917 by O. Dafert. It lacked actual integration into Austrian law until 1975. The idea of a Europe-wide Codex Alimentarius based on the Austrian model was actively pursued by Hans Frenzel of Austria between 1954 and 1958. Frenzel's work culminated in the creation of the Council of the Codex Alimentarius Europaeus in June 1958, under the joint sponsorship of the International Commission on Agricultural Industries and the International Bureau of Analytical Chemistry. In 1975, the committee for the Codex Alimentarius Austriacus was reorganized to conform with Austrian food laws, which have a reputation of being some of the strictest food laws in the world.

== See also ==
- Codex Alimentarius
