= Elisabeth Gürtler =

Austrian businesswoman (born 1950)

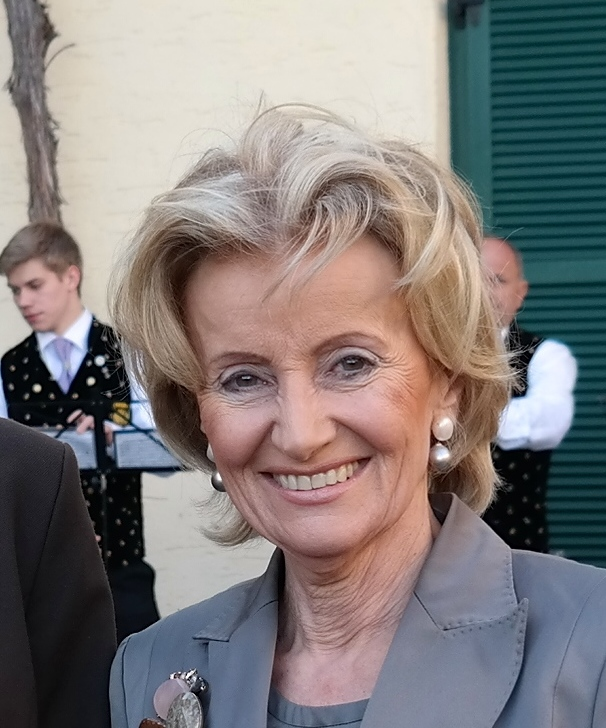
- Elisabeth Gürtler
- Other names: Elisabeth Gürtler-Mauthner
- Occupation: business executive

Elisabeth Gürtler-Mauthner (born 7 May 1950) is an Austrian businesswoman. She is managing director of the Hotel Sacher, Vienna's most famous hotel.

Born in Vienna, Gürtler attended a Catholic gymnasium in her home town, took her Matura exams in 1968 and then studied economics, graduating in 1972. In 1990, on the suicide of her ex-husband, Peter Gürtler, she took over the management of the Hotel Sacher, with 500 employees under her, as he had left the hotel to their two children, at that time still minors.

From 1995 until 2000 she was Vice-President of the Austrian Federal Economic Chamber. From 2001 until 2007 she chaired the Vienna Opera Ball. In that capacity, in 2005, she introduced a smoking ban for the first time in the history of that event.

In 2007, Gürtler became the first female director of the Spanish Riding School in Vienna.

She has two children, Georg and Alexandra. Her husband was actor Helmuth Lohner. The couple lived together for 19 years before marrying in December 2011. Helmuth Lohner died on 23 June 2015. Her daughter, Alexandra Winkler, is one of the owners of the Hotel Sacher.
