= Hotel Sacher =

Luxury hotel in Vienna, Austria

Coordinates: 48°12′14″N 16°22′10″E

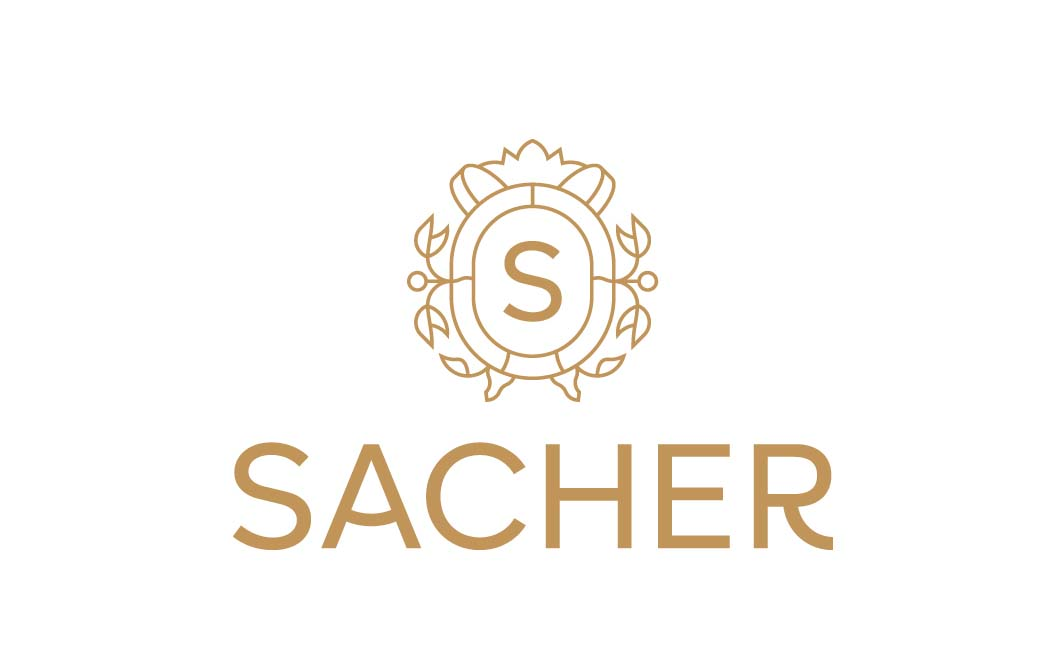

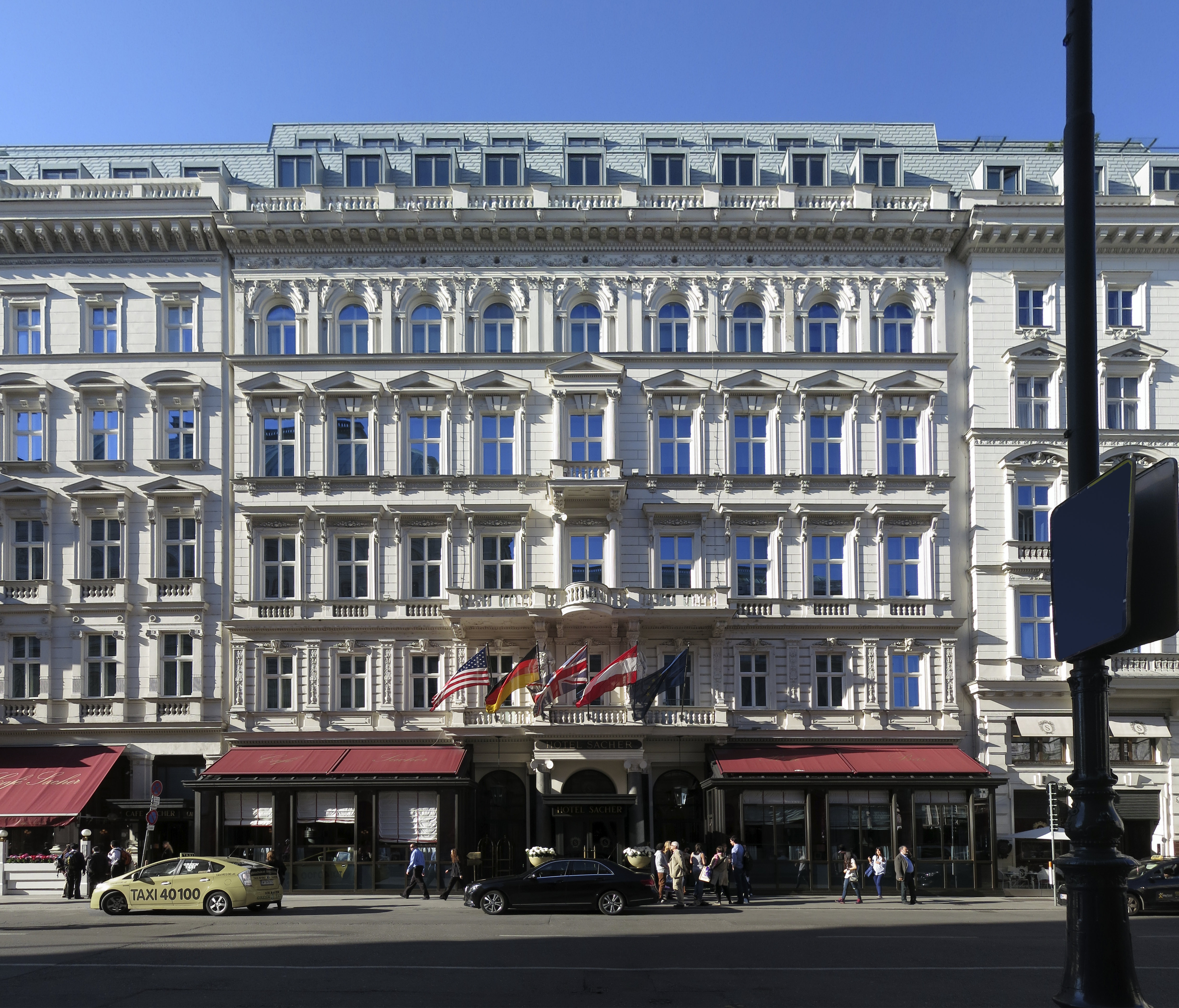

General information
- Type: Luxury hotel
- Classification: _{Superior}
- Location: Philharmonikerstraße 4, Innere Stadt, Vienna, Austria
- Opened: 1876
- Owner: Gürtler & Winkler family (since 1934)
- Operator: Sacher Hotels Betriebsgesellschaft mbH
- Affiliation: The Leading Hotels of the World

Design and construction
- Developer: Eduard Sacher

Other information
- Number of rooms: 152

Website
- sacher.com

Hotel Sacher is a five-star luxury hotel in Vienna, Austria, facing the Vienna State Opera in the city's central Innere Stadt district. It was opened in 1876 by restaurateur Eduard Sacher, son of confectioner Franz Sacher. It is famous for the specialty of the house, the Original Sachertorte, a chocolate cake with apricot filling, created by Franz Sacher in 1832 and later developed by Eduard Sacher. There is also an art gallery in the hotel, with works from the 19th century. The hotel is located near the former residence of Antonio Vivaldi.

The hotel is privately owned and is a member of The Leading Hotels of the World. It is listed in the five-star Superior category of the Austrian Hotel Classification.

== History ==
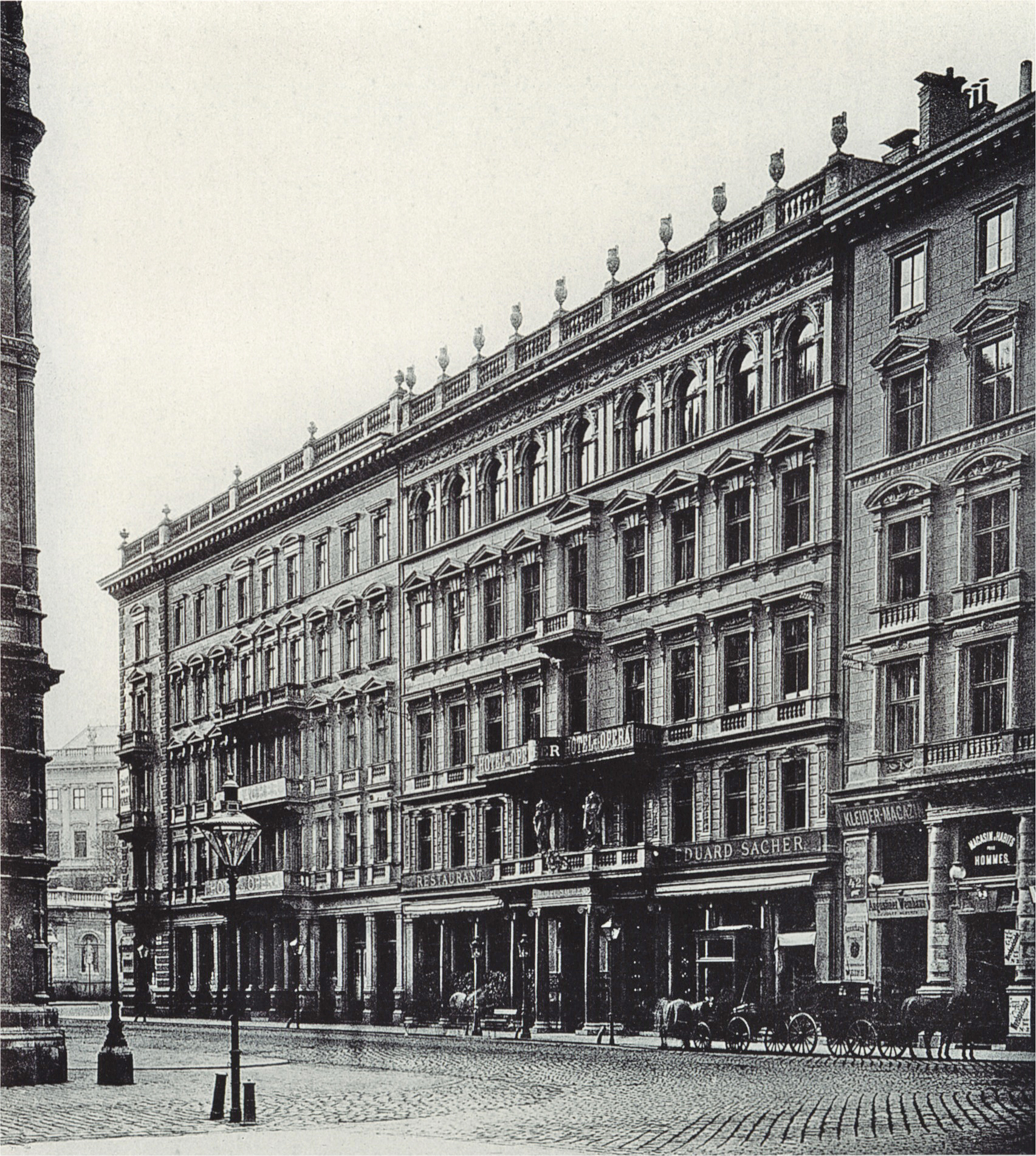
Hotel Sacher, c. 1890

The hotel was founded in 1876 as a maison meublée at the site of the demolished Theater am Kärntnertor by the restaurateur and k.u.k. purveyor to the court Eduard Sacher (1843–1892). His father, the confectioner Franz Sacher (1816–1907), had become famous for his Sachertorte, which he allegedly created for a reception given by Austrian State Chancellor Klemens von Metternich in 1832. Eduard Sacher did an apprenticeship at the patisserie Demel and in 1873 opened his first restaurant on Kärntner Straße.

In 1880, Eduard Sacher married Anna Sacher née Fuchs (1859–1930). Following his death in 1892, Anna Sacher took over management of the hotel. Anna Sacher became known for her strong personality and was often seen smoking a cigar and accompanied by her French Bulldogs. Under her management, Hotel Sacher became one of the finest hotels in the world, where the aristocracy and diplomats would meet. However, after World War I, Anna Sacher upheld the upper-class reputation of the hotel and denied service to guests of non-aristocratic descent while granting generous credit to impoverished aristocrats. Her management ran the business into financial problems, and eventually to bankruptcy and a change of ownership in the 1930s.

In 1934, the hotel business was taken over by the Gürtler family under the company name "Eduard Sacher GmbH & Co OHG", and the building was extensively renovated. After the end of World War II, Allied-occupied Austria, like Germany, was divided into four zones by the victorious powers. Vienna, like Berlin, was also subdivided into four zones. During the occupation, the British used the hardly damaged Hotel Sacher as their headquarters and it appears in Carol Reed's film The Third Man, as script writer Graham Greene was a regular at the hotel bar while doing research in Vienna. On August 4, 1947, two suitcase bombs exploded in the basement of the hotel. The terrorist group Irgun claimed responsibility for the bombing.

The building has undergone several subsequent renovations and extensions. A refurbishment by F+P Architekten involved a hotel complex comprising six existing buildings and included new attic floors, additional guestrooms, alterations to circulation and service areas, and the creation of a health-club area.

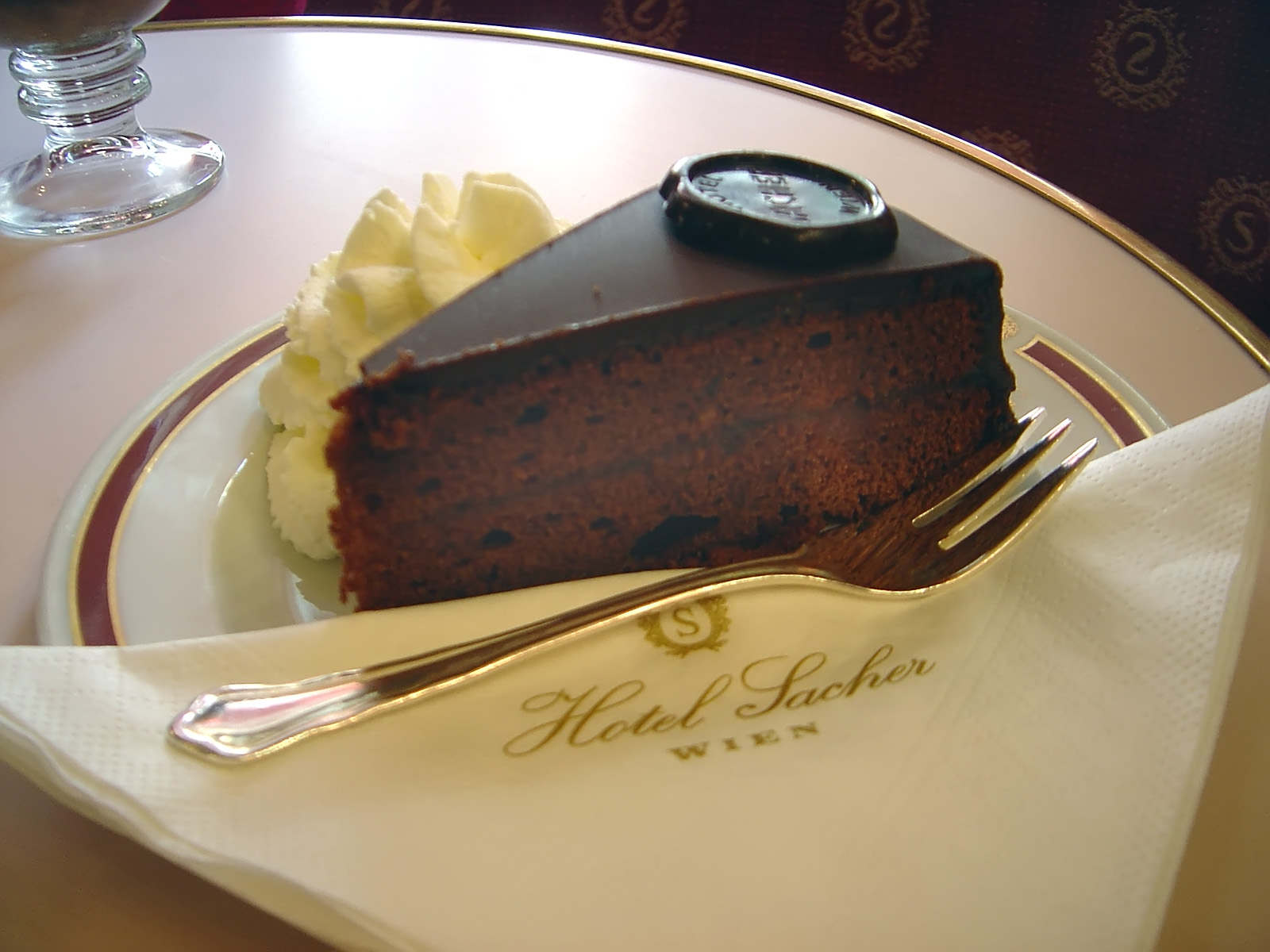
Sachertorte

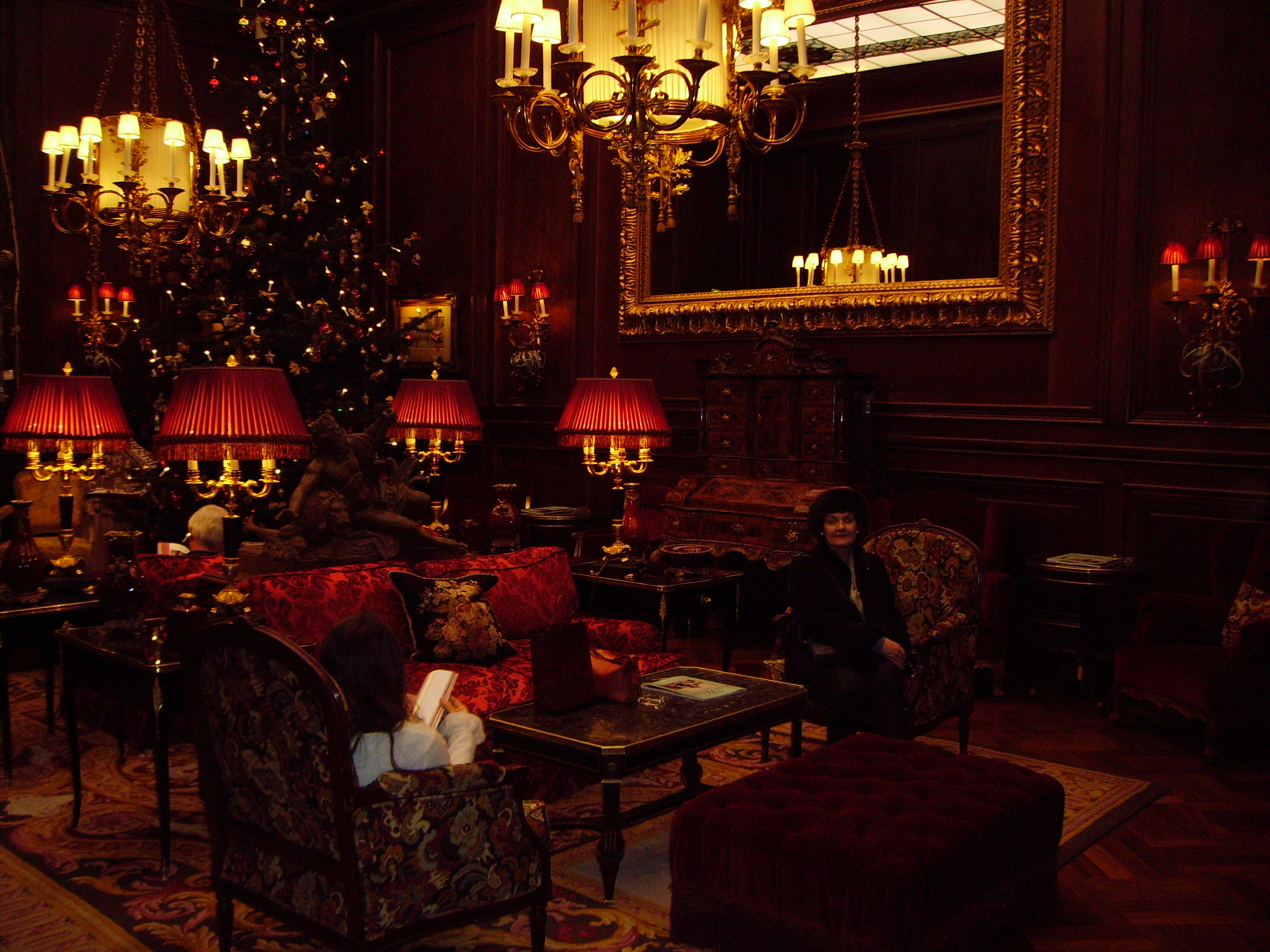
Evening in the lounge

Since 1988, Peter Gürtler acquired the former Österreichischer Hof hotel in Salzburg; it was renamed Hotel Sacher Salzburg in 2000. In the mid-2000s, Hotel Sacher Vienna underwent an extension that included two additional roof levels and a health-club and spa area.

== Notable guests ==
Among the famous guests over the decades were Emperor Franz Joseph, King Edward VIII, Wallis Simpson, Queen Elizabeth II, Prince Philip, Prince Rainier III of Monaco, Grace Kelly, President John F. Kennedy and many others. Being close to the opera house, Hotel Sacher has also been popular among artists such as Herbert von Karajan, Leonard Bernstein, Leo Slezak, Plácido Domingo, José Carreras, and Rudolf Nureyev.

On 31 March 1969, John Lennon and Yoko Ono gave a well received "Bagism" press conference in Hotel Sacher.

== In popular culture ==
Anna Sacher and her hotel were memorialised in Dennis Wheatley's 1950 novel about the outbreak of the First World War, The Second Seal. Appearing as herself, she plays a fictional role in the events of June/July 1914 in Vienna, aiding the book's hero the Duke de Richleau at several points.

The hotel appears in connection with the 1949 British film The Third Man, which was filmed in post-war Vienna. The film's screenwriter Graham Greene spent time in Vienna researching the city and its post-war conditions, and the Hotel Sacher became associated with the film through its depiction of occupied Vienna and its connection with Greene's research.

The hotel also found fame in the German-speaking world via the 1939 film Hotel Sacher, as well as by the popular Austrian TV series Hallo – Hotel Sacher … Portier!, starring Fritz Eckhardt. Romy Schneider stayed at Hotel Sacher during the shooting of Sissi in 1955. Director Ernst Marischka allegedly had been inspired by her resemblance to a statue of Empress Elisabeth in the hotel. The 2016 Austrian historical drama television series Das Sacher revolved around fictional events in the hotel.

== Amenities ==
The hotel has 152 rooms and suites. Facilities include a sauna, massage services and fitness facilities. The hotel's restaurants include the Rote Bar which serves Austrian cuisine and the Grüne Bar. Other venues include Café Sacher Wien and Café Bel Étage, both of which serve the Original Sachertorte.

== Recognition ==
Hotel Sacher has been a member of The Leading Hotels of the World since 1994. In 2025, it was ranked 49th in The World's 50 Best Hotels list. The hotel was also awarded three Michelin Keys in the 2025 Michelin Guide hotel selection.
