= Franz Sacher =

Austrian confectioner (1816-1907)

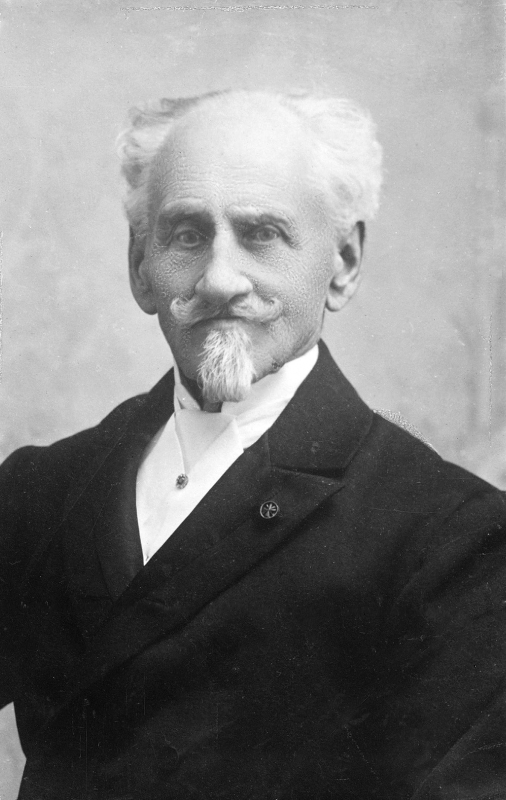
- Born: December 19, 1816; Vienna, Austrian Empire
- Died: March 11, 1907 (aged 90); Weikersdorf, Baden bei Wien, Austria-Hungary
- Occupation: Confectioner
- Known for: Inventing the sachertorte
- Children: 3

Franz Sacher (19 December 1816 – 11 March 1907) was an Austrian confectioner, best known as the inventor of the sachertorte.

== Biography ==
Sacher was born on 19 December 1816 in Vienna to Anton Sacher and Anna (nee Löw). It has been claimed by multiple sources that his family was Jewish, however Sacher did not publicly state he was ever Jewish, and it is debatable whether he was either born Jewish, but converted and hid his roots, or if he was simply Catholic.

According to Sacher's son Eduard, in 1832 Austria's minister of foreign affairs, Prince Metternich, ordered his court's kitchen to create a special dessert for a dinner to be attended by high-ranking guests. Dass er mir aber keine Schand' macht, heut' Abend! ('Let there be no shame on me tonight!'), he is reported to have declared. On the day of the dinner the chief cook of Metternich's household was taken ill, and the task of preparing the dessert had to be passed to Franz Sacher, then in his second year of apprenticeship at the palace. The result would be the chocolate cake devised on the spot by the 16-year-old trainee. The story was probably invented by Eduard many years later, to appeal to "Viennese nostalgic for their imperial past".

Sacher died in Baden bei Wien, and was buried in its Saint Helena Cemetery. Eduard opened the Hotel Sacher in 1876, near the State Opera House in Vienna. The Sachertorte is said to have been instrumental in spreading the fame of the hotel; or perhaps the other way around. The exact recipe as created by Sacher himself is a closely guarded secret.

== Personal life ==
Franz Sacher and his wife Rosa (nee Wieninger) had three sons.

- Franz (died 1889; age: 48/49) took over the business of his father in the 1860s, and later became the restaurateur and hotelier in Bucharest, then Head of Marine Casinos in Pula;
- Eduard (1843–1892) founded the Hotel Sacher in Vienna in 1876;
- Carl (1849–1929) founded Sacher's Hotel & Curanstalt in Helenental in 1881.

== Tribute ==
On 19 December 2016, Google celebrated Sacher's 200th birthday with a Google Doodle.
