= Milk coffee =

Category of coffee-based drinks

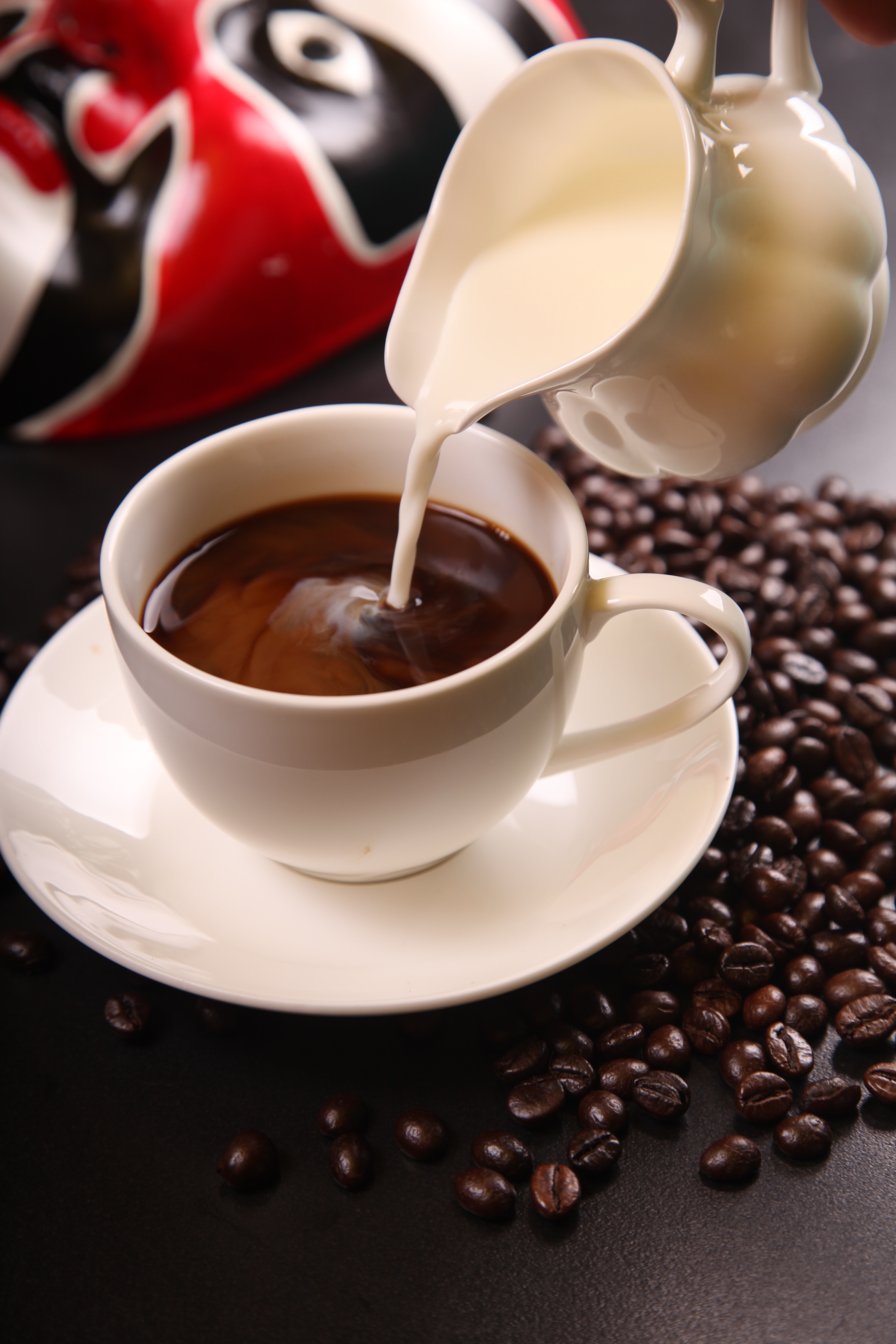
Coffee with milk

Milk coffee is a category of coffee-based drinks made with milk. Johan Nieuhof, the Dutch ambassador to China, is credited as the first person to drink coffee with milk when he experimented with it around 1660.

== Varieties ==
=== Breve ===
Breve (BREH-vay) is an espresso made with a steamed mixture of half milk and half cream (i.e., half and half). Its size can vary. The name relates to the use of cream and milk.

=== Café au lait ===
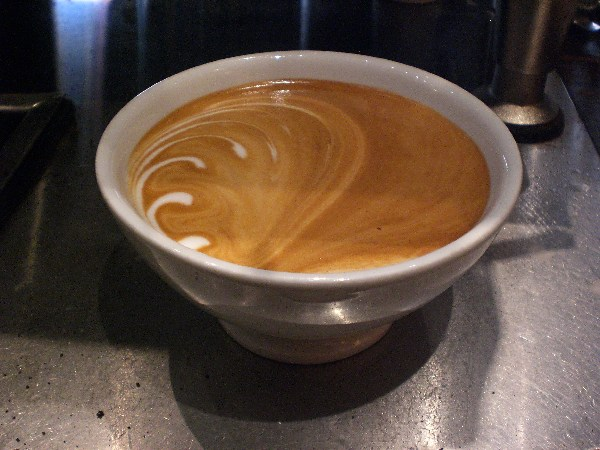
Café au lait served in Oslo, Norway

Café au lait is the French way of preparing 'coffee with milk' both at home and in cafés in Europe. Café au lait stems from the same continental tradition as caffè latte in Italy, café con leche in Spain, kawa biała ('white coffee') in Poland, tejeskávé in Hungary, Milchkaffee in Germany, and Wiener Melange in Austria.

=== Cafe hafuch ===
Cafe hafuch is a popular drink in Israel. Steamed milk is first added to the cup, then espresso is carefully added to give a layered appearance. Milk foam is sometimes spooned on to the top to finish. 'Upside down' refers to this method of adding the ingredients, as in most milk-and-coffee drinks, the coffee is first in the cup, and the milk goes in second.

=== Egg coffee ===
Egg coffee is a Vietnamese drink which is traditionally prepared with egg yolks, sugar, condensed milk and Robusta coffee in the Central Highlands of Vietnam, where 70% of global Robusta coffee is cultivated.

=== Flat white ===
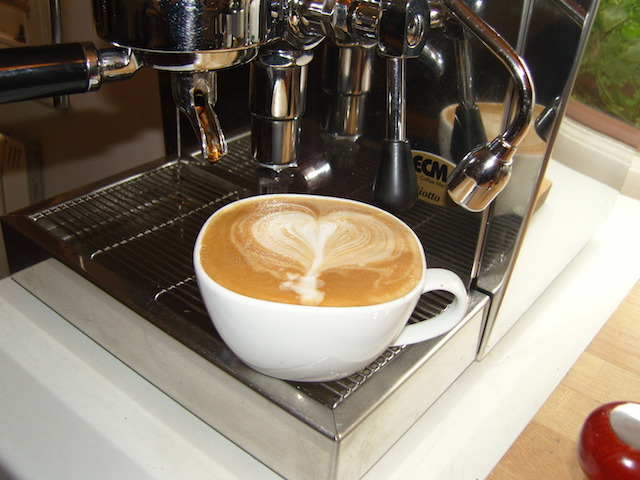
A flat white with latte art

Flat white is an espresso with a similar proportion of coffee to milk as a latte and a cappuccino, the main difference being the texture of the milk and (in some regions) the number of espresso shots.

It became popular in New Zealand in the late 1980s and has since spread to the UK, where it was first served at independent cafes in London such as Department of Coffee and Social Affairs and Speak Easy where owners and staff from Australia and New Zealand brought the style of coffee into the UK before being adopted by chains Costa Coffee and Starbucks. Available in the form of a 12 oz. double latte from Starbucks in the US since January 6, 2015, it is rarely found in continental Europe.

=== Galão ===
Galão is a hot drink from Portugal made with espresso and foamed milk. Similar to caffè latte or café au lait, it comes in a tall glass with plenty of milk. With only half milk, it is known as meia de leite. In Madeira, a large, milky coffee is known as a chinesa (lit. 'Chinese lady').

=== Kopi susu ===
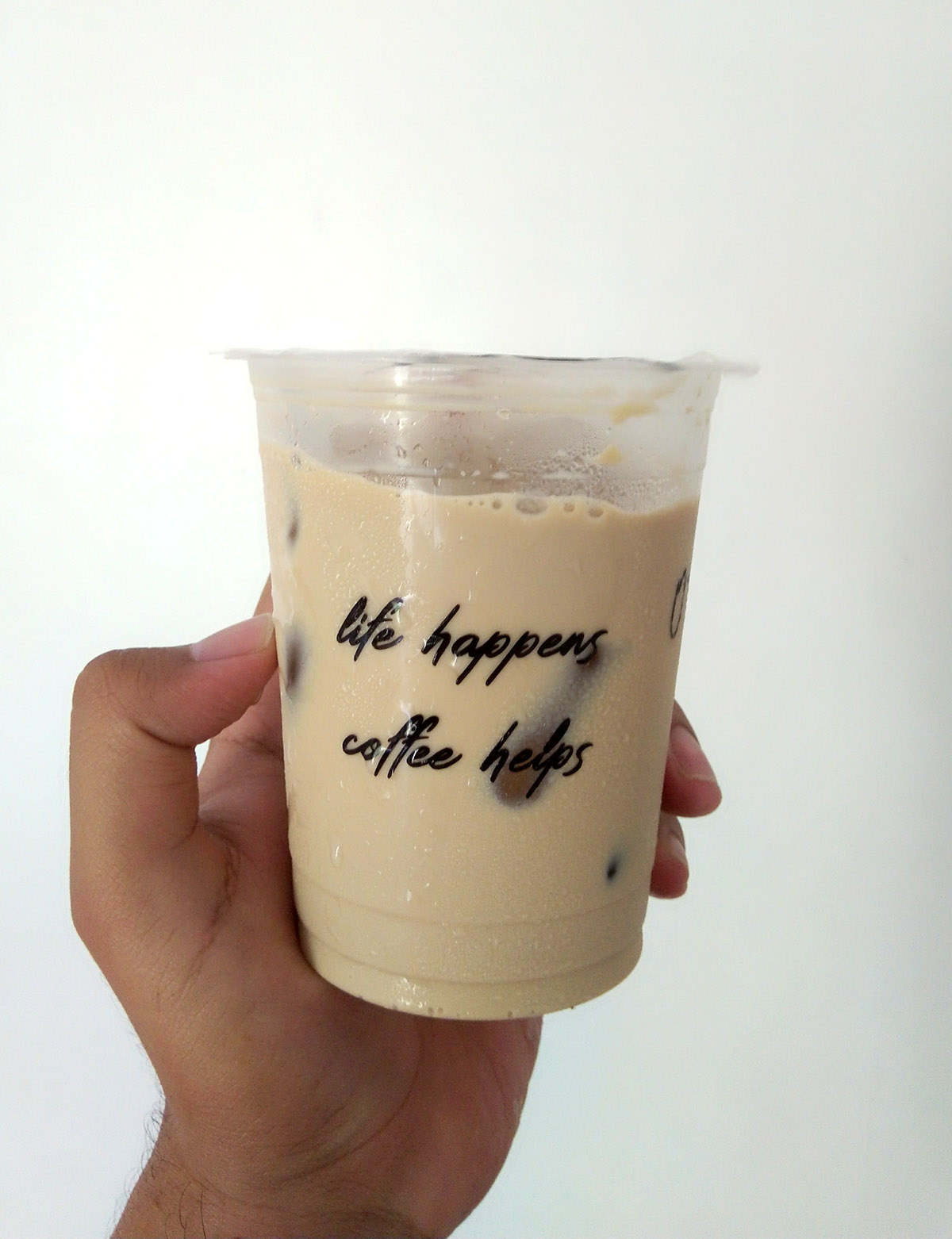
Indonesian es kopi susu gula aren

Kopi susu ('milk coffee') is found in (at least) Brunei, Indonesia, and is very similar to the Vietnamese cà phê sữa nóng. Served in a glass, kopi susu is made by mixing black coffee (Arabica) with about a quarter to half a glass of sweetened condensed milk, which is then let stand to cool and allow the grounds to sink to the bottom. Another version of kopi susu uses fresh milk.

In Indonesia, milk coffee with ice and palm sugar is called es kopi susu gula aren.

=== Latte ===
Latte is an espresso and steamed milk, generally in a 1:3 to 1:5 ratio of espresso to milk, with a little foam on top.

=== Caffè macchiato ===
Caffè macchiato is an espresso with a dash of foamed milk. At first sight it resembles a small cappuccino, but even if the ingredients are the same as those used for cappuccino, a macchiato has a much stronger and aromatic taste. The milk is foamed directly into the espresso cup, which is then put under the coffee outlet. The espresso is then drawn into the cup. Cocoa is sometimes sprinkled over the drink.

=== Wiener melange ===
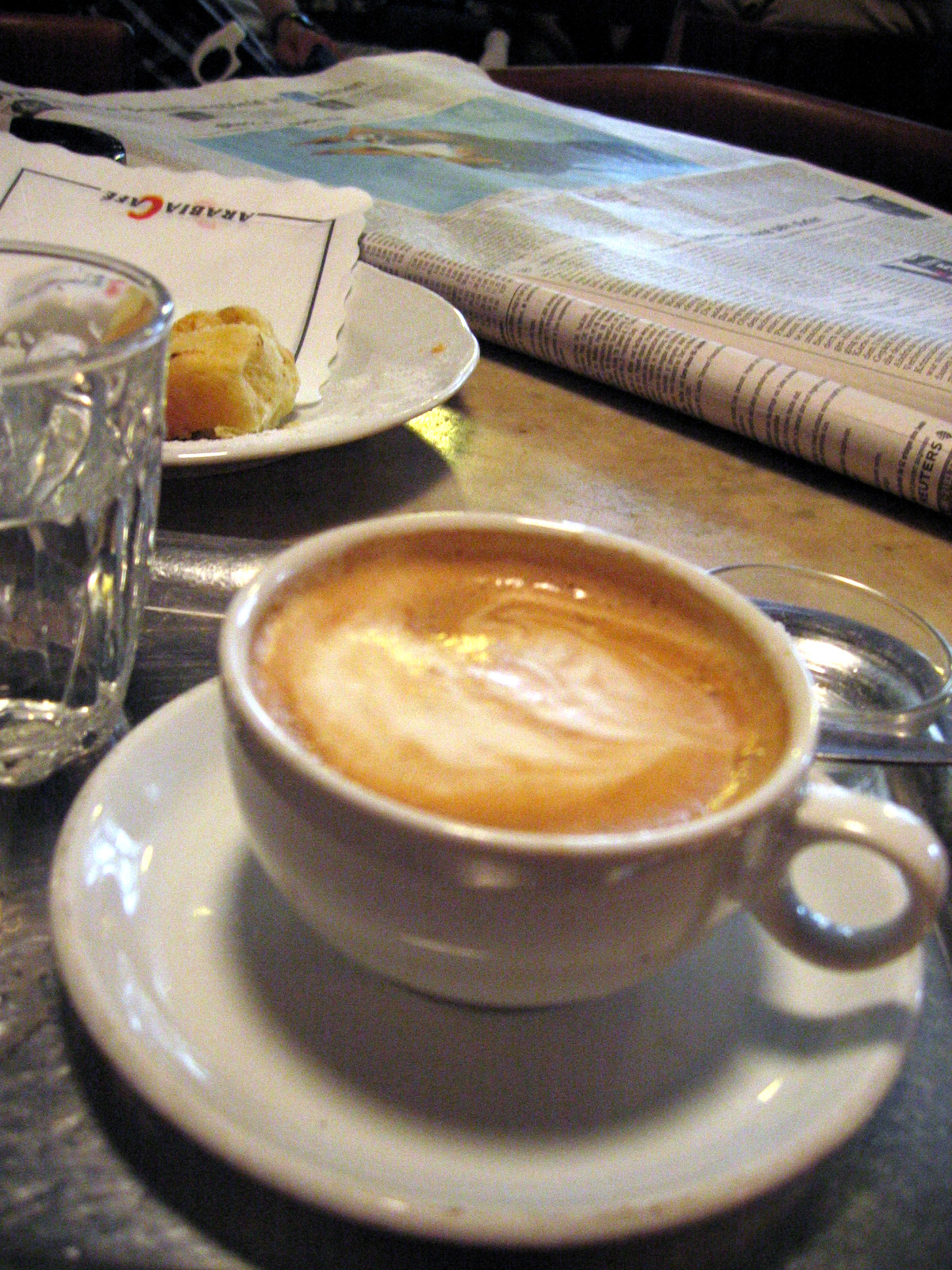
A Wiener melange

Wiener Melange is a coffee drink similar to a cappuccino. The difference is sometimes assumed to be that the Melange is made with milder coffee; however, the Viennese coffee company Julius Meinl describes a Wiener Melange as "One small espresso served in a large cup of coffee. Steam milk and add milk foam to coffee (=small milk coffee)". At Cafe Sperl in Vienna, the Melange is 1/2 cup "black coffee" and 1/2 cup creamy milk, completed by milk foam.

=== Wiener coffee ===
Wiener coffee (not to be confused with "Vienna roast" coffee), also known as Vienna coffee, is coffee or espresso topped with whipped cream. Milk is sometimes poured into the coffee/espresso before adding the whipped cream. Vanilla, chocolate or cinnamon is sometimes sprinkled on the cream. Melange mit schlag (or schlagobers) is the Austrian term for coffee with whipped cream. Austria has a number of coffees with whipped cream.

=== Coffee regular ===
A "regular coffee" or "coffee regular" is a popular drink in New England. In much of New England, a "regular coffee" refers to coffee with cream and sugar. The most common amount usually includes three creams and three sugars. A "coffee regular" can be had either hot or as iced coffee.

=== Nus Nus ===
Nus Nus ('half half') is a traditional Moroccan coffee made with equal parts espresso and steamed milk.

=== Camargo ===
Strong pour over coffee mixed with sugar and foaming milk straight from the cow's udder on the first milking of the day, commonly consumed by farmers in the highlands in south Brazil.

== See also ==
Media related to Coffee with milk at Wikimedia Commons

- List of coffee beverages
