= Leopold Hawelka =

Austrian coffee house owner (1911–2011)

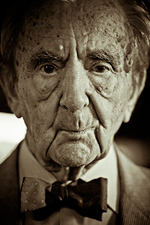
- Leopold Hawelka, 2008
- Born: 11 April 1911; Staatz, Lower Austria, Austria
- Died: 29 December 2011 (aged 100); Vienna, Austria
- Occupation: Coffee house owner
- Spouse: Josefine Hawelka (m. 1936–2005)
- Children: 2

Leopold Hawelka (April 11, 1911 – December 29, 2011) was an Austrian coffee house owner. He and his wife, Josefine Hawelka, founded and operated Café Hawelka ("Künstlerkaffeehaus Hawelka").

== Life and career ==
Hawelka was born in Staatz-Kautendorf. His parents were of Bohemian ancestry. His father was a shoemaker from Jáchymov near Osová Bítýška in Bohemia. At Leopold's age of 14, the family settled in Vienna, and he began to work in the Deierl restaurant, where he met Josefine Danzberger. They married in 1936 and opened their first café, Kaffee Alt Wien, on the Bäckerstrasse. They later opened a new café, Café Hawelka, on Dorotheergasse. During World War II, the Hawelkas were not able to operate their business. After the war, in September 1945, the Hawelkas reopened their café, the building of which survived the war largely intact.

In the early post-war years, the Hawelka's clientele still consisted of pensioners, traders from the nearby Dorotheum and former aristocrats who had been forced to leave their homes. The Hawelkas supplied their locale with fig coffee, alcoholic beverages and cigarettes via surreptitious traders. Leopold Hawelka took care of the guests until his old age, received them personally, showed them to their seats and said goodbye to them again. He not only made sure that his two children, who grew up in the pub, greeted the guests in a friendly manner and did not disturb them, but also that gentlemen did not address ladies. Such were banned from the premises by him.

Josefine Hawelka died in March 2005. Their son, Günther Hawelka, continued baking the café's speciality, Buchteln pastries, using his mother's recipe. Leopold turned 100 on April 11, 2011.
