= Café Hawelka =

Viennese café in Vienna, Austria

Coordinates: 48°12′28″N 16°22′10″E

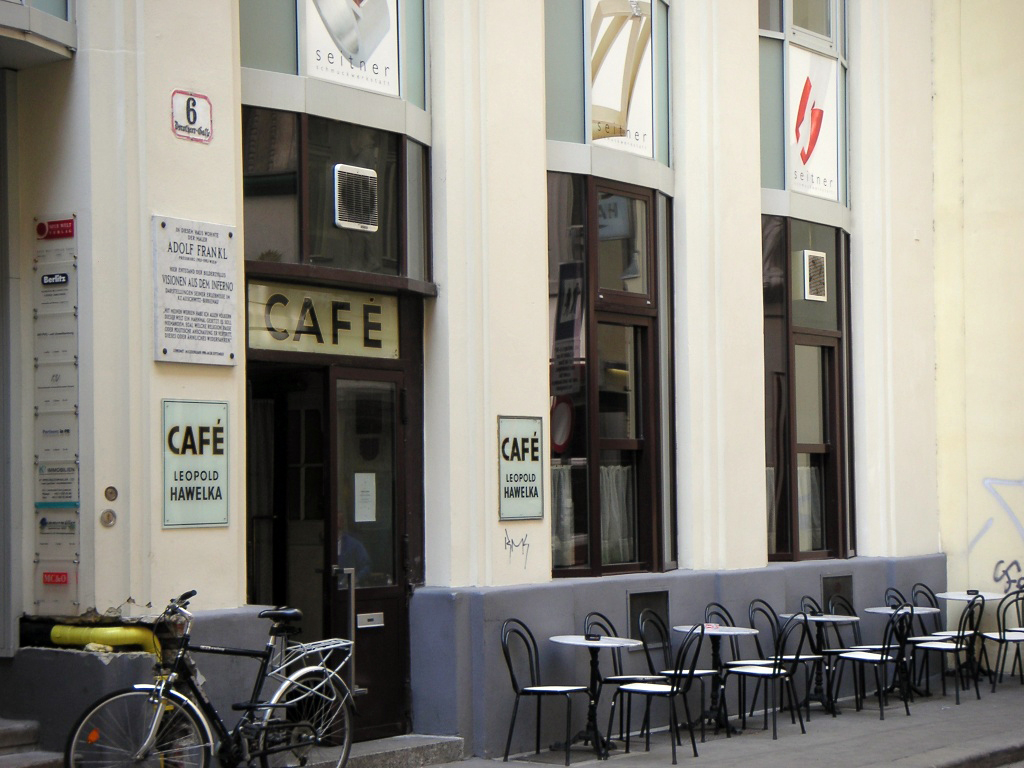
Café Hawelka

Café Hawelka (German: [kaˈfeː ˈhaːvelka]) is a traditional Viennese café located at Dorotheergasse 6 in the Innere Stadt, the first district of Vienna, Austria.

== History ==
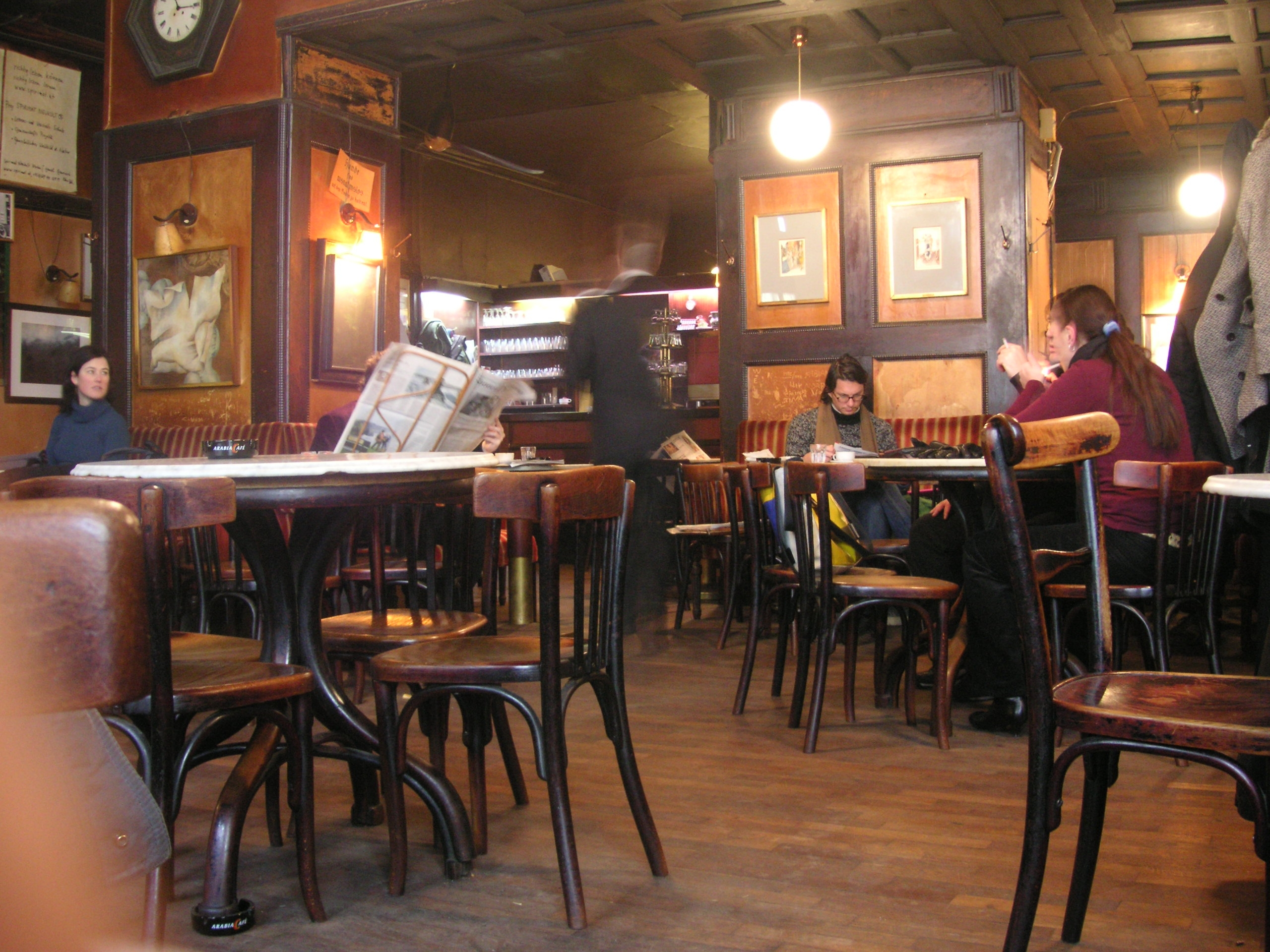
Café Hawelka on a quiet Thursday morning

The Café Hawelka was opened by Leopold Hawelka in 1939. Hawelka had previously operated the Kaffee Alt Wien on Bäckerstraße since 1936 and together with his wife Josefine took over the Café Ludwig in the Dorotheergasse in May 1939. This spot was originally the location of the "Chatham Bar" opened in 1906. For two decades in the recent past, it was wrongly believed that the original venue was called "Je t'aime-Bar". After the outbreak of World War II, the Hawelka had to be closed, and in autumn 1945 it was reopened in the still largely intact building.

After the end of the period of occupation after 1955, the café quickly became a meeting point for writers and critics like Heimito von Doderer, Albert Paris Gütersloh, Hilde Spiel, Friedrich Torberg and Hans Weigel. After the closing of the Café Herrenhof in 1961, even more artists gathered here, and it became a central meeting place in the art scene of the time. Regular guests included Friedrich Achleitner, H. C. Artmann, Konrad Bayer, Ernst Fuchs, Friedensreich Hundertwasser, Rudolf Hausner, Wolfgang Hutter, Helmut Qualtinger, Gerhard Rühm, and Oskar Werner. In the sixties and seventies, the café experienced its peak. The artistic atmosphere of the café also inspired Georg Danzer's 1976 song Jö, schau (...was macht ein Nackerter im Hawelka).

Josefine Hawelka died on 22 March 2005 after managing the café for sixty-six years with her husband. She had baked the place's specialty, its Buchteln desserts (which are still made by Günther Hawelka, son of Josefine and Leopold, according to the old recipe). Until his death in 2011, Leopold Hawelka could still be found sitting at its entrance, greeting guests.

After Leopold Hawelka's death in 2011, his son Günter Hawelka took over management of the café. Günter continued the family tradition until his death in 2021, at the age of 81. The café is now run by the third generation of the family, Amir and Michael Hawelka, who also oversee the family's coffee roastery.

== Melange ==
Café Hawelka serves a Melange (similar to a cappuccino) at a cost of €4.80 (as of December 2023).

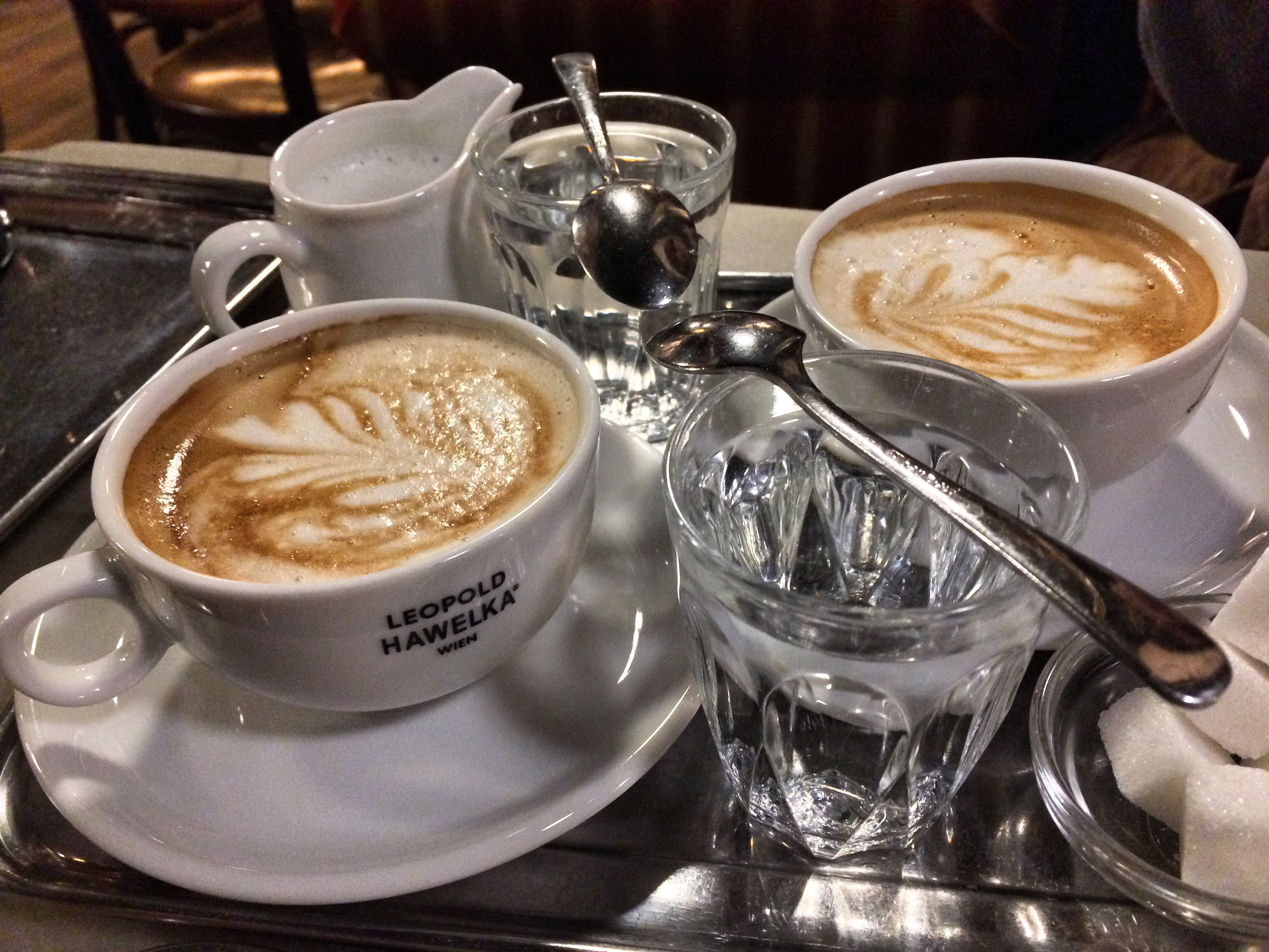
Hawelka coffee

== See also ==
- List of restaurants in Vienna
