= Kaffee Alt Wien =

Café in Vienna

Coordinates: 48°12′33″N 16°22′34″E

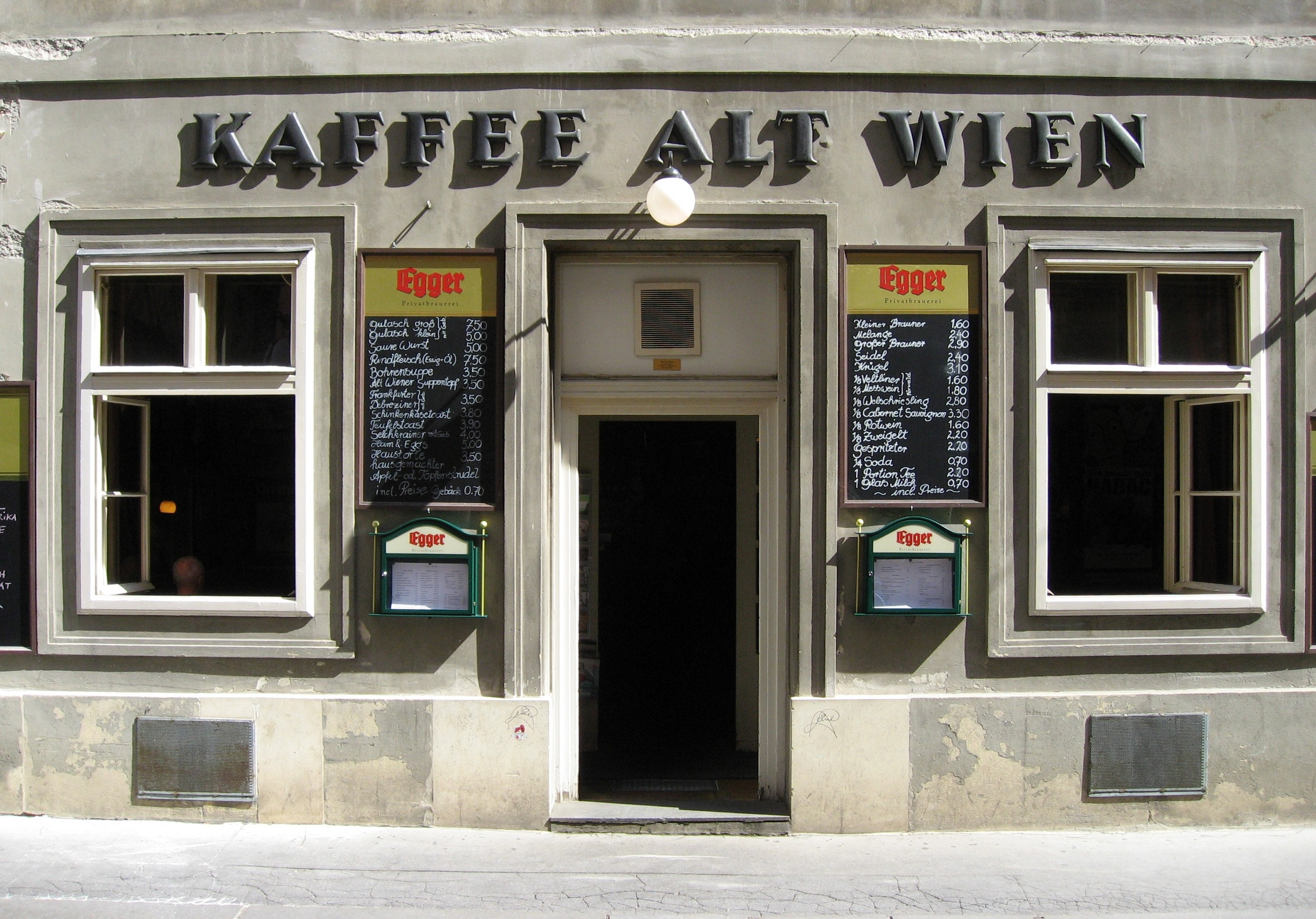
Kaffee Alt Wien

Kaffee Alt Wien is a traditional Viennese café located at Bäckerstraße 9 in the Innere Stadt first district in Vienna, Austria.

It was established on 14 October 1922 and taken over in 1936 by Leopold Hawelka and his wife Josefine on the day after their wedding. They ran the café until 1939 at which time they moved to Dorotheergasse, where they opened a new coffee house, Café Hawelka. Since the 1980s, the Kaffee Alt Wien has developed into a night café with a relaxed atmosphere. The restaurant is famously known for its goulash and the traditional coffee.

Informally considered an artistic hub, in 1976, a notable happening by the Viennese artist Gottfried Helnwein took place in the café. The walls of the cafe are largely covered by posters advertising music, theatre and arts events in Vienna and the surrounding areas.

== See also ==
- List of restaurants in Vienna
