= Wilhelm J. Sluka =

Coordinates: 48°12′33.8″N 16°21′27.9″E

Wilhelm J. Sluka Nfg. GmbH
- Company type: limited liability company
- Industry: Konditorei and café
- Founded: 1891; 135 years ago
- Founder: Wilhelm Josef Sluka
- Headquarters: Vienna, Austria
- Key people: Robert Beranek (director)
- Products: Cakes, chocolates, coffee
- Website: www.sluka.at

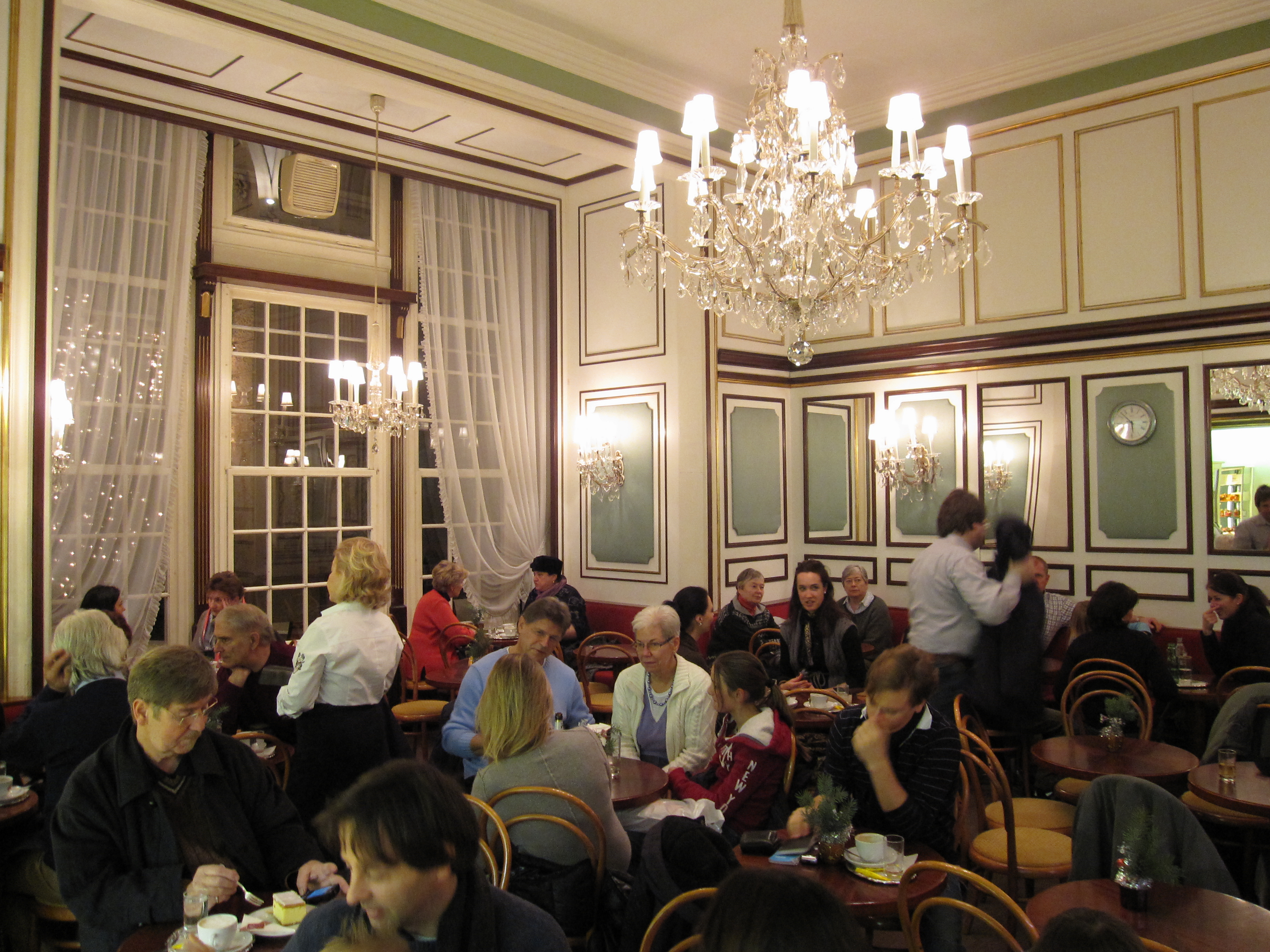
Conditorei Sluka

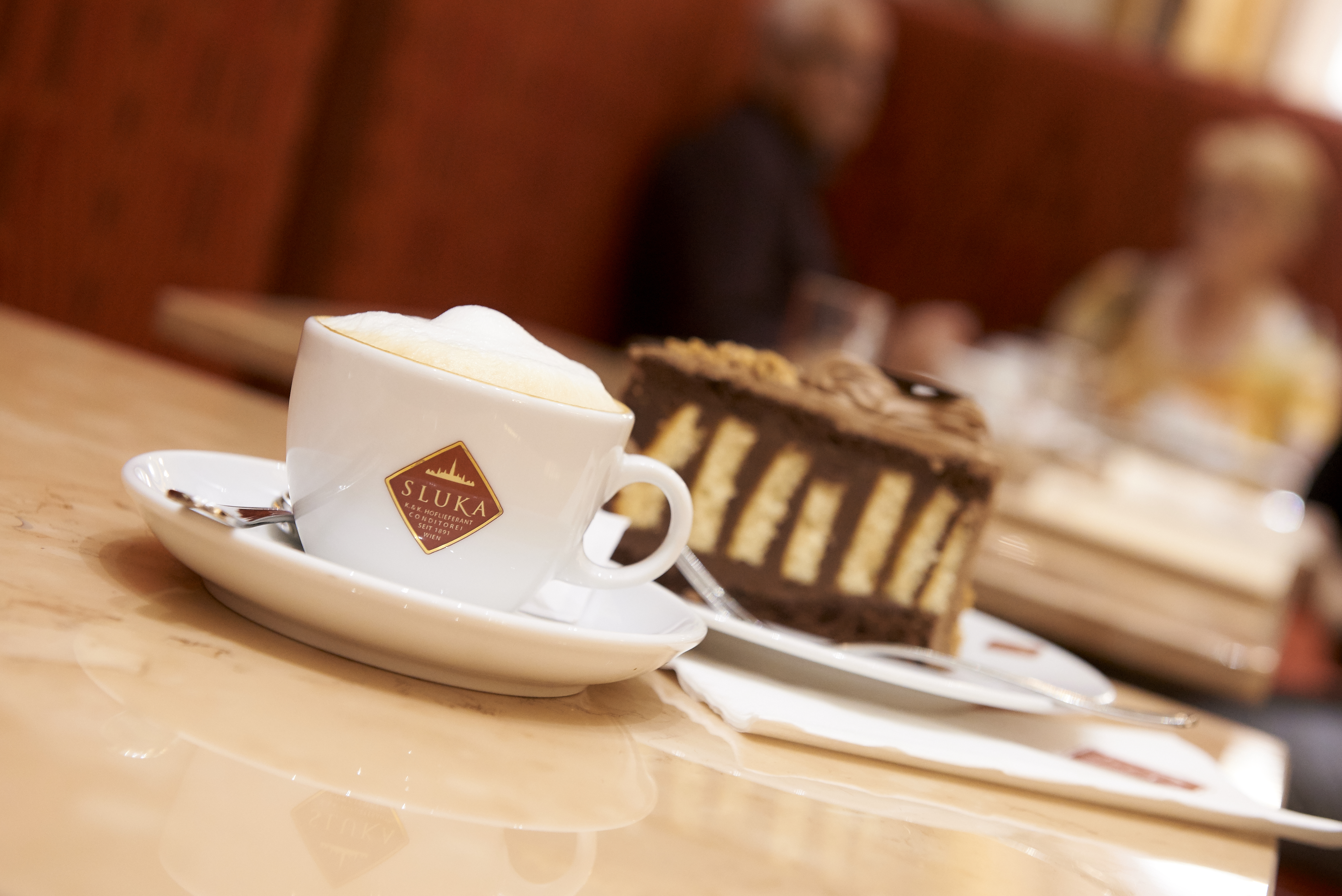
Cake and coffee at Sluka

Wilhelm J. Sluka or the Conditorei Sluka is a famous Konditorei and café in Vienna, and a traditional k.u.k. Hoflieferant. It is located at Rathausplatz 8 (previously Reichsratsstrasse 13) in the first district of Vienna, the Innere Stadt.

== History ==
The Konditorei was founded in 1891 by Wilhelm Josef Sluka and his wife Josefine. On the basis of his high-quality products Sluka received in 1896 the title of "confectioner to the k.u.k. court" ("k.u.k. Hofzuckerbäcker"). The café was patronised by customers of the highest social strata, including the Empress Elisabeth. Its central location and discreet atmosphere attracted ministers and representatives from the nearby Parliament Building on the Ringstrasse, gentlemen from the Rathaus, stars of the Burgtheater and members of the nobility and bourgeoisie.

Sluka still enjoys great popularity, particularly among tourists.

In 2000 the establishment was awarded the Goldene Kaffeebohne ("Golden Coffee-Bean") by Jacobs.

== See also ==
- Demel
- List of restaurants in Vienna
- Sluka
