= Café Restaurant Residenz =

Classical Viennese coffee house in Austria

Coordinates: 48°11′8″N 16°18′49.5″E

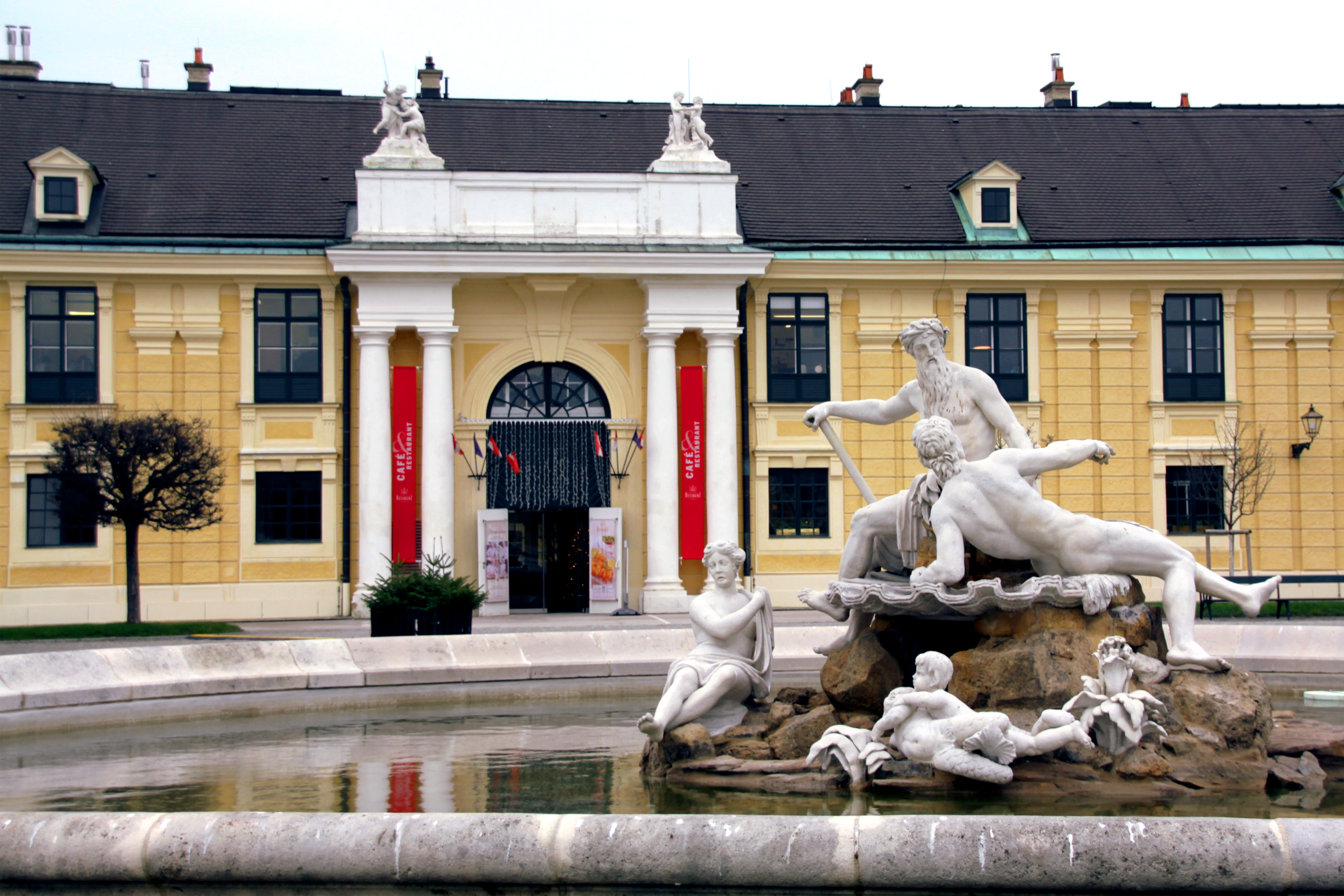
The Café Restaurant Residenz in the Schönbrunn Palace, Vienna

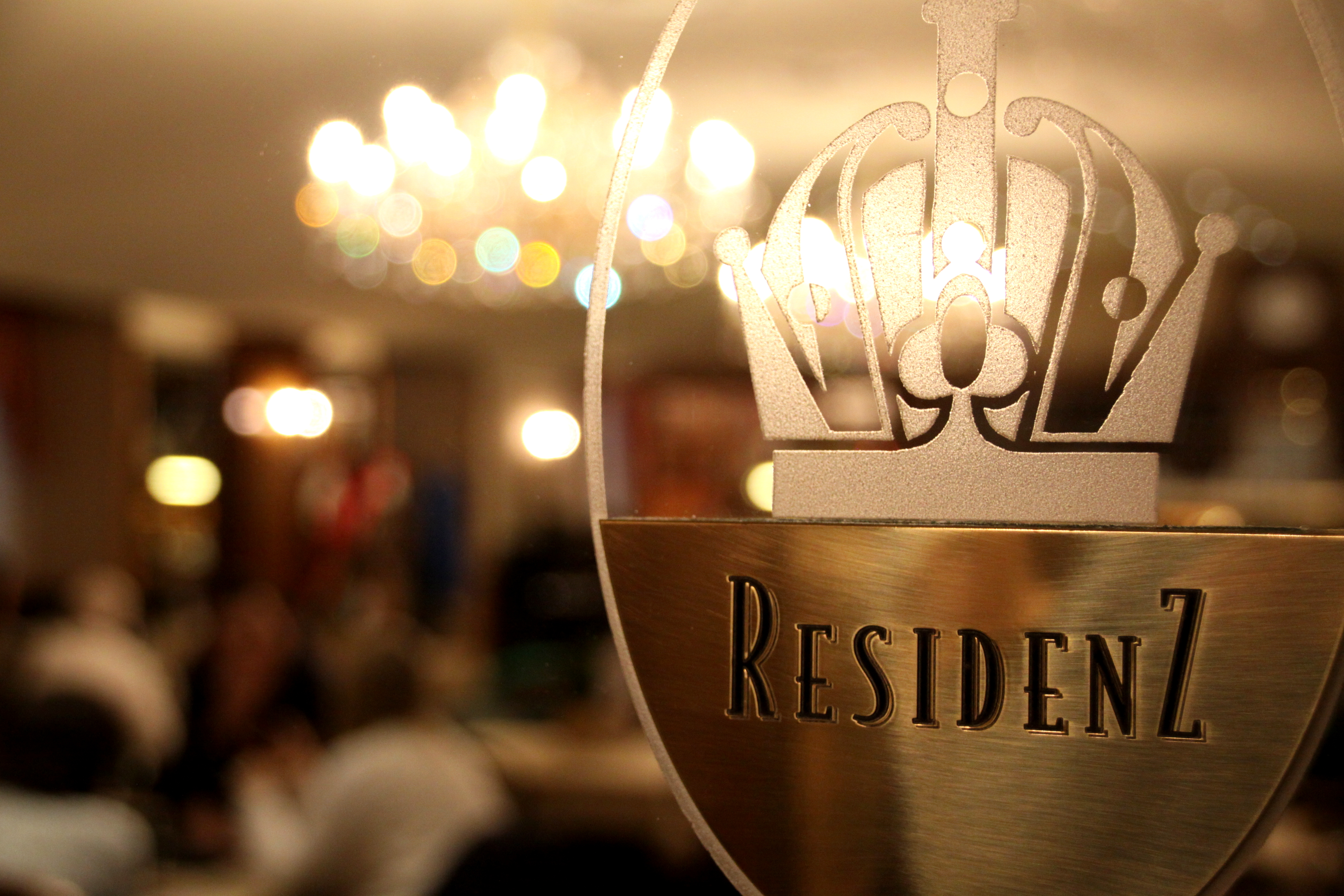
Entrance of the Café

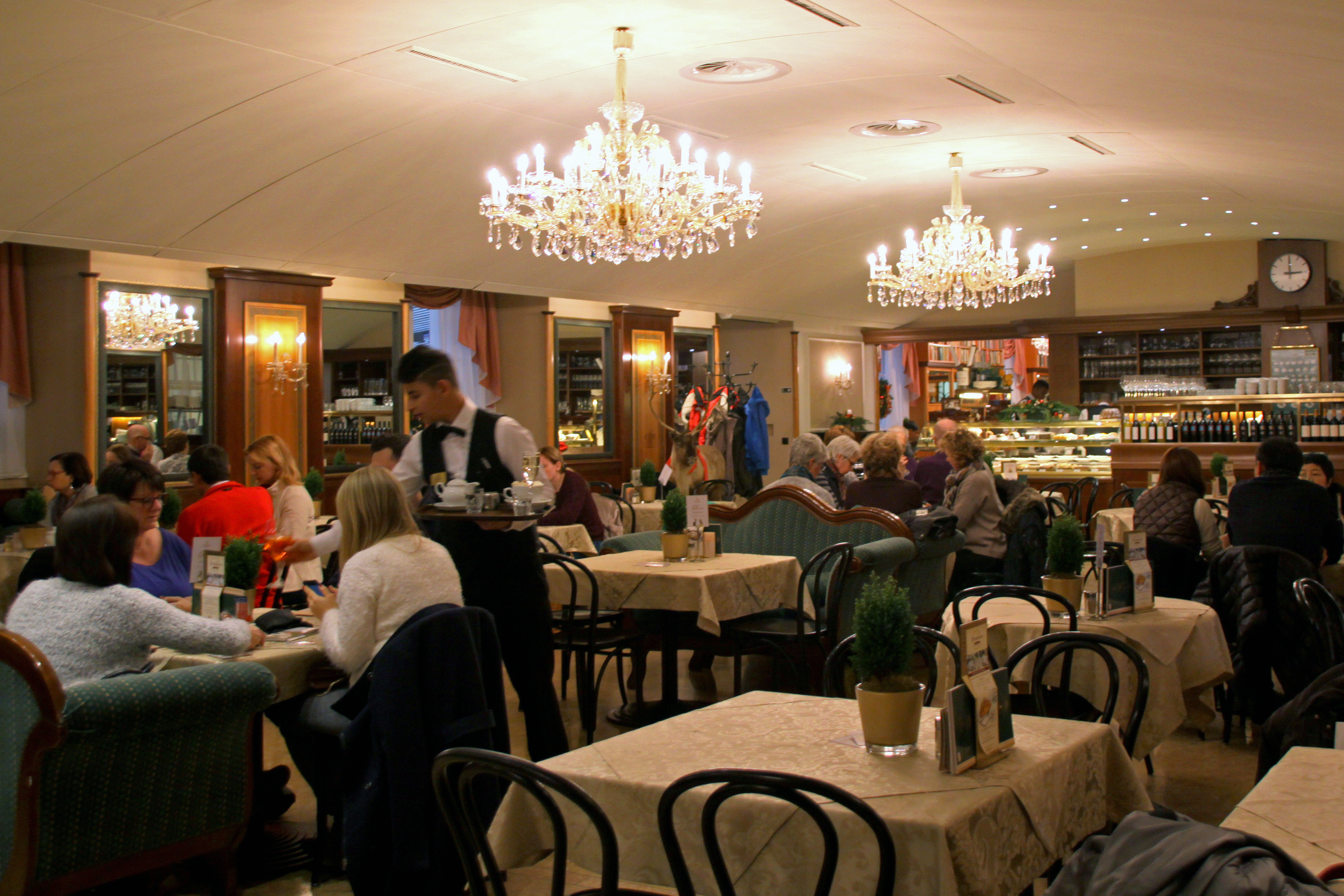
The Great Coffeehouse Saloon

Café Restaurant Residenz is a classical Viennese coffee house which is located in the eastern wing of Schloss Schönbrunn in the 13th Viennese district.

== History ==
During the emperor’s time, the rooms of the café were more of a “police kitchen”. The place was used to provide the guards of Schloss Schönbrunn with food. In 1948, the guards were granted permission to use the place as a restaurant; it was leased several times later on.

The café has been run by the Querfeld family since 1998. Its name, “Café Restaurant Residenz”, refers to emperor Franz Joseph I, who declared Schloss Schönbrunn his main residence. The name “Café Restaurant Residenz” was chosen in honor of Emperor Franz Joseph I, who declared Schönbrunn Palace to be his year-round residence in 1904.

== Details ==
=== Strudel Show ===
The daily strudel show is held in the Schaubackstube (bakery) underneath the Café Residenz every full hour. After the 20-minute show, every participant receives the “Original Viennese Apple Strudel Recipe”.

=== Apple Strudel Seminar ===
The apple strudel seminar is also organized in the bakehouse of Café Residenz. Under the guidance of an experienced pastry chef, each participant of the seminar creates his or her own apple strudel and receives a diploma including the original recipe as a reward.

=== Trivia ===
Café Residenz can also be used for punch welcomes on the terrace, buffets, Christmas parties or dinners for up to 300 people. The piano is played in the Great Coffeehouse Saloon every Saturday and Sunday from 2 until 4 pm.

== See also ==
- List of restaurants in Vienna

== Literature ==
- Hans Veigl: Wiener Kaffeehausführer. Kremayr und Scheriau, Wien 2001, ISBN 978-3-218-00587-6.
- Stadtbekannt.at: Kaffee in Wien. Holzbaum Verlag, Wien 2014, ISBN 978-3-902-98014-4.
