= Sluka =

Sluka (Czech and Slovak feminine: Sluková) is a Czech and Slovak surname, derived from sluka meaning "woodcock", and originating either as a name for a shy, nervous person, or as an occupational name for a fowler. The name may refer to:

- Anton Sluka, Slovak athlete
- Bohdan Sluka (born 1988), Ukrainian football player
- Branislav Sluka (born 1999), Slovak football player
- Luboš Sluka (born 1928), Czech composer
- Marián Sluka (born 1979), Slovak football player
- Markéta Sluková (born 1988), Czech beach volleyball player
- Wilhelm J. Sluka (1861–1932), Austrian businessman

== See also ==
- Letov LK-2 Sluka, a Czech ultralight aircraft
