= Aida (café) =

Austrian regional chain of coffeehouses

- Industry: Coffee, confectionery
- Founded: 1925; 101 years ago in Vienna, Austria
- Founder: Josef Prousek
- Headquarters: Floridsdorf, Vienna, Austria
- Number of locations: 34
- Key people: Dominik Prousek (executive director)

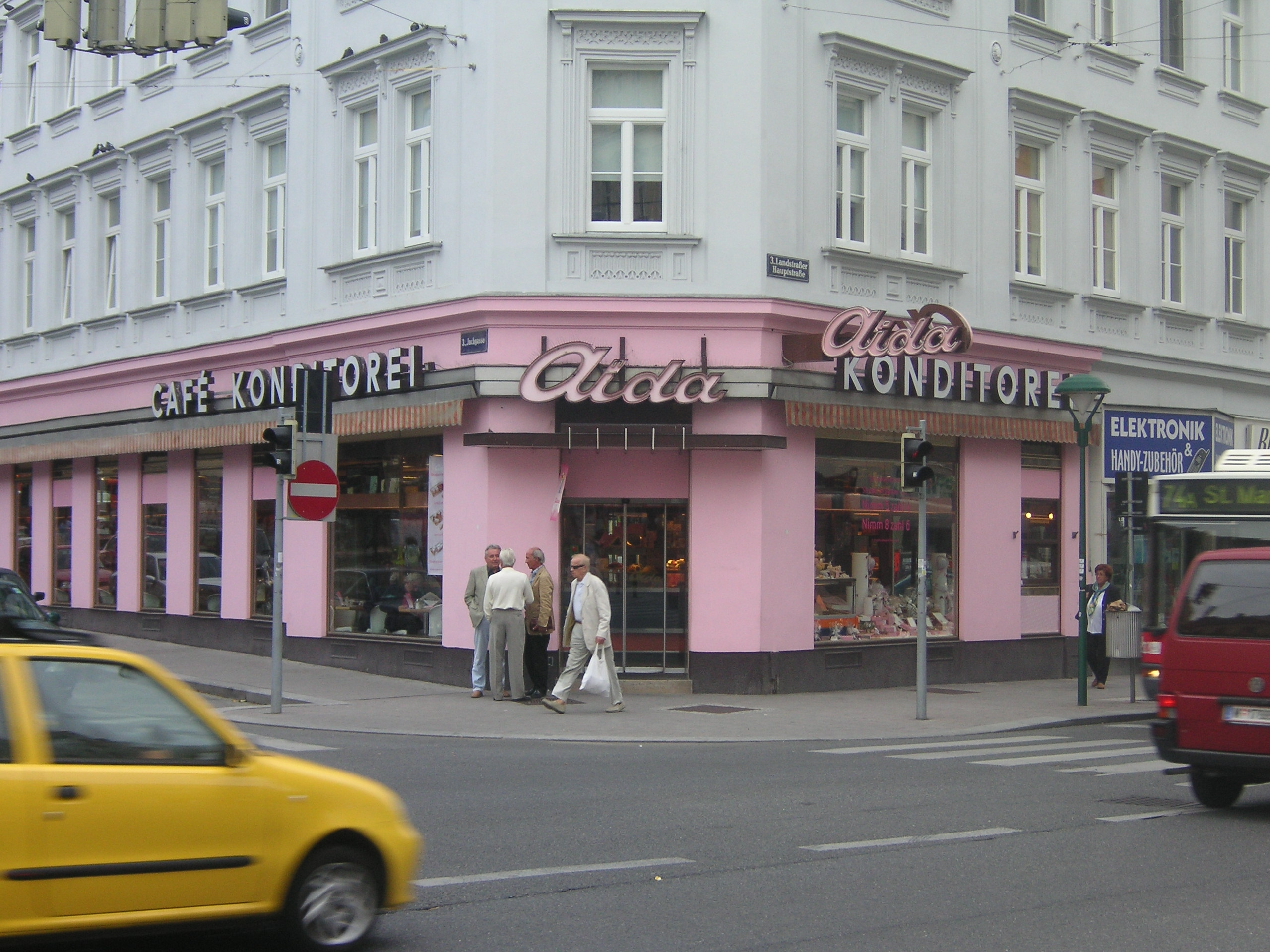
An Aida in Landstraße as seen from the outside ...

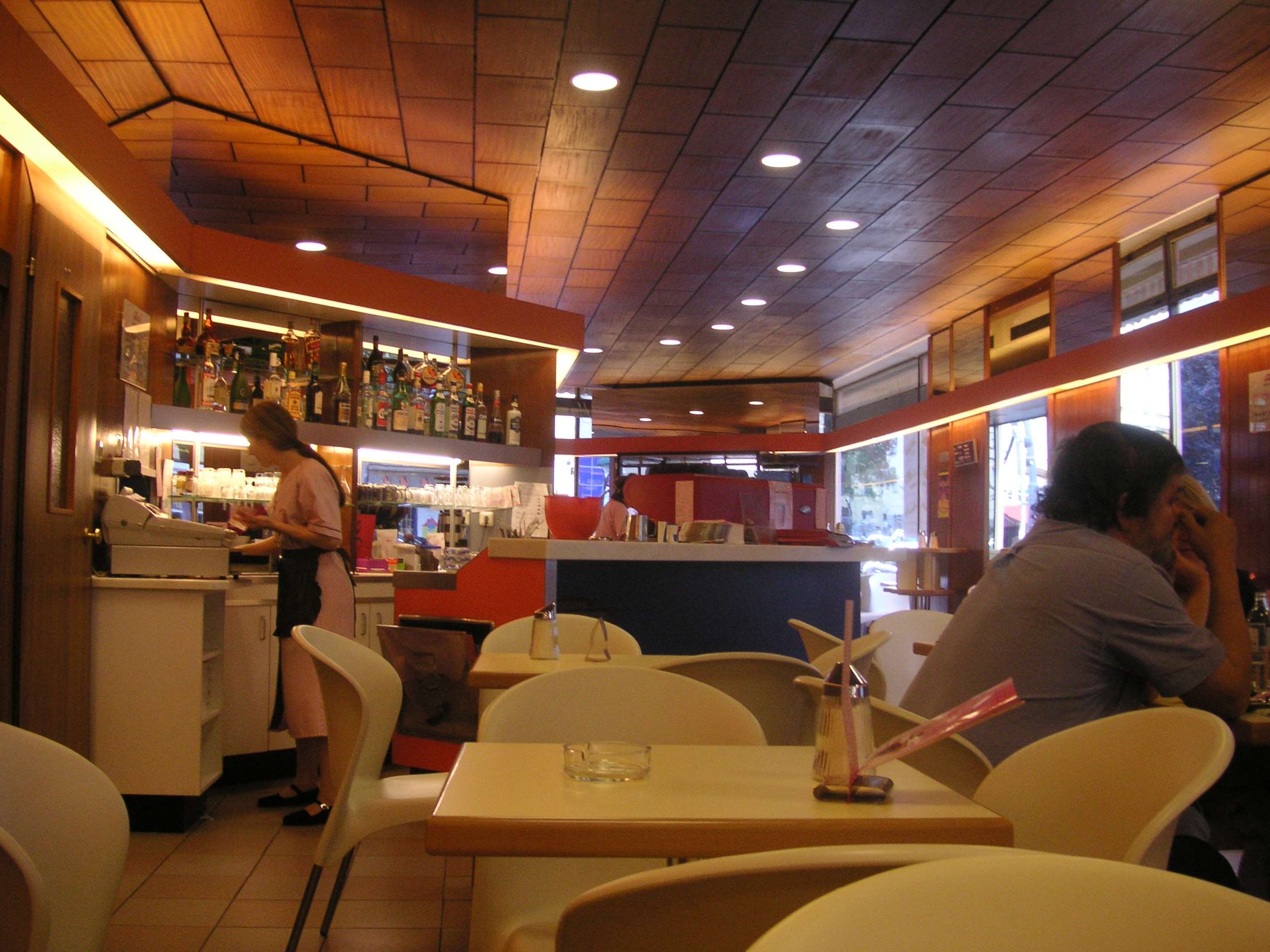
... and from the inside

Aida (sometimes spelled Aïda, with a diaeresis) is a franchise chain of 34 espresso bar and pastry shops (Café-Konditorei) based in Vienna, Austria, with franchise outlets globally. They are also known to be the largest and most exclusive privately owned confectionery producer and coffee shop brand in Europe with confectioners producing up to 3 tons of cakes and pastries daily.

In 2006, Aida's coffee was awarded the Golden Coffee Bean by Gault-Millau.

== History ==
Ten Aida shops had been established before the Second World War, but they were all destroyed during the air raids on Vienna. After the war, Felix Prousek (1918–2003) took over the management and started rebuilding and expanding. His innovative approach to coffeehouse culture resulted in an alternative to the sheer Gemütlichkeit of the traditional Viennese café. Prousek was also one of the first to introduce Italian-style espresso machines in Austria.

However, for decades now, Aida has been resistant to change of any kind. This is first and foremost true of their interior design, very similar for all shops and reminiscent of the 1950s-1970s. Their trademark colours are pink and dark brown. Most of the furniture is made of plastic, and there is mostly seating without upholstery.

Aida has also been reluctant to adapt to changing tastes and to compete with new arrivals in Vienna such as Starbucks, for example by refusing to add flavoured coffee to their list of beverages. The specialties are Coffee, Cakes, Pastry, Tea, Merchandise, Snacks, Ice Cream and Gifts.

In most shops a quick coffee while standing up at the bar is possible. However, the majority of customers prefer to sit down and be served at their table. Aida was staffed exclusively by women (in pink uniforms), but since 2008 also men started working.

Felix Prousek's son, Michael, who had collaborated with his father since the 1980s, is now Aida's managing director. Their headquarters and central bakery are located in Floridsdorf. As his son Dominik Prousek Aida's Executive Director saw the possibility to franchise the chain globally he did so by selling master franchises in 2010 to The Kingdom of Saudi Arabia, Croatia, Kazakhstan, Bosnia and Canada. The Prousek family aims to make AIDA the world's largest Viennese pastry chain globalizing traditional Viennese coffeehouse culture, music and flair.

== Reviews ==
The Internet has seen a proliferation of tourist guides describing Viennese coffeehouse culture. Some of these reports also comment on Aida, for example in the following way:

Coffee houses basically fall into two types, though the distinction is rather blurred nowadays. A Kaffeehaus, which is traditionally preferred by men but enjoyed by everyone, offers games such as chess and billiards and serves wine, beer, spirits and light meals. A Cafe Konditorei attracts more women and typically has a salon look with rococo mouldings and painted glass. Aida is a particularly popular chain of Konditorei, a totally pink affair where you can discuss your latest operation or the neighbour's new driveway with the old ladies at the next table. A wide variety of cakes and pastries is usually on offer.

and in a similar vein:

The Aida chain is the McDonald's of the konditorei (coffee and cake shops) world—ubiquitous, uniform and garish. Instead, seek out more independent konditoreis, where you won't be surrounded by squabbling children. Or sink into the sanctuary of a true Viennese coffee house [...]

== See also ==
- List of restaurants in Vienna
