= List of restaurants in Vienna =

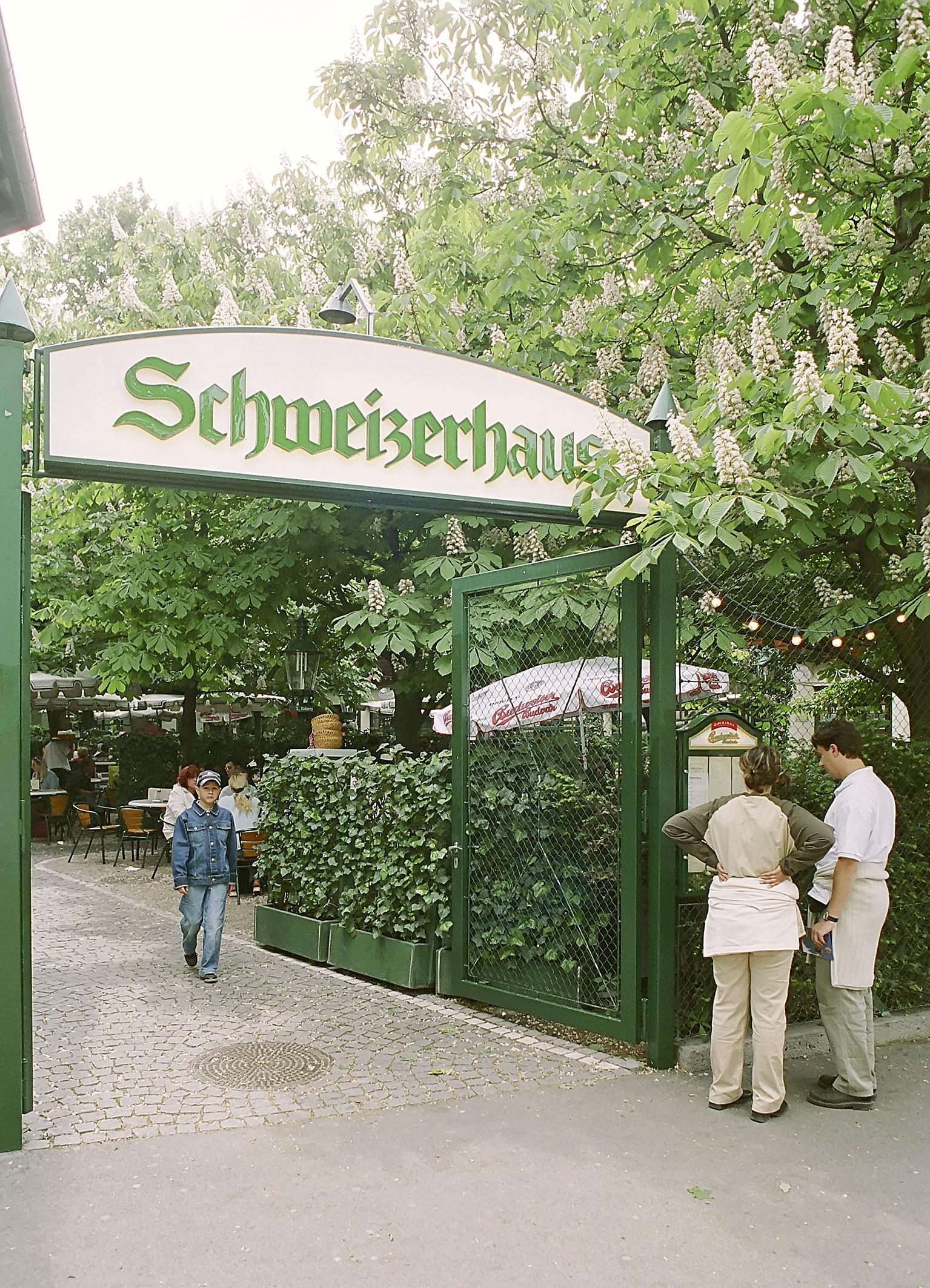
Schweizerhaus entrance

This is a list of notable restaurants in Vienna, Austria.

== Restaurants ==
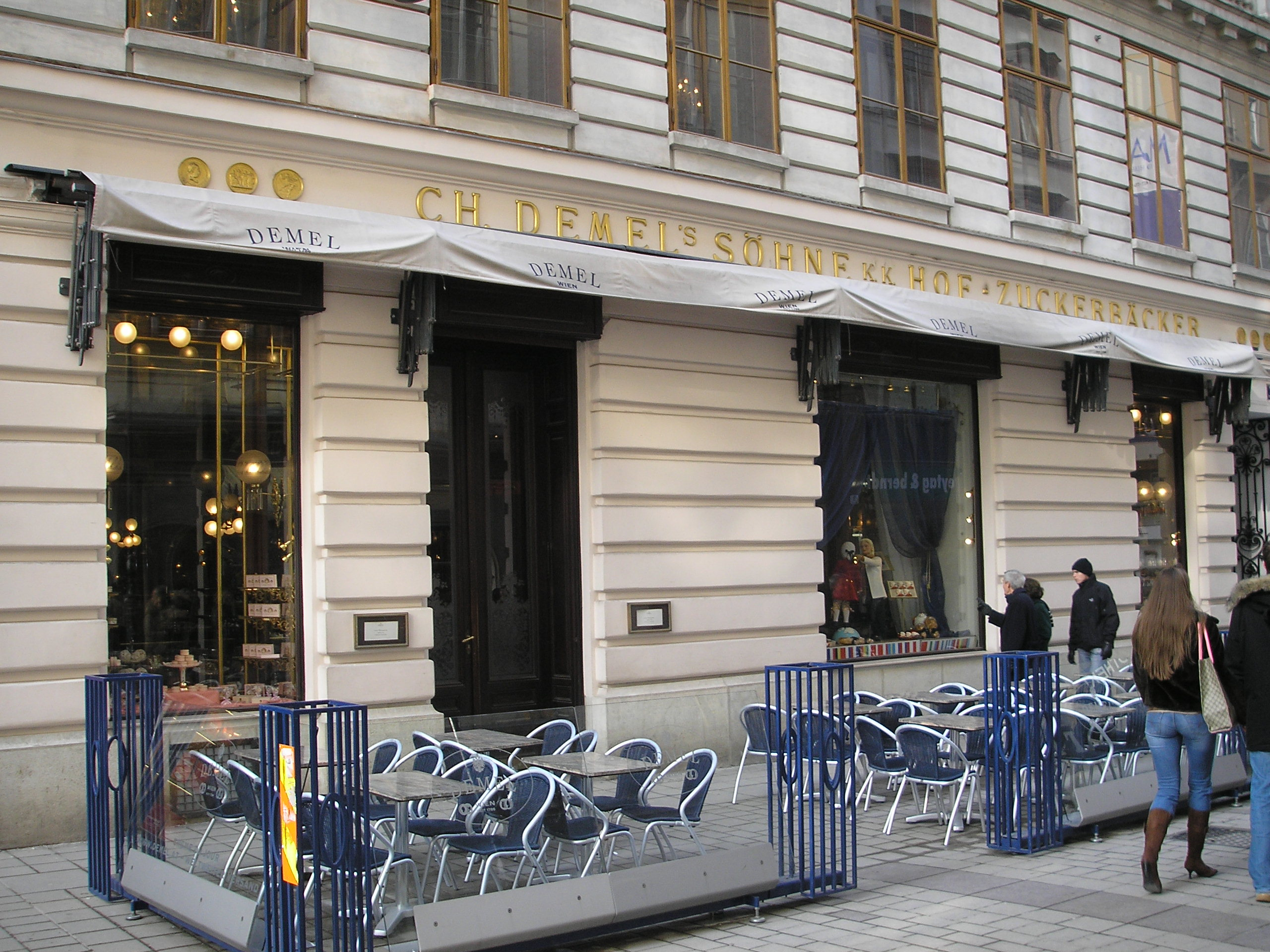
Exterior of Demel

- Altmann & Kühne – confiserie and chocolaterie established in 1928 in Vienna
- Demel – famous confectioner and Konditorei established in 1786 in Vienna
- Donauturm – prominent tower in Vienna with two revolving restaurants
- Griechenbeisl – oldest restaurant in Vienna, founded in 1447
- Palais Esterházy – baroque palace in Vienna that houses a famous and popular restaurant in the former wine cellars, called Esterházykeller
- Schweizerhaus – has a huge beer garden that is subdivided into smaller areas, each of which is named for a town district of Vienna

=== Cafés ===
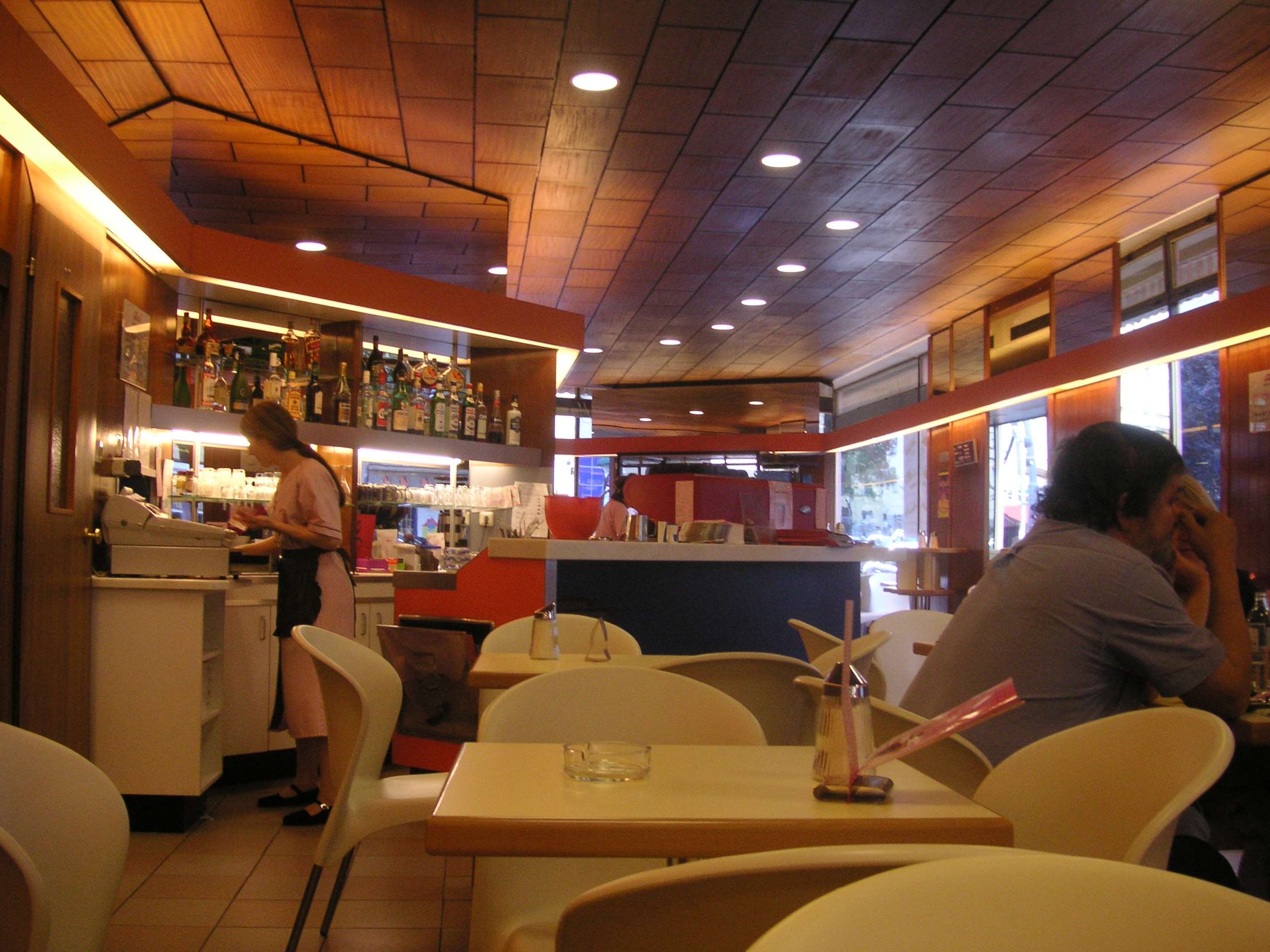
A view inside Aida

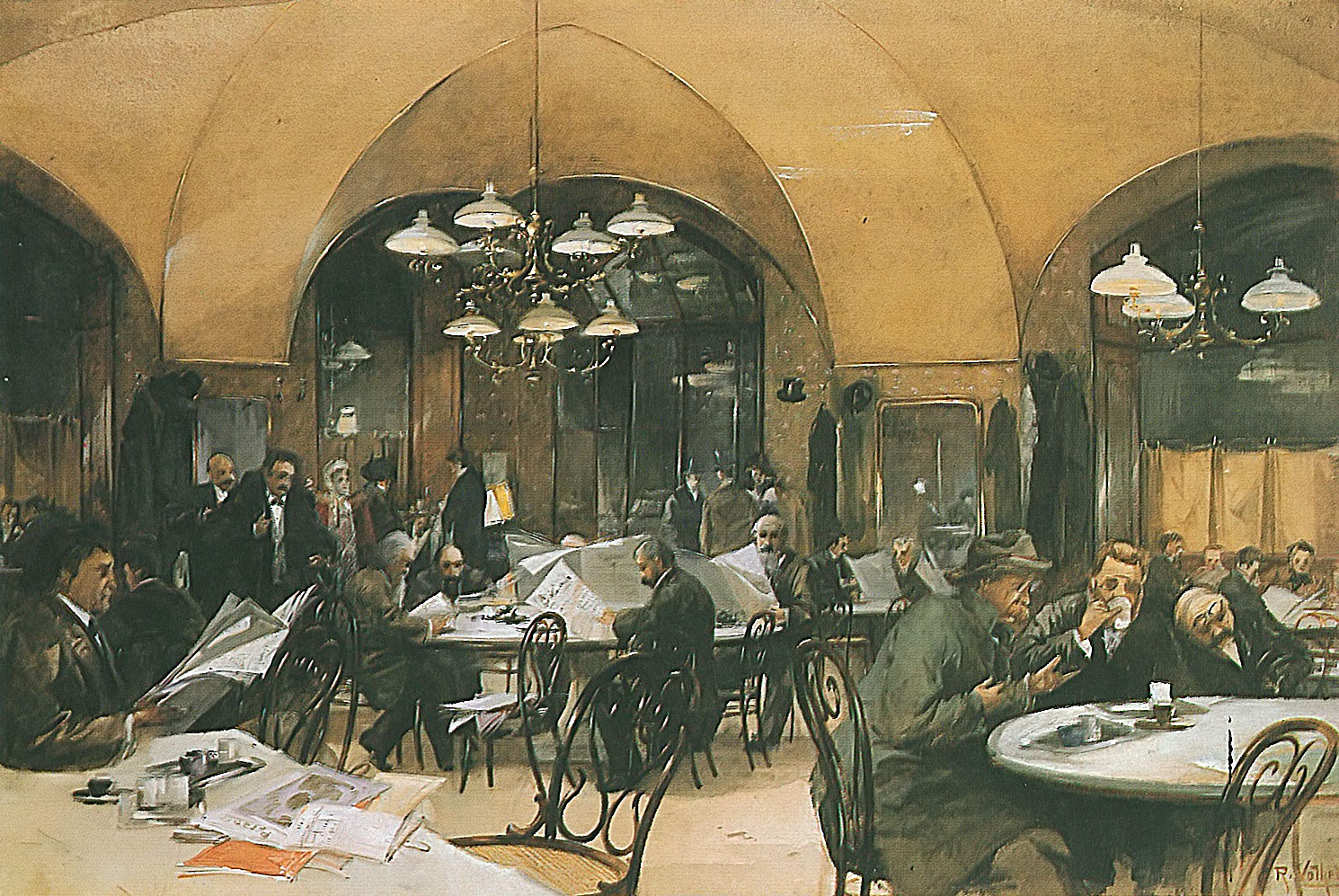
An 1896 painting of Café Griensteidl

The Viennese coffee house is a typical institution of Vienna that played an important part in shaping Viennese culture.

- Aida – Austrian regional chain of coffeehouses
- Blue Bottle Coffee House – Historical coffee house in Vienna, Austria
- Café Bräunerhof – Coffee house in Vienna
- Café Central – Coffee house in Vienna, Austria
- Café Griensteidl – Viennese café in Vienna, Austria
- Café Hawelka – Viennese café in Vienna, Austria
- Café Jelinek – Coffee house in Vienna
- Café Korb – Coffee house in Vienna
- Café Landtmann – Traditional Viennese café in Innere Stadt, Austria
- Café Museum – Viennese café in Vienna, Austria
- Café Restaurant Residenz – Classical Viennese coffee house in Austria
- Café Schwarzenberg – Viennese coffee house in Austria
- Café Sluka – Coffee house in Vienna
- Café Sperl – Viennese café in Vienna, Austria
- Kaffee Alt Wien – Café in Vienna
- Vollpension – Coffee house in Vienna, Austria

== See also ==
- List of Michelin-starred restaurants in Austria
- Lists of restaurants
- Schanigarten – Austro-Bavarian term for tables and chairs set up on the sidewalk in front of eating and drinking places
- Franciszek Trześniewski
- Würstelstand – traditional Austrian street food retail outlet selling hot dogs, sausages, and side dishes, they are a ubiquitous sight in Vienna
