= Herbert Tenzer =

American attorney and politician

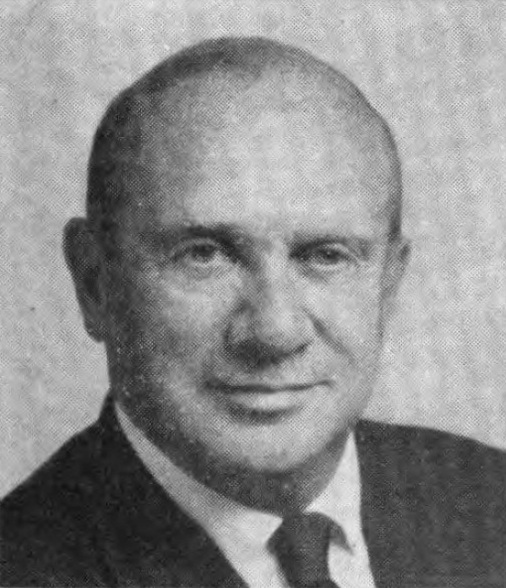

Member of the U.S. House of Representatives from New York's 5th district
- In office January 3, 1965 – January 3, 1969
- Preceded by: Frank J. Becker
- Succeeded by: Allard K. Lowenstein

Personal details
- Born: November 1, 1905 New York City, New York
- Died: March 24, 1993 (aged 87) Lawrence, New York
- Party: Democratic

Herbert Tenzer (November 1, 1905 – March 24, 1993) was an American Democratic Party politician, who served two terms in the United States House of Representatives from 1965 to 1968. Tenzer was also a lawyer and a philanthropist.

== Early life and education ==
Tenzer was born in New York City and attended the city's public schools. He graduated from Stuyvesant High School in 1923 and the New York University School of Law in 1927. He was admitted to the bar in 1929 and commenced the practice of law.

== Career ==
Tenzer was a senior partner in the firm of Tenzer Greenblatt Fallon & Kaplan, which he founded in 1937. From 1940 to 1960 he was chairman of the Barton's Candy Corporation.

He was elected as a Democrat to the Eighty-ninth and Ninetieth Congresses, serving from January 3, 1965 to January 3, 1969 as the Representative of New York's 5th congressional district. He did not run for reelection in 1968, and resumed the practice of law.

Tenzer was a founder of the Albert Einstein College of Medicine at Yeshiva University. He was a founder of the Benjamin N. Cardozo School of Law at Yeshiva University, served on the board of trustees, and held the posts of chairman and chairman emeritus. He was also active in founding Yeshiva's Sy Syms School of Business. Tenzer was also a board of directors member and board president for the National Council to Combat Blindness (NCCB) (now Fight for Sight). He was also a founder and past president of the United Jewish Appeal of Greater New York. After World War II, he headed Rescue Children Inc., which cared for Jewish children in Europe orphaned by the Holocaust.

From 1969 to 1983 Tenzer was chairman of the Nassau County board of ethics. In 1975 he served as vice chairman of New York State's special advisory committee on medical malpractice. From 1977 to 1983 he served as chairman of the New York State Board of Social Welfare. He was a resident of Lawrence, on Long Island, New York, until his death there on March 24, 1993. He was buried at Beth David Cemetery in Elmont, New York.

== Family ==
Tenzer and his wife, the former Florence Novor, had a daughter Diane and son Barry and nine grandchildren.

== See also ==
- List of Jewish members of the United States Congress

U.S. House of Representatives
Preceded by Frank J. Becker	Member of the U.S. House of Representatives from New York's 5th congressional district 1965–1969	Succeeded by Allard K. Lowenstein
