= Barton's Candy Corporation =

American Chocolatier and candy company

- Type: Private
- Industry: Confectionery
- Founded: 1946
- Founder: Stephen Klein
- Headquarters: New York City, United States
- Key people: Stephen Klein
- Products: Chocolate and other confections
- Website: bartonscandy.com

Barton's Candy Corporation was a Chocolatier and candy company founded in 1940 by Stephen Klein and his five brothers a year after they arrived in the United States from Austria. Its original name was Barton's Bonbonnieres, and as of 1960 operated 3,000 stores across America.

Few of their stores were in "specifically Jewish neighborhoods." All of their stores were closed on Saturday (Shomer Shabbos). In 1981 a controlling share of Barton's was acquired by another firm.

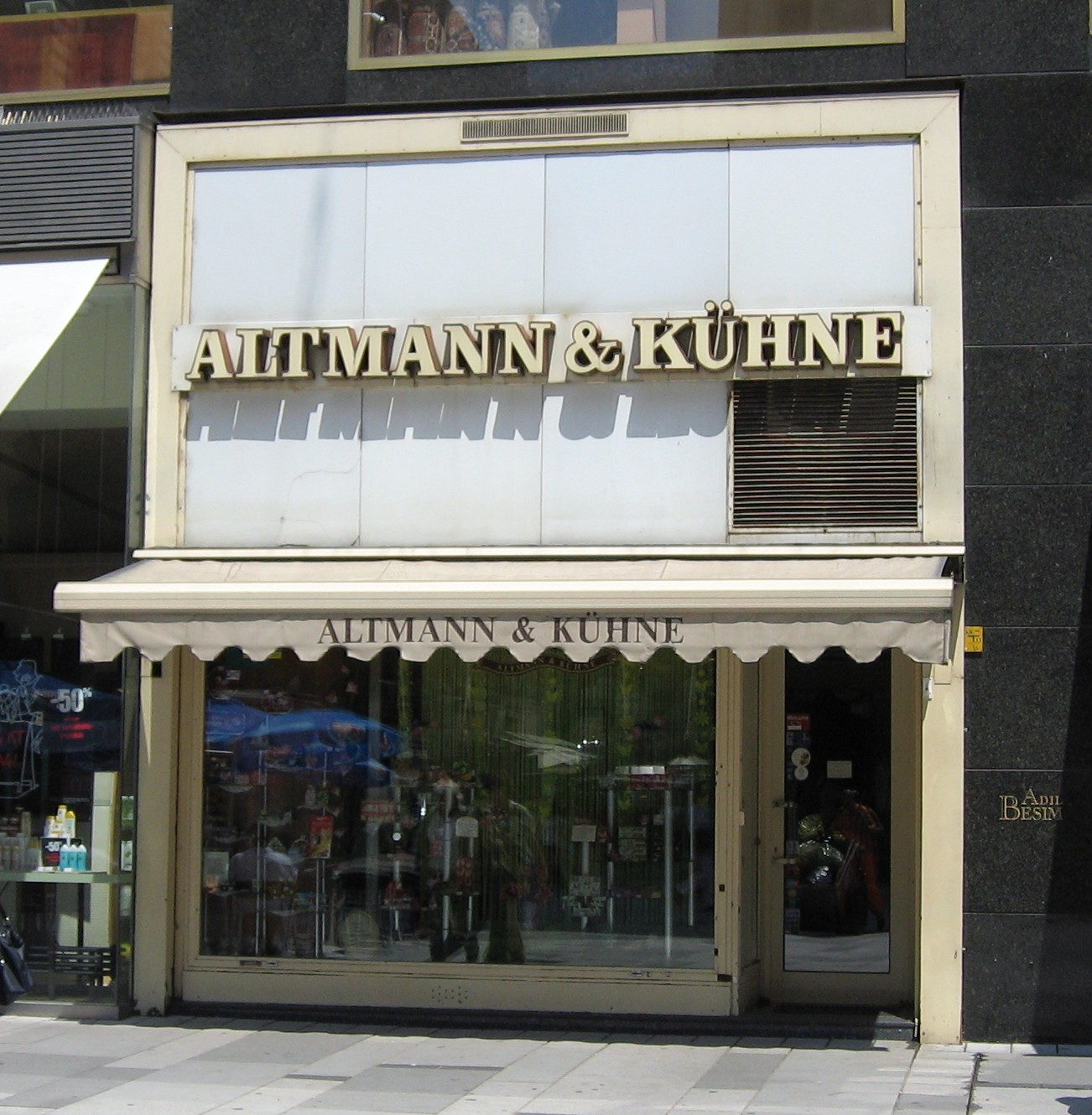
Altmann & Kühne outlet on the Graben, where Klein's family developed chocolate expertise. The facade was designed by Josef Hofmann.

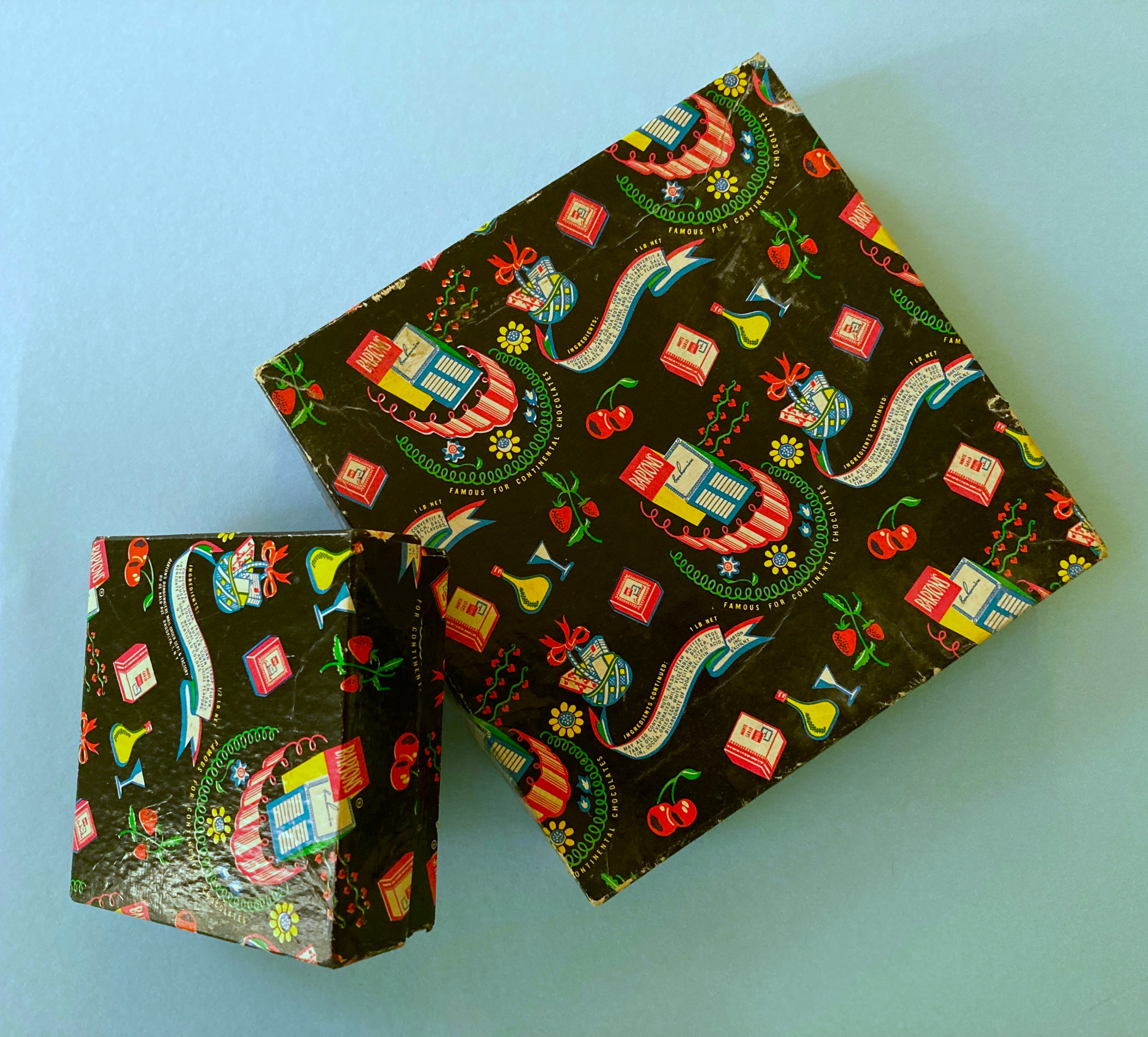
Barton's Chocolate Boxes from 1952. The design of these original boxes reminds the Altmann & Kühne wrapping design of the early 1930s.

In 2011, the entire company was purchased by Bazzini, an 1886-founded nut, fruit and chocolate company; a 2022 Jerusalem Post item wrote of "the now gone Barton's confectioners."

== "Centuries" ==
The Jewish Chronicle newspaper wrote about Barton's in 2021 and added with more enthusiasm than historical precision that "Jewish entrepreneurs had been involved in the chocolate trade for centuries." Klein's family developed some of its expertise in an Austrian company named Altmann & Kühne, much of which relocated from pre-World War II Europe to the United States. By 1952 they had seven stores in Detroit.

Part of the company's 1950s and 1960s growth was due to competitions in Jewish schools among classes, competing for prizes for selling the most Barton's products. "Generations of Jewish children sold Barton's candies as fundraisers," which was in part fueled by Klein's involvement with "philanthropic activities ... promoting Orthodox Jewish education."

It also helped that Barton's refused to water down the "mouth feel of chocolate" even as other companies were incorporating the use of synthetic ingredients in their products.

== Promotional Book of Esther scroll ==
A cylinder containing a 4.5 inch scroll 1953-copyrighted Megillas Esther was distributed "throughout the 1950s and 60s with the same copyright date" with the container saying:

- Book of Esther in English, Megilas Esther in Hebrew
- Happy Purim
- Barton’s Bonbonnieres. The top of the cylinder had the words "Famous for Continental Chocolate."

== Recall ==
The US Food and Drug Administration (FDA) praised the company's quick reaction in recalling about 4,000 two pound tins of fruitcakes when "a few samples" were found to have a problem; "most Barton's fruitcakes on the market were not contaminated."

== Kashrut ==
While all Barton's products are kosher, not all of them are kosher for passover: some of them have flour ingredients. The Orthodox Union certification covers chocolate and candy items that are Pareve and dairy chocolate; they also supervise kosher-for-passover offerings. A 2-part article noted that "even its Easter chocolates were kosher for Passover."

The Atlantic magazine wrote in 2009 that Barton's initially "rejected OU certification" but yielded when faced with competition from Barricini.

== Corporation ==
Former 2-term Congressman Herbert Tenzer was instrumental in helping the former Barton's Bonbonnieres expand, and served as chairman of the board of directors for two decades. Founder Stephen Klein's son George Klein became President/CEO in 1972.

The company founders' real estate interests and community involvement led to the company's pair of large buildings benefitting the City of New York's attempts to "emancipate Brooklyn from its commercial bondage to Manhattan."
