= Café Bräunerhof =

Café in Vienna, Austria

Coordinates: 48°12′26″N 16°22′7.5″E

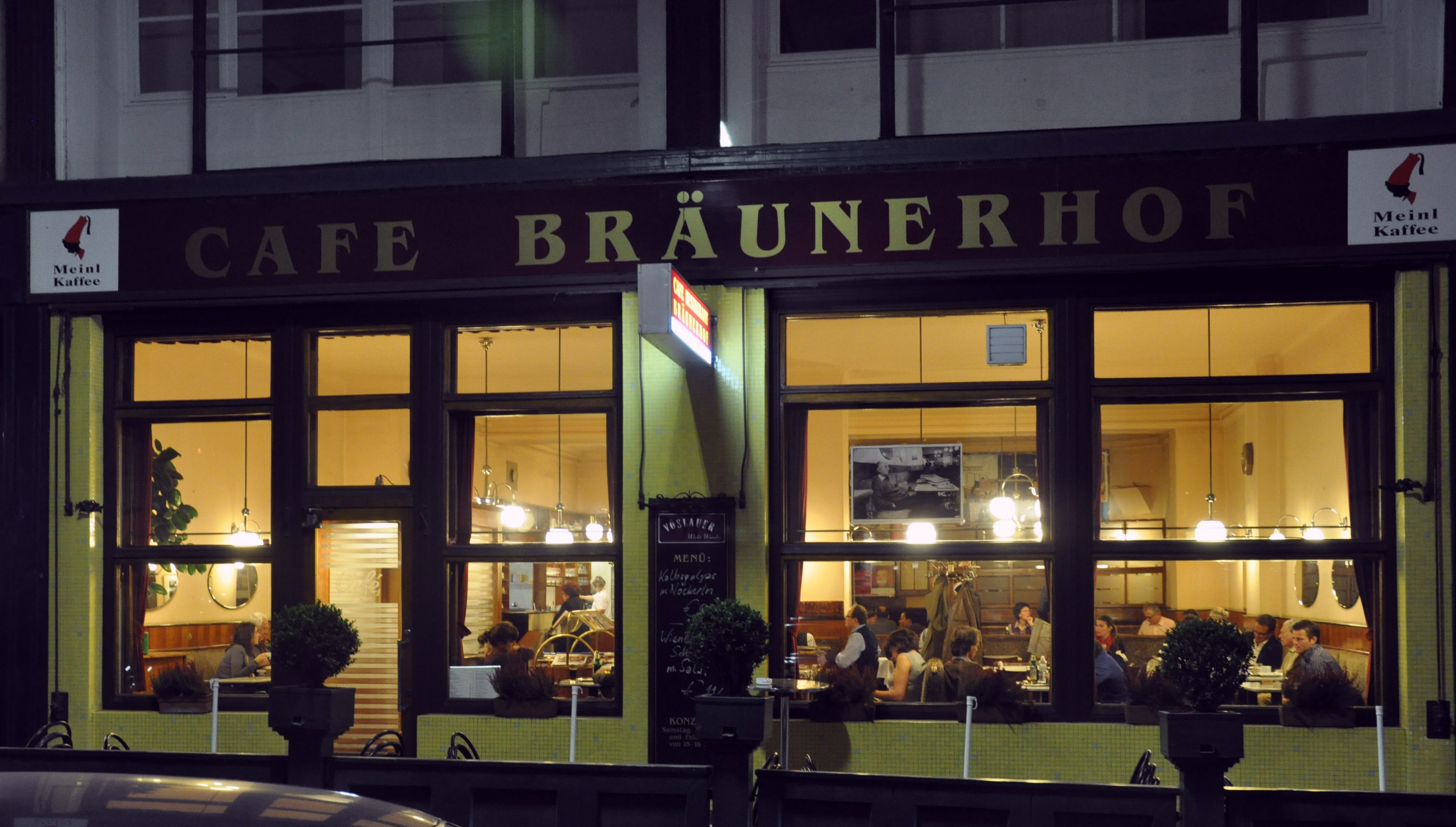
Café Bräunerhof in Vienna, Austria

Café Bräunerhof is a traditional Viennese café and restaurant located at Stallburggasse 2 in the Innere Stadt first district in Vienna, Austria. Bräunerhof is best known for being the preferred café of the famous Austrian writer Thomas Bernhard. Today there is a vitrine showing a picture of the author and pointing the direction to the café on a street corner nearby. Every Saturday there is live music at the café with a small orchestra playing waltzes and classical music. The restaurant was opened around 1920/1921 by Friedrich Bolberitz as Café Sans Souci. It was a meeting place for antique dealers in the area and also functioned as a dance café. Bolberitz had to leave Vienna in 1938, his successor changed the name of the house to "Bräunerhof" (this is named after Bräunerstrasse). Under the owner Siegfried Hosnik, the café was again frequented by artists and writers.

== See also ==
- List of restaurants in Vienna
