= Bazzini =

Oldest nut company in the United States

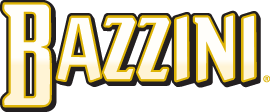
- Industry: Snack foods
- Founded: 1886 in New York City, New York, United States
- Founder: Anthony L. Bazzini
- Headquarters: Allentown, Pennsylvania
- Products: Nuts; Dried fruit; Chocolate
- Website: bazzininuts.com

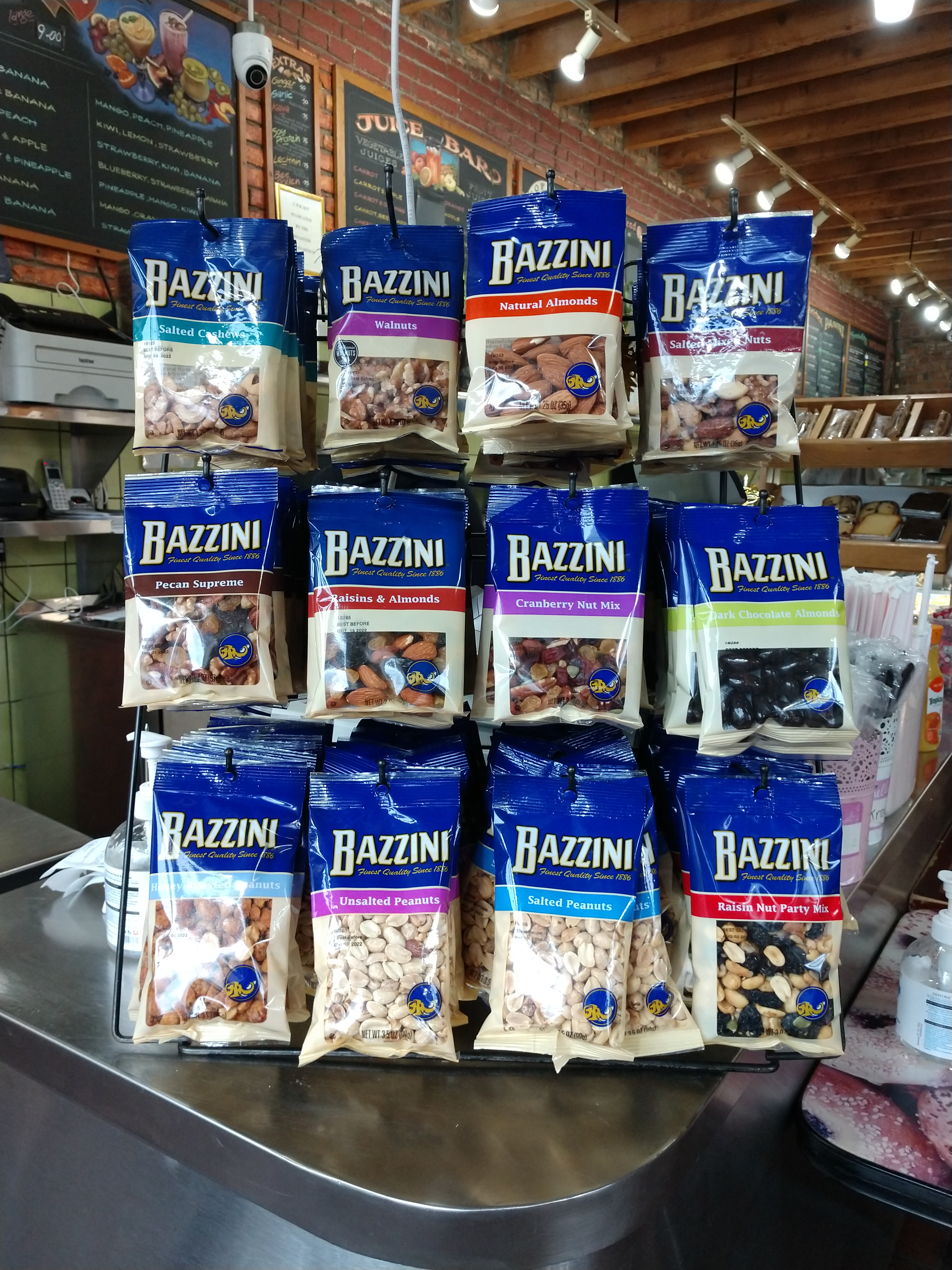
Bazzini products on display at a bagel shop in Brooklyn, New York

The A. L. Bazzini Company, commonly known as Bazzini, is an American nut, fruit, and chocolate company headquartered in Allentown, Pennsylvania. Founded in New York City in 1886, it is the oldest nut company in the United States. It began on Park Place in the Washington Market neighborhood of Manhattan. Upon the market's demolition in 1968, the company moved to a large nut-processing facility on Greenwich Street. In 1983, the Bazzini family sold the business to Rocco Damato, who has owned and operated it since. The company moved to the Bronx in 1997, and to Allentown in 2011. In addition to being sold through retail shops, its nuts are sold in venues like Yankee Stadium; it has supplied both the original and current stadiums of that name since the original opened in 1923. The company's former factory on Greenwich Street is still known as the Bazzini Building, although it has been turned in to condominiums, and is part of the Tribeca West Historic District.

== History ==
Anthony L. Bazzini, an Italian immigrant, started the A. L. Bazzini Company in 1886, selling nuts to businesses and individuals. It was based on Park Place in Manhattan until 1968, when the Washington Market was demolished amid urban renewal programs. Most other food wholesalers moved up to the Bronx, but Bazzini already owned a six-story brick building at nearby 339 Greenwich Street, so the company relocated operations there.

As of 1976, the company processed 3,000 tons (2,700,000 kg) of peanuts out of the New York facility. The nuts came from Virginia, North Carolina, and Georgia to be roasted in the shell or shelled, blanched, and either oil- or dry-roasted. It also processed Brazil nuts, cashews, pine nuts, pumpkin seeds, walnuts, and pecans.

The company has had arrangements with large venues in New York, like Madison Square Garden, Shea Stadium, and Yankee Stadium. It supplied the original Yankee Stadium for its entire existence from 1923 to 2008, and continues to supply the current Yankee Stadium as of 2017. It also distributed to a number of retail shops like Zabar's.

The New York Times wrote an article about how Bazzini, which it called "one of the largest packers and distributors of nuts in America", benefitted from press coverage about Jimmy Carter. Carter was campaigning to be president of the United States at the time, and often highlighted his background as a peanut farmer.

Rocco Damato and partners bought the company from the Bazzini family in 1983, with Damato as CEO. In the 1980s, due to the increased expense of operating in Manhattan, the company sold some space in the Greenwich Street building to condominium developers, but retained the retail space on the first floor. Damato and his wife, Electra Damato, operated the nut store which had been there since the company moved in, and expanded it to include gourmet food and a cafe. They transferred some production to North Carolina before deciding to completely relocate. In 1997, Bazzini relocated its main nut-processing facility from Tribeca to Hunts Point in the Bronx, maintaining the retail store on Greenwich Street. It was one of the last food companies left in a neighborhood that had been known for wholesale food manufacturing.

In 2011, Bazzini acquired Barton's Candy Company, a chocolatier and candy company founded in 1940. That same year Bazzini's factory moved again, this time to Allentown, Pennsylvania. Damato attributed the decision to the passage of the Food Safety Modernization Act, a law which gives the Food and Drug Administration new authorities to regulate the way foods are grown, harvested and processed. He said it would require tens of millions of dollars in upgrades to the Bronx facility to meet the new regulations. They opted to move to Allentown instead, where it already owned a more modern facility since its purchase of Barton's. In 2012, the company was fined by the Occupational Safety and Health Administration for a pattern of workplace safety and health violations at the Allentown factory.

The company's trademark is a happy elephant holding a big peanut. Though its headquarters moved to Allentown, it retained offices and distribution in the Bronx in New York City. As of 2017, it is the oldest nut company in the United States and Damato continues as CEO. In addition to nuts, it sells nut butters, dried fruit, chocolate, and other snacks and confections.

== Bazzini Building ==
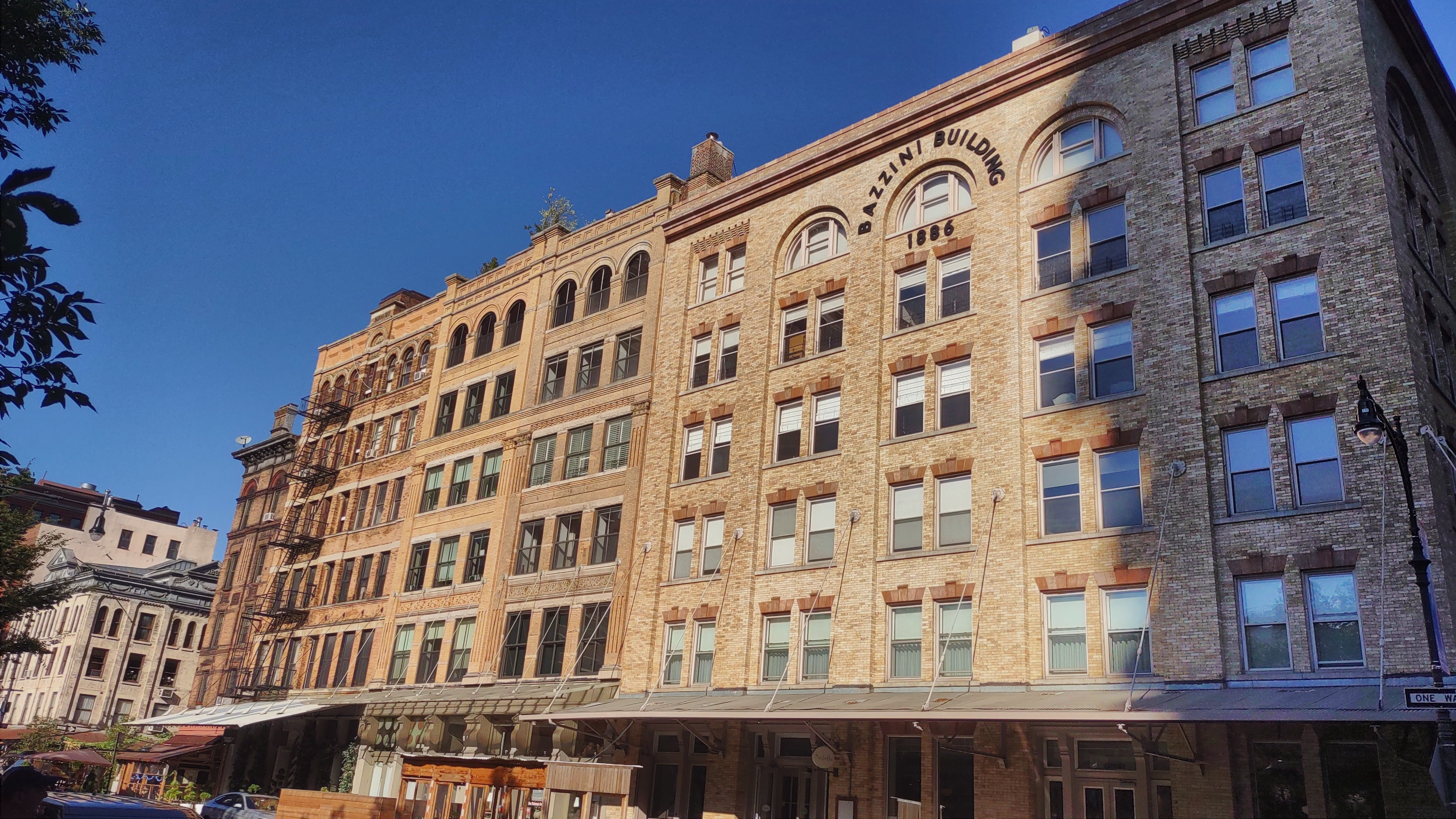
The Bazzini Building in September 2021

The large nut-processing building which operated at 339 Greenwich Street, at the intersection with Jay Street, is still known as the Bazzini Building.

It was initially built for John H. Mohlmann, who owned a successful grocery business which operated in the Washington Market neighborhood and purchased several buildings in the area. After he died, his estate combined four lots to construct a large, six-story building. It was designed by C. Wilson Atkins in the Renaissance and Romanesque Revival styles. The Greenwich Street side is slightly taller, but the Jay Street facade has larger arches.

The Mohlmann family operated a wholesale grocery out of part of the space, while other businesses leased the rest. A large number of businesses, mostly food wholesalers, operated out of the building in the first half of the 20th century. Bazzini purchased it, along with adjacent buildings, in 1943, even while maintaining their business operations in Park Place and continuing to rent out to others. When their business was forced out of Park Place, they moved to Greenwich Street.

Though Bazzini left Tribeca in 1997, the large nut-processing building remains, converted into condominiums. It is part of the Tribeca West Historic District, designated May 7, 1991. The Damatos' retail store in the former Bazzini building closed in 2010.
