= Altmann & Kühne =

Austrian confiserie and chocolaterie

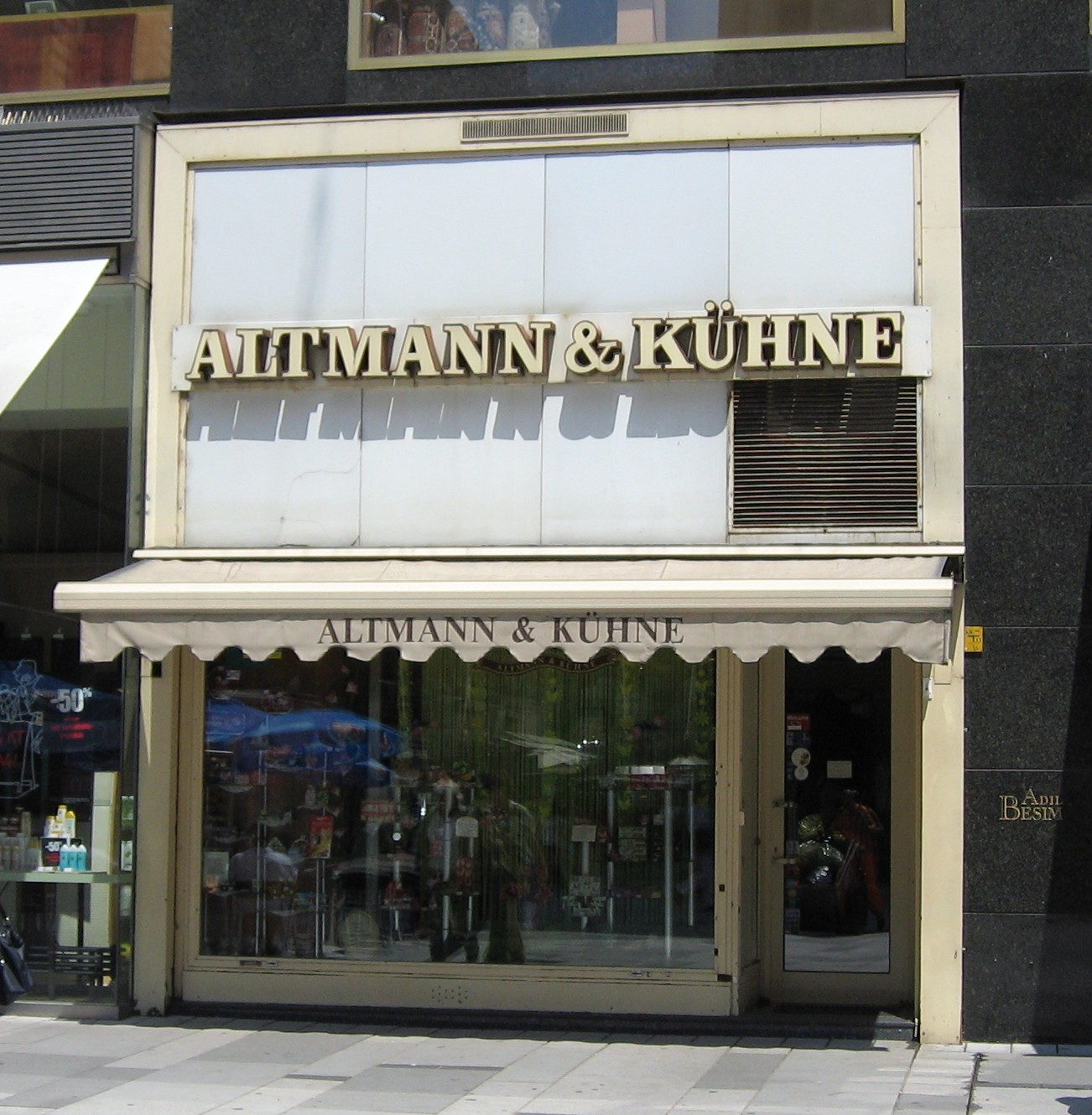
Altmann & Kühne outlet on the Graben. The facade designed by Josef Hofmann.

Altmann & Kühne is a confiserie and chocolaterie in Vienna, Austria, established in 1928. It produces handmade chocolates and bonbons with a special packaging designed by Wiener Werkstätte. It is located in the Innere Stadt, at Graben 30.

== In Vienna ==
The business, which advertised itself as a supplier to the former Imperial Court, successfully grew during the interwar period. It expanded to three downtown locations. The flagship store on the Graben featured a novel modernist facade designed by Josef Hofmann. It survived to date and is a listed building. Inside the store, the chocolates packages featured modernist designs by the artists of Wiener Werkstätte school.

By the time of the Anschluss of 1938, Altmann and Kühne was Vienna's fourth chocolatier - a "smaller but upscale producer" trailing after the "big three" of Victor Schmidt, Heller and Küfferle. After the Nazi takeover Emile Altmann and Ernst Kühne, who were Jewish, fled to New York City. The business survived through the Nazi years and World War II owing to the persistence of their employee, Mrs. Mercek.

== In the United States ==
A chocolatier outlet at 700 Fifth Avenue was established in December 1939. In 1941 it was sold to an American investor and continued operating under the Austrian brand until 1958. The New York Times regularly listed Altmann and Kuhne chocolates on its Easter shopping lists. Betsy Wade of The New York Times recounted in 1987: "... those chocolates in European-looking packages: the coffee beans for the adults - in theory at least - and the cats' tongues, finger-length spatulas of bittersweet, for me and my sister." After Altmann and Kühne left the New York stage, their Fifth Avenue store was rebranded Blum's and continued selling chocolates "perhaps among the finest made in this country".

Another group of former Altmann and Kühne employees who emigrated to the United States in 1938, founded the Barton's Candy Corporation, selling Continental Chocolates brand modelled after original Altmann and Kühne products. This American business eventually expanded into a chain of three thousand outlets.

== See also ==
- List of restaurants in Vienna

== Bibliography ==
- Bedford, Neil (September 1, 2004). Vienna City Guide. Lonely Planet. p. 162. ISBN 354063293X.
- Szogyi, Alex (December 30, 1997). Chocolate: Food for the Gods. Greenwood Press. p. 193. ISBN 0-313-30506-4.
