= Staatz =

- Municipality
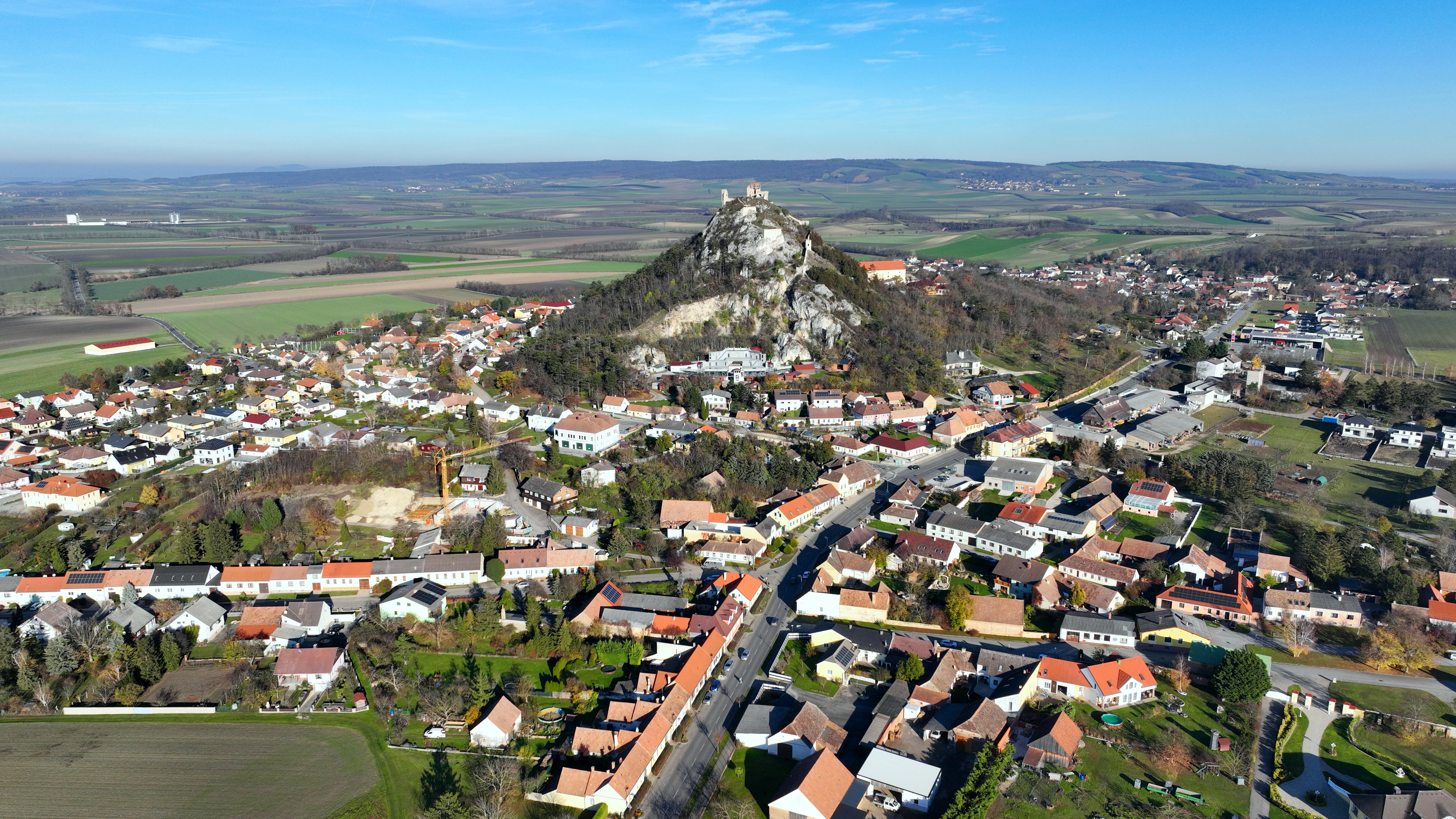

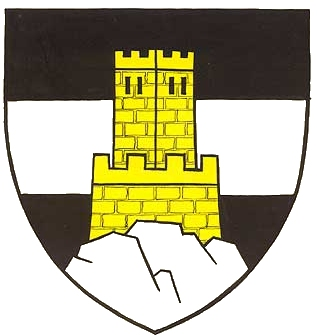
- Coat of arms

- Location within Austria
- Coordinates: 48°40′N 16°29′E
- Country: Austria
- State: Lower Austria
- District: Mistelbach

Government
  - Mayor: Leopold Muck

Area
  - Total: 42.64 km^{2} (16.46 sq mi)
- Elevation: 246 m (807 ft)

Population (2018-01-01)
  - Total: 1,933
  - Density: 45.33/km^{2} (117.4/sq mi)
- Time zone: UTC+1 (CET)
  - Summer (DST): UTC+2 (CEST)
- Postal code: 2141
- Area code: 02524
- Website: www.staatz.at

Staatz is a town in the district of Mistelbach in the Austrian state of Lower Austria.

== Population ==
Historical population
| Year | Pop. | ±% |
|---|---|---|
| 1971 | 2,125 | — |
| 1981 | 2,059 | −3.1% |
| 1991 | 2,012 | −2.3% |
| 2001 | 2,065 | +2.6% |
