= Wiener Melange =

Specialty coffee drink similar to cappuccino

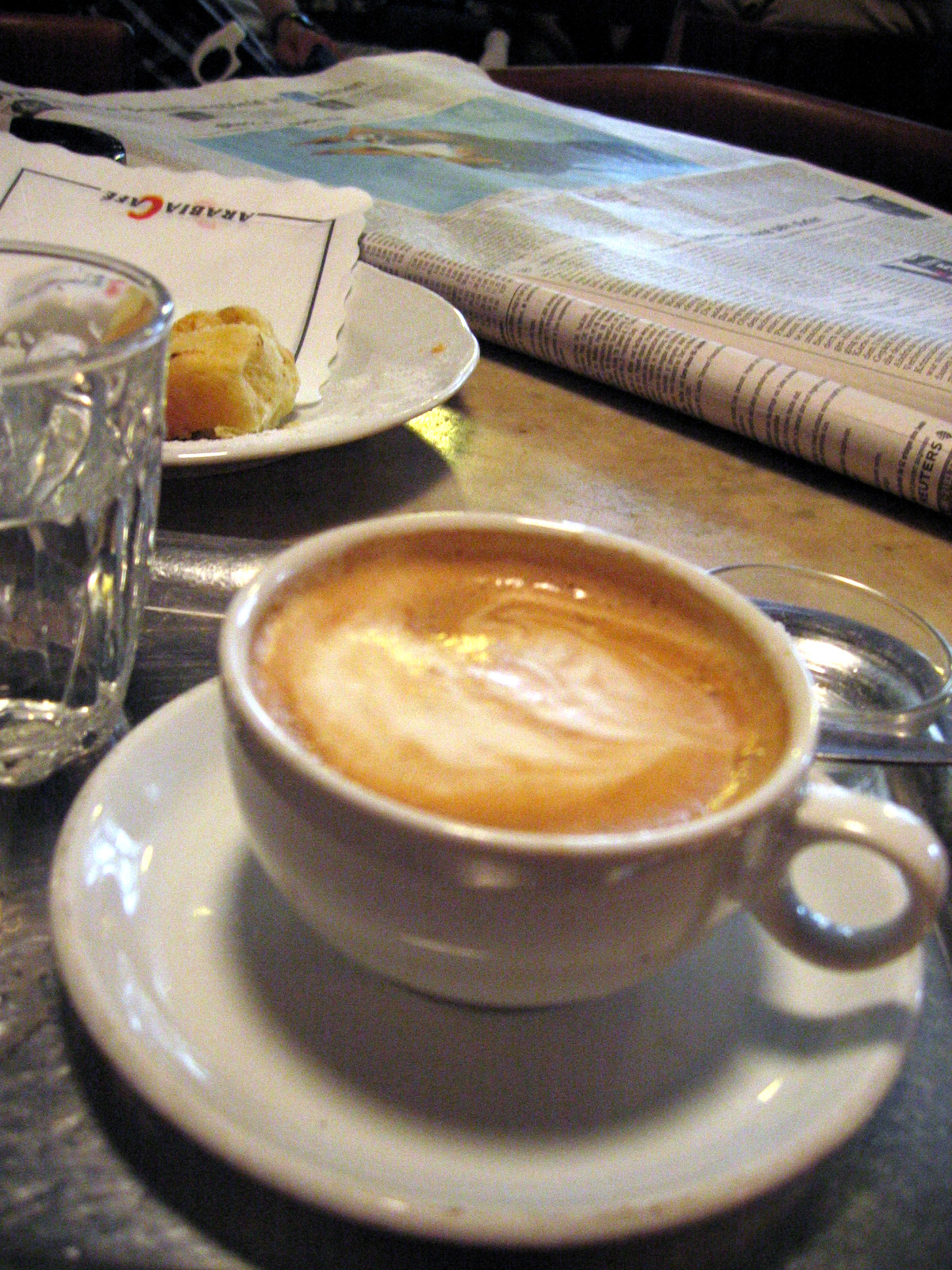
A Wiener Melange

A Melange (or Wiener Melange - "Vienna blend") is a specialty coffee drink similar to a cappuccino. The difference is that the Melange is made with milder coffee. At Cafe Sperl in Vienna, the Melange is half a cup of brewed coffee with half a cup of steamed cream, topped with milk foam. Nescafe, Mövenpick and Lufthansa Catering however serve Wiener Melange as coffee blended with cocoa – no matter whether foam topped or not.

The English term "Cafe Vienna" and the French café viennois usually refer to espresso con panna – topped with whipped cream instead of milk foam. Ordering a Wiener Melange may yield the arrival of an espresso con panna even in Vienna, though this is properly called a Franziskaner (Franciscan friar). The reference to Franciscan friars parallels the term "cappuccino", similar to the Austrian coffee preparation or "Kapuziner", which derives its name from the brown color of the robes worn by Capuchin friars.

== See also ==
- List of coffee beverages
- Wiener coffee
