= Café Sperl =

Viennese café in Vienna, Austria

Coordinates: 48°11′59″N 16°21′39″E

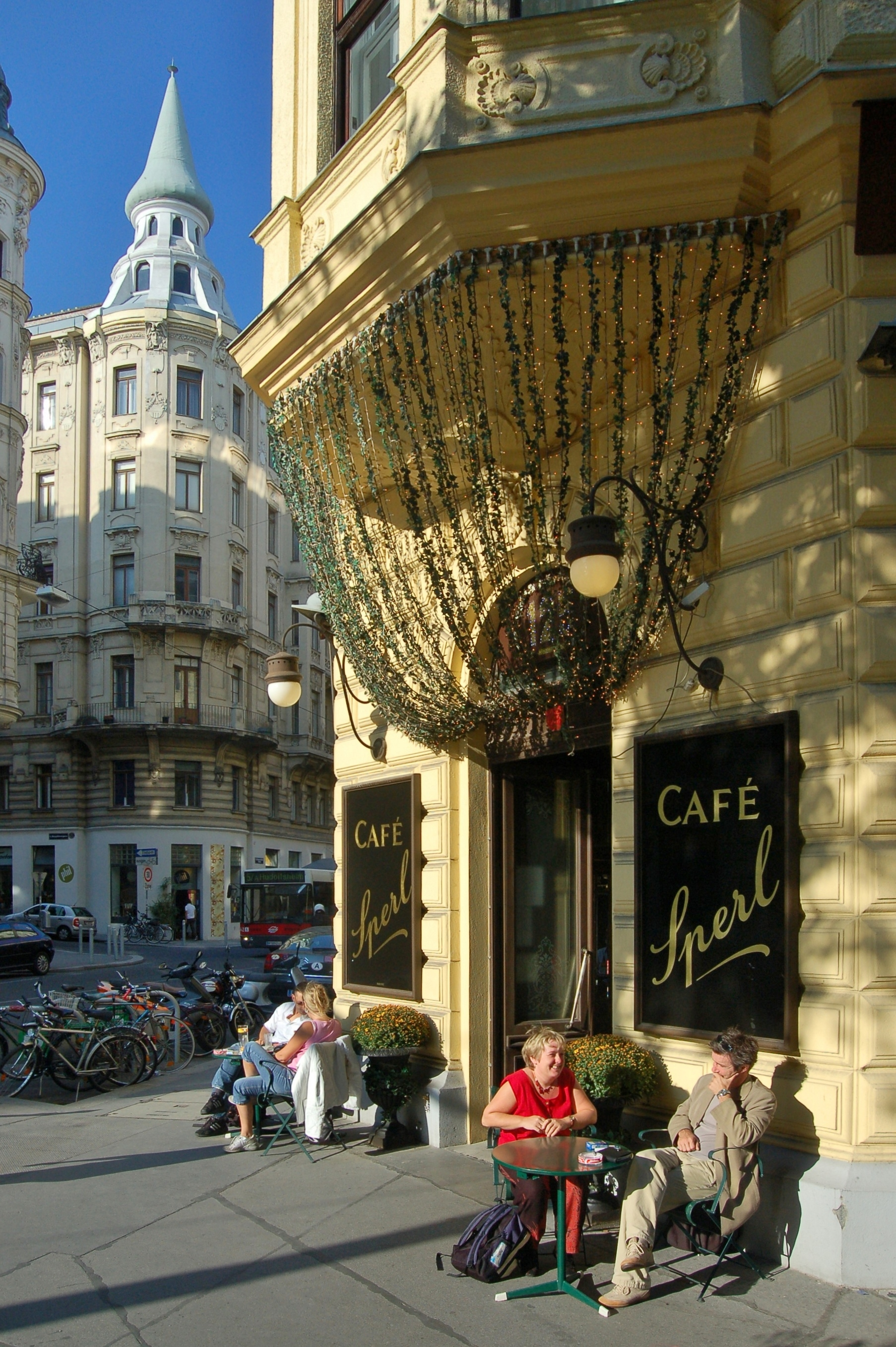
Café Sperl on Gumpendorfer Straße in Vienna, Austria

Café Sperl is a traditional Viennese café located at Gumpendorfer Straße 11 in the Mariahilf sixth district of Vienna, Austria. The café is on the Austrian Register of Historic Places.

== History ==
Jacob Ronacher founded the cafe as Café Ronacher in 1880, in a building on the corner of Gumpendorfer Straße and the Lehargasse (Lehar Lane). The decor is reminiscent of Vienna's elegant Ringstraßen-Cafés with parquet floors, bentwood Thonet chairs, marble tables, crystal chandeliers and carambole billiards tables. The building and interior decor were designed by architects Wilhelm Jelinek and Anton Groß. Within the first year of operation, Ronacher sold the establishment to the Sperl family, who renamed the business Café Sperl. In 1884 ownership passed to Adolf Kratochwilla, who retained the cafe's name.

Prior to World War I, the primary clientele was an interesting mix of individuals drawn from Vienna's cultural and military circles. In addition to authors, artists, architects, composers, musicians and actors, military officials from the nearby Imperial and Royal (K.u.K) military academy could be found in attendance, including the future Chief of Staff of the Austro-Hungarian Army Franz Conrad von Hötzendorf and Archduke Joseph Ferdinand.

This infamous kaffeehauser is near the Vienna Academy of Fine Arts (Akademia der bildenden Künste) where Adolf Hitler of Café Sperl’s regulars applied to be a student, twice, and was rejected, twice. The failed artist was known to loudly subject patrons to his political opinions and eventually left his native Austria as a nobody and returned to Vienna in 1938 as head of the Nazi Party.

In 1968 Manfred Staub bought the cafe from the Kratochwillas. He renovated the cafe in 1983. In recent years, the Cafe Sperl has won several awards. These include the "Austrian Cafe of the Year," 1998 (German: Österreichisches Kaffeehaus des Jahres) and the Goldene Kaffeebohne (English: Golden Coffee Bean) in 2004. Contemporary cafe regulars have included authors Jörg Mauthe, Robert Menasse, Ana Tajder, and Michael Köhlmeier.

== In popular media ==
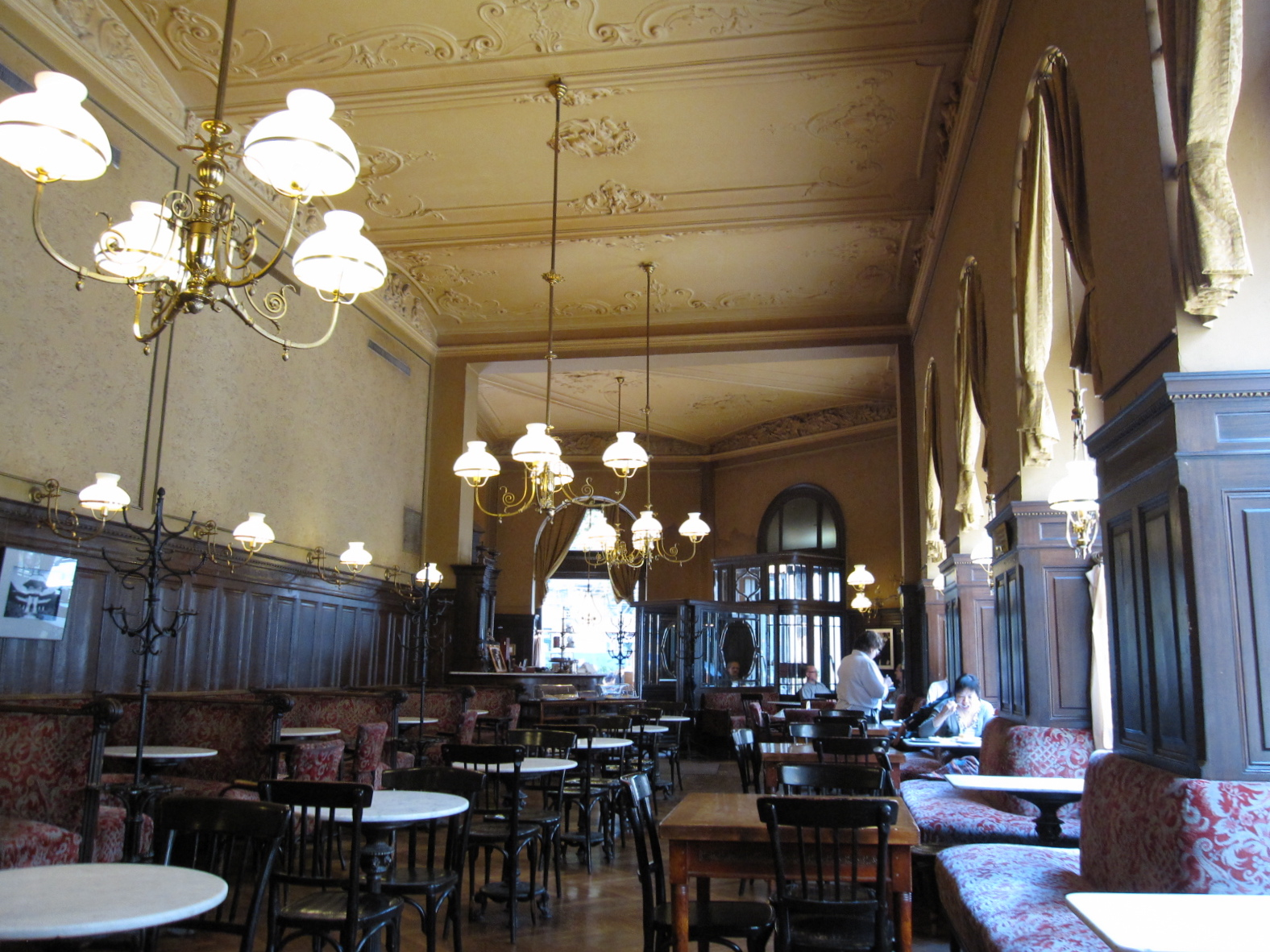
Café Sperl interior

Café Sperl was featured in the 1995 movie Before Sunrise, starring Ethan Hawke and Julie Delpy, and in a 2011 DVD of the Vienna Philharmonic playing the music of Johann Strauss, Fritz Kreisler and others. The café interior also appeared in the 2011 movie A Dangerous Method, which featured Viggo Mortensen and Michael Fassbender. The interior and exterior appear in the miniseries The Winds of War.

== See also ==
- List of restaurants in Vienna
