= Dorotheergasse =

Street in Vienna, Austria

Coordinates: 48°12′31″N 16°22′09″E

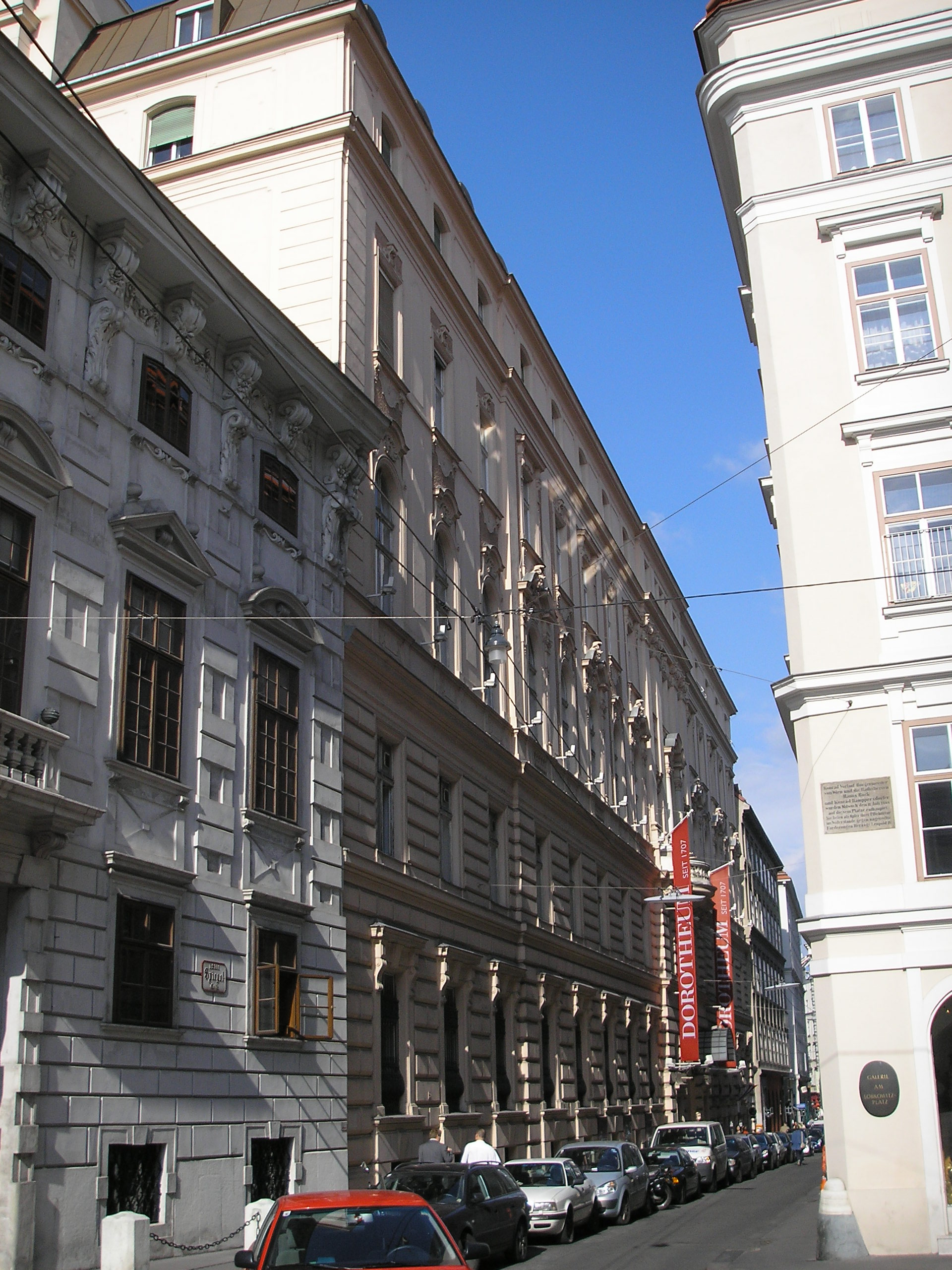
- The Palais Dorotheum in Dorotheergasse, taken October, 2006
- Former name(s): Färberstraße
- Part of: The Graben
- Namesake: Dorotheerkloster
- Location: Vienna

Dorotheergasse is a narrow lane (German: -gasse), terminating at the Graben to the north and Augustinerstraße to the south, part of the Old Town district of Vienna, Austria. It is named for the monastery of St. Dorothea, Dorotheerkloster.

Dorotheergasse is home to Dorotheum, one of the world's oldest auction houses. The Jewish Museum Vienna is also located in Dorotheergasse.
