= Szeps =

Szeps is a surname. Notable people with the surname include:

- Berta Zuckerkandl (born Bertha Szeps; 1864–1945), Austrian writer, journalist and art critic
- Henri Szeps (1943–2025), Australian actor
- Josh Szeps (born 1977), Australian media personality
- Moritz Szeps (1835–1902), Austrian newspaper tycoon, father of Berta
