= Berta Zuckerkandl =

Austrian writer, journalist and art critic

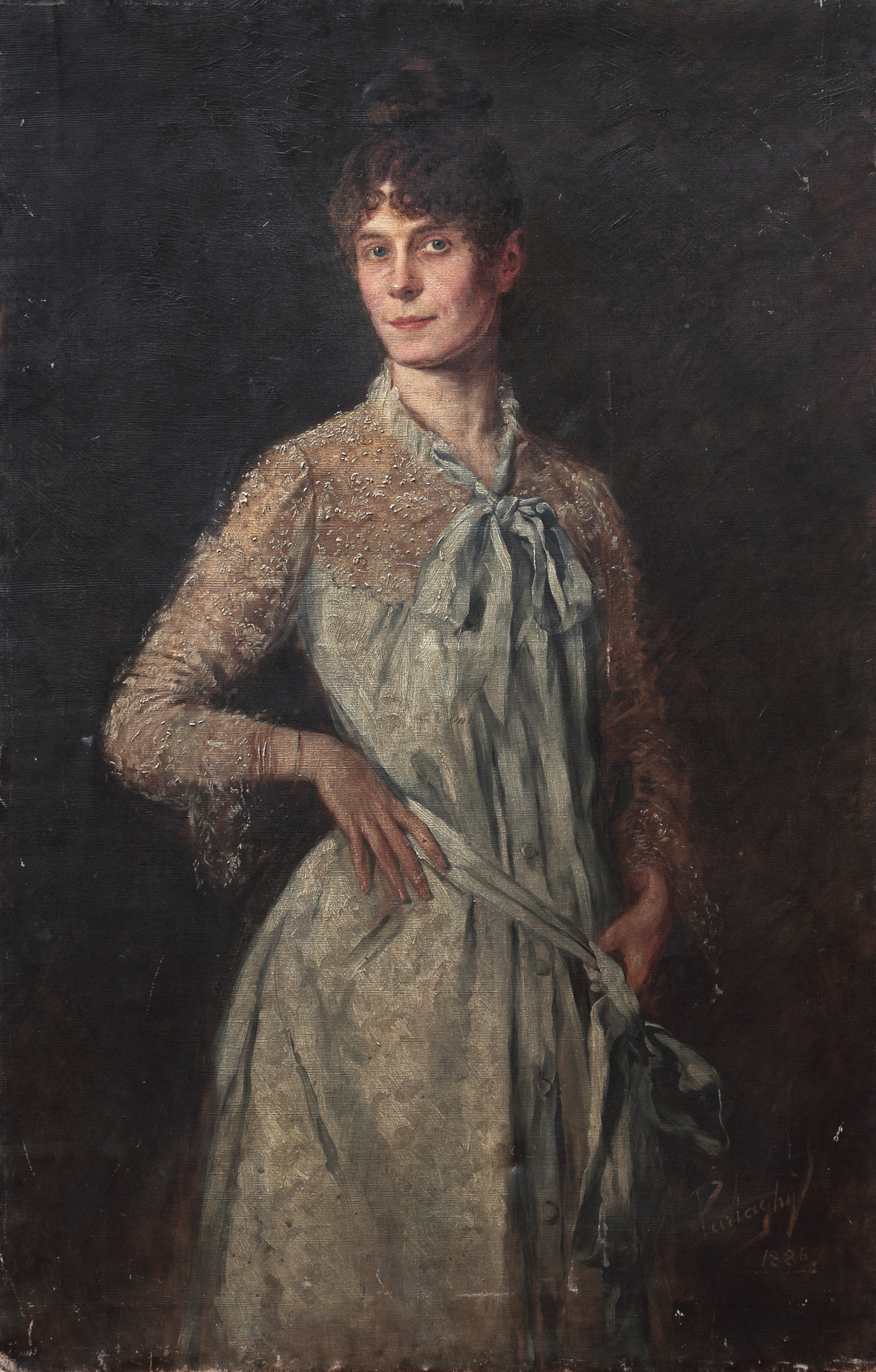
- Bertha Zuckerkandl (Vilma Lwoff-Parlaghy, 1886)
- Born: Berta Zuckerkandl-Szeps; 13 February 1864
- Died: 16 October 1945 (aged 81)
- Spouse: Emil Zuckerkandl
- Relatives: Moritz Szeps (father)
- Writing career
- Language: Austrian

Berta Zuckerkandl-Szeps (born Bertha Szeps; 13 April 1864 – 16 October 1945) was an Austrian writer, journalist and art critic.

Bertha Szeps was the daughter of Galician Jewish liberal newspaper publisher Moritz Szeps and grew up in Vienna. She was married to the Hungarian anatomist Emil Zuckerkandl.

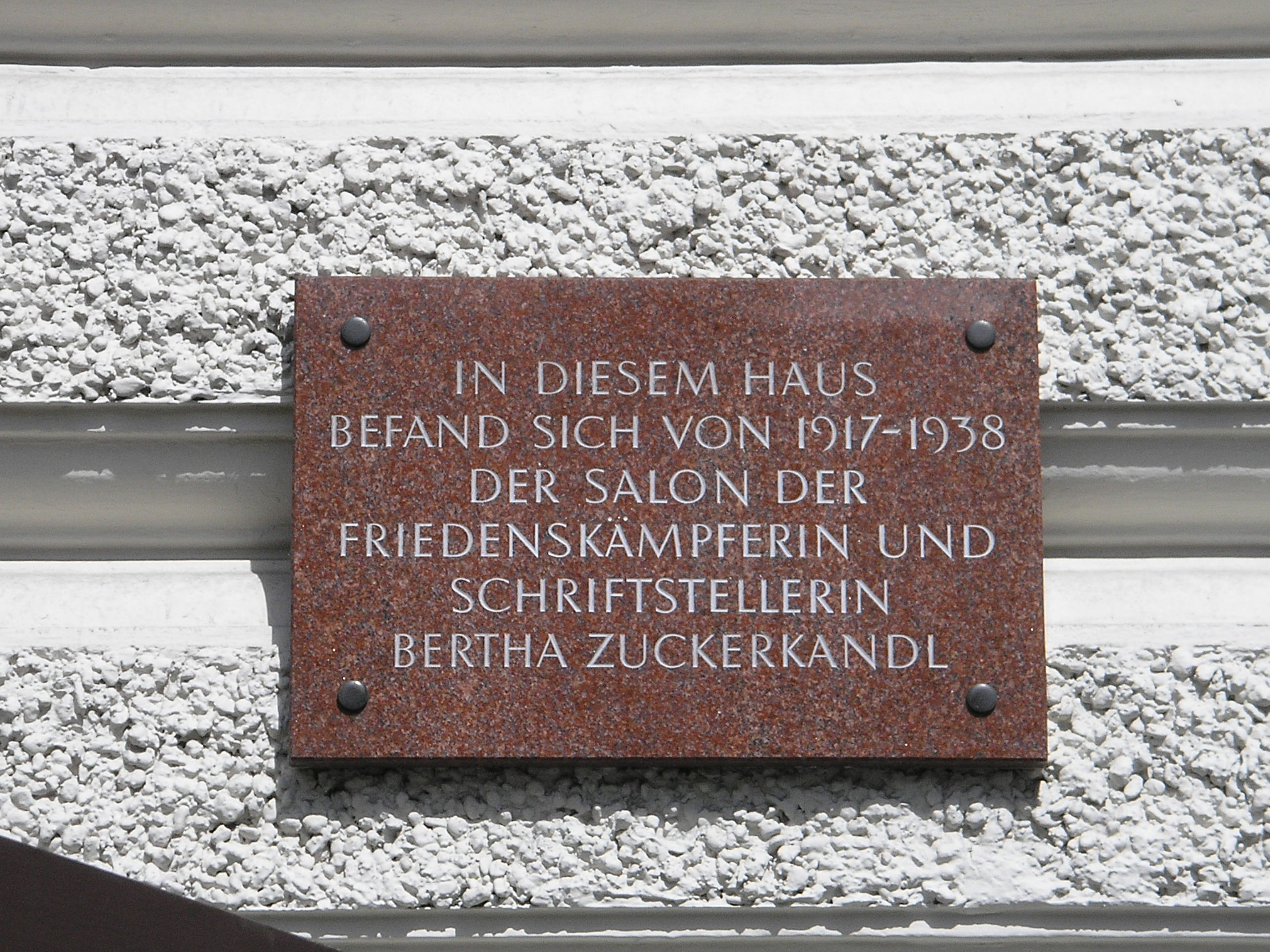
Plaque commemorating Zuckerkandl's salon, Palais Lieben-Auspitz, Vienna

In 1886 she married Zuckerkandl, who was then University of Graz professor of medicine. In 1888 the couple moved to Vienna, where he had obtained a professorship. From 1888 until 1938, Zuckerkandl led a major literary salon in Vienna, an informal weekly get-together, originally from a villa in Nußwaldgasse, Döbling, later in the Oppolzergasse near the Burgtheater. Many famous Viennese artists and personalities, including Gustav Klimt, Gustav Mahler, Hugo von Hofmannsthal, Max Reinhardt, Arthur Schnitzler Stefan Zweig, Egon Friedell and others, such as French sculptor Auguste Rodin when in Vienna, frequented the salon. Protégés of the salon included Anton Kolig and Sebastian Isepp of the Nötsch Circle. Her sister Sophie (1862–1937) was married to Paul Clemenceau, brother of French President Georges Clemenceau, which meant that she also had strong ties with Parisian artistic circles. She translated a number of plays from French to German and was a co-founder of the Salzburg Music Festival.

Due to Anschluss in 1938, she was forced to emigrate: first to Paris and later to Algiers. She returned to Paris in 1945 and died there that same autumn. She is buried at the Père Lachaise Cemetery.

== Works ==
- My life and History. Alfred A. Knopf. New York, 1939. Translated by John Sommerfield
- Die Pflege der Kunst in Österreich 1848–1898.
- Dekorative Kunst und Kunstgewerbe. Wien, 1900
- Zeitkunst Wien 1901–1907. Hugo Heller, Wien, 1908
- Ich erlebte 50 Jahre Weltgeschichte. Bermann-Fischer Verlag, Stockholm, 1939
- Clemenceau tel que je l'ai connu. Algier, 1944
- Österreich intim. Erinnerungen 1892–1942. Propyläen, Frankfurt/Main, 1970 (paperback edition: Ullstein, Frankfurt am Main, 1988; ISBN 3-548-20985-8)

== See also ==
- Salon of Berta Zuckerkandl
