= Salon of Berta Zuckerkandl =

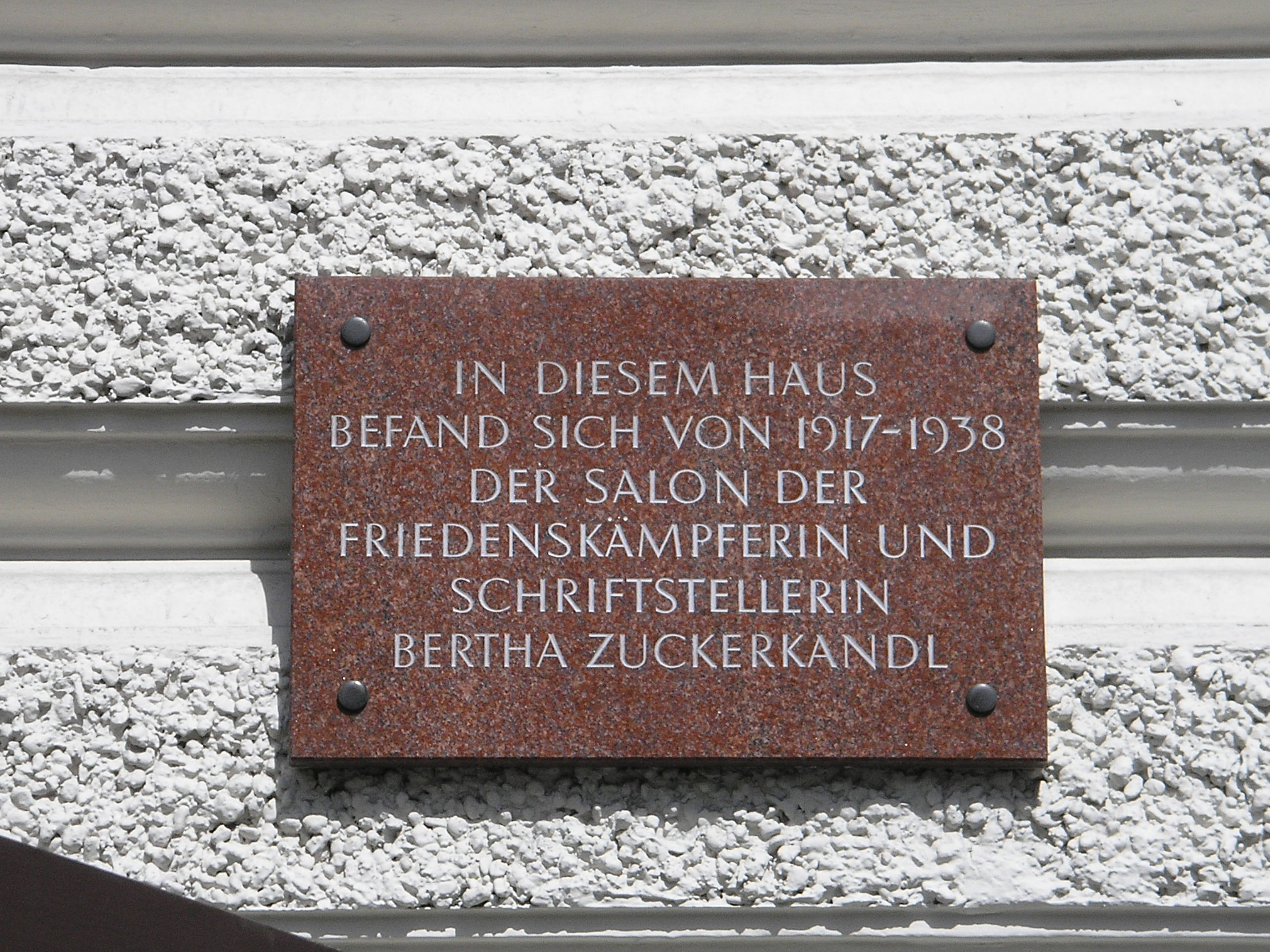
Memorial plaque for the salon of Bertha Zuckerkandl on Palais Lieben-Auspitz in Vienna

The Salon of Berta Zuckerkandl-Szeps existed in Vienna from 1888 until just before Anschluss in1938. It was located in Zuckerkandl's residence, first in Nußwaldgasse in Vienna-Döbling, then in the Palais Lieben-Auspitz on the Ringstraße next to Burgtheater and opposite of Rathaus and Universität.

The first salon of Berta Zuckerkandl was held in a mansion in the Nußwaldgasse in Döbling. Later it was held in the Palais Lieben-Auspitz at the Oppolzergasse 6 at the Ringstraße. The salon was formed in the tradition of Fanny von Arnstein's literary salons in the days of the Congress of Vienna.

Bertha Zuckerkandl's salon claimed such famous participants as Gustav Klimt, Gustav Mahler, Max Reinhardt, Arthur Schnitzler and Alma Mahler. She also supported such artists as Anton Kolig and Sebastian Isepp from the so-called Nötscher Kreis.

Her sister Sofie was married to Paul Clemenceau, the brother of the French Prime Minister Georges Clemenceau, giving the salon connections to Parisian circles.

== Establishing the salon in Nußwaldgasse ==
Zuckerkandl reminisced the following about her original salon towards the end of her life in exile:

"Bald war unser Haus das Zentrum einer Gruppe von Freunden; Künstlern, Wissenschaftlern, Musikern. Seit meiner frühesten Jugend war ich gewohnt gewesen, Gäste zu empfangen. Ich tat dies in einer oft unkonventionellen Art aber man kam genre und oft in unser „Traumhaus". Wir entdeckten auch eine andere Anziehungskraft: die großen Nußbäume in unserem Garten. Es waren (historisch festgestellt) dieselben Bäume, unter welchen Beethoven einst saß und Symphonien schrieb. Nun neckte mich einer unserer haufigsten Besuchäme amit, daß er immer sagte, er kame gar nicht zu mir, sondern zu den Nußbäumen, in deren Schatten er sich inspiriert fühle. Dieser Besucher war Johann Strauß, dessen Name unter allen berühmten Namen des XIX. Jahrhunderts mit Wien am engsten verbunden ist. Damals war er schon ein alter Mann, doch immer noch so lebendig, daß sein ganzer Körper vom Rhythmus des Walzers erfüllt schien."

Approximate translation (needs revising from a German native speaker:

Her residence became a gathering place for a circle of friends, artists, scientists, and musicians. From an early age, Zuckerkandl was accustomed to hosting visitors, frequently adopting an unconventional approach to hospitality that attracted regular guests to the home. The property's garden contained large nut trees, which were historically documented as the location where Ludwig van Beethoven had previously sat while writing symphonies. These trees also served as a focal point for regular visitors; composer Johann Strauss II, whose work is closely associated with 19th-century Vienna, frequently frequented the garden, noting that he found creative inspiration in their shade later in his life.
