= Café Landtmann =

Traditional Viennese café in Innere Stadt, Austria

Coordinates: 48°12′41″N 16°21′40″E

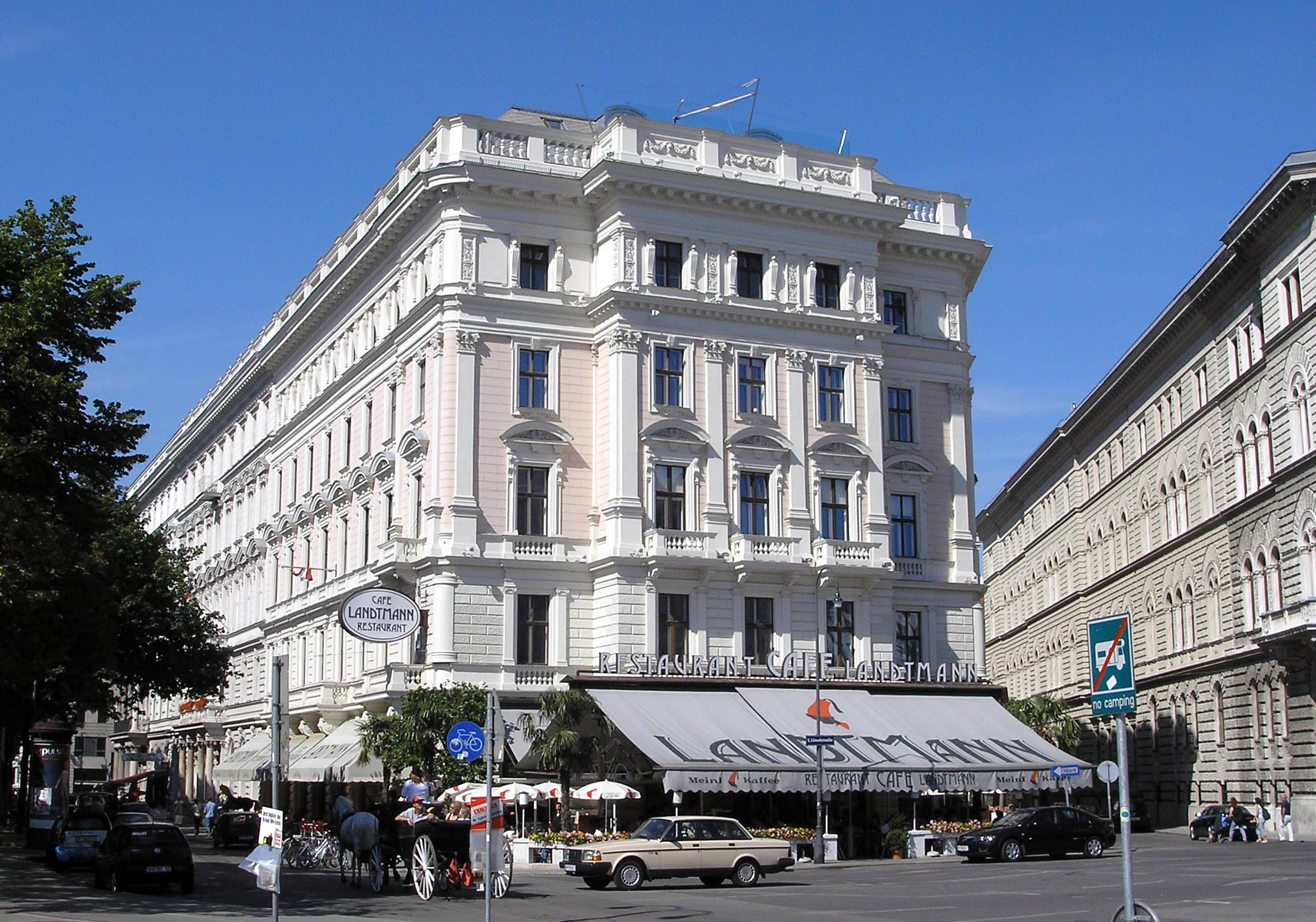
Café Landtmann in Vienna, Austria

Café Landtmann is a traditional Viennese café located on the Ringstraße at the corner of Lowelstraße 22 in the Innere Stadt first district in Vienna, Austria.

== Location ==
The café occupies the ground floor of the Palais Lieben-Auspitz, which is near the Burgtheater, the University of Vienna, the Town Hall with the Rathauspark, and the Federal Chancellery.

== History ==
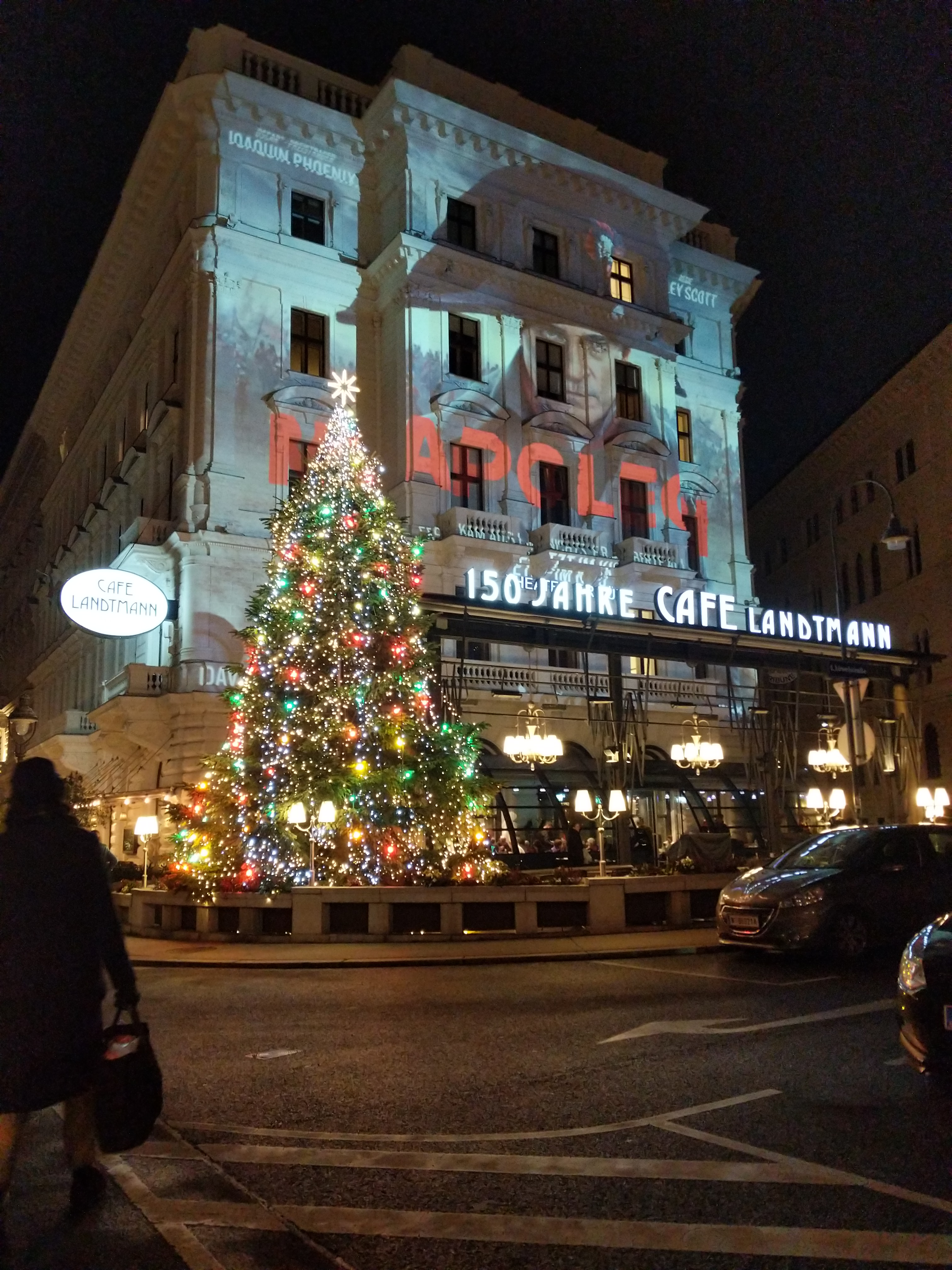
Exterior of Café Landtmann, November 2023

Café Landtmann was founded by Franz Landtmann on 1 October 1873. Originally from the Währing district, Landtmann came from a family of coffeehouse owners, gingerbread bakers, and fig coffee manufacturers. At the time the original café opened, its Ringstraße location was directly opposite two vast construction sites for the new Town Hall and the new university. Next to the café were the remains of Löwelbastei, where the Burgtheater would later be built.

In 1881, Landtmann sold his café to two brothers, Wilhelm and Rudolf Kerl, who continued to run the business under the name Landtmann. After Rudolf retired, Wilhelm ran the café alone and became a local celebrity, with prominent figures like Gustav Mahler, Sigmund Freud, and Emmerich Kálmán visiting him regularly. In 1916, after 35 years of running the business, Wilhelm sold Café Landtmann to Karl Kraus, a former butcher and restaurateur. Together with the Hokare Ges.m.b.H. private limited company, Kraus ran the café for five years.

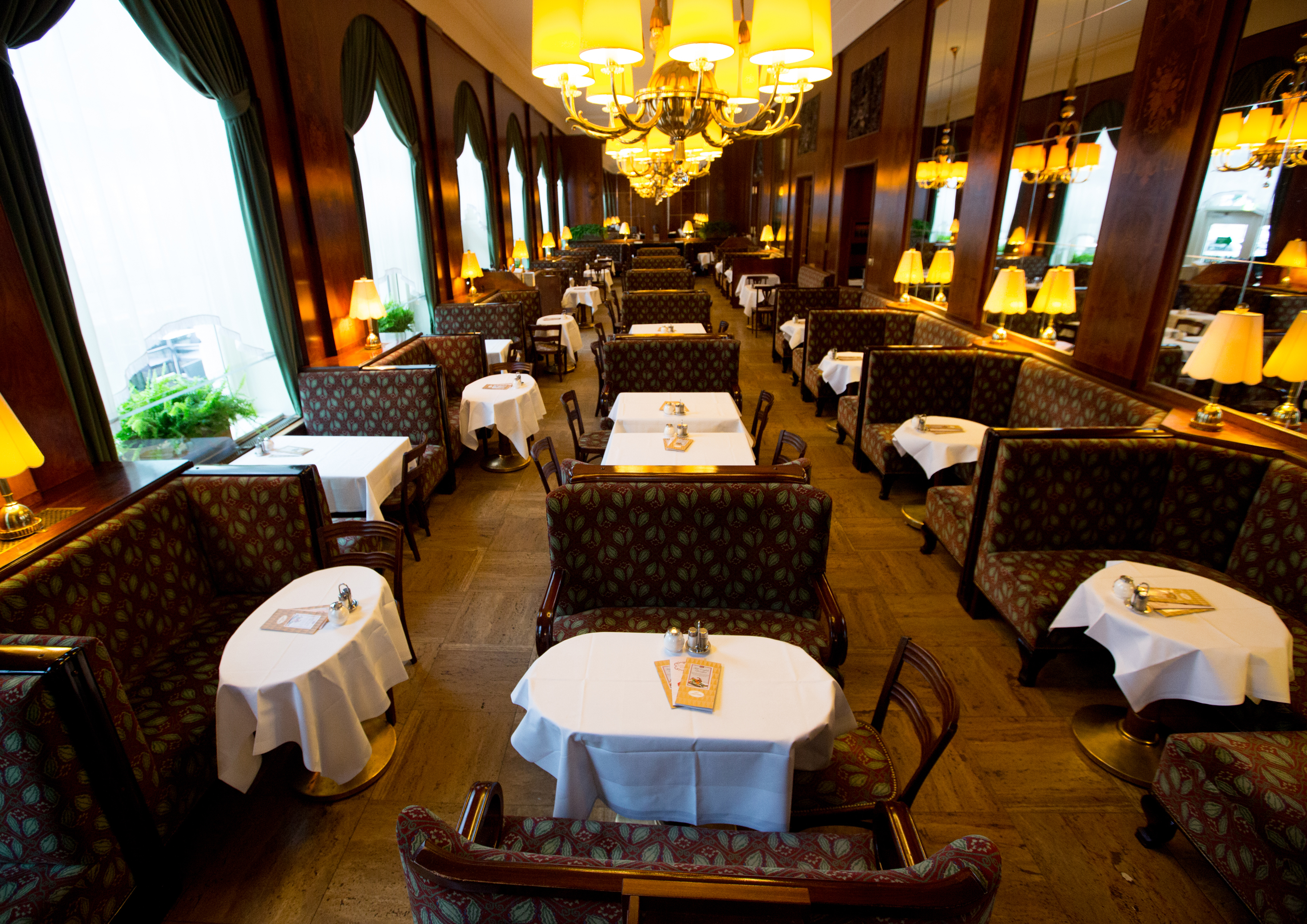
Café Landtmann interior

In the fall of 1926, Café Landtmann was purchased by Konrad and Angela Zauner. In 1929, the couple had the coffeehouse expanded and completely renovated, hiring famed architect and professor Ernst Meller, who was responsible for designing numerous Viennese coffeehouses of that time. It was during this renovation that Café Landtmann received its extravagant and lavish interior decorations, which are still preserved to this day, including the four wooden columns at the entrance, sculpted by Hans Scheibner. Following World War II, Konrad turned over the management of the café to his son Erwin, who continued running it successfully until 1976, when it was sold to the Querfeld family.

Under the Querfeld family's management, Café Landtmann was completely renovated at significant financial cost in 1982, and then again in 2001 and 2002. On 1 October 1998, for the 125th anniversary of Café Landtmann, the Querfeld family organized a large party attended by celebrities from the political and cultural life of the city, as well as many regular patrons. In 2003, the café's famous head waiter Robert Böck, known as "Herr Robert," retired after serving there for 28 years.

During its long history, Café Landtmann served as a meeting place for many of the leading industrialists, politicians, thinkers, and artists in Austria, and was the preferred coffeehouse of Sigmund Freud, Gustav Mahler, Peter Altenberg, Felix Salten, and Emmerich Kálmán. Café Landtmann is mentioned in James A. Michener's novel Poland, as well as Eva Ibbotson's The Morning Gift.

== See also ==
- List of restaurants in Vienna
