= Moritz Szeps =

Austrian newspaper tycoon

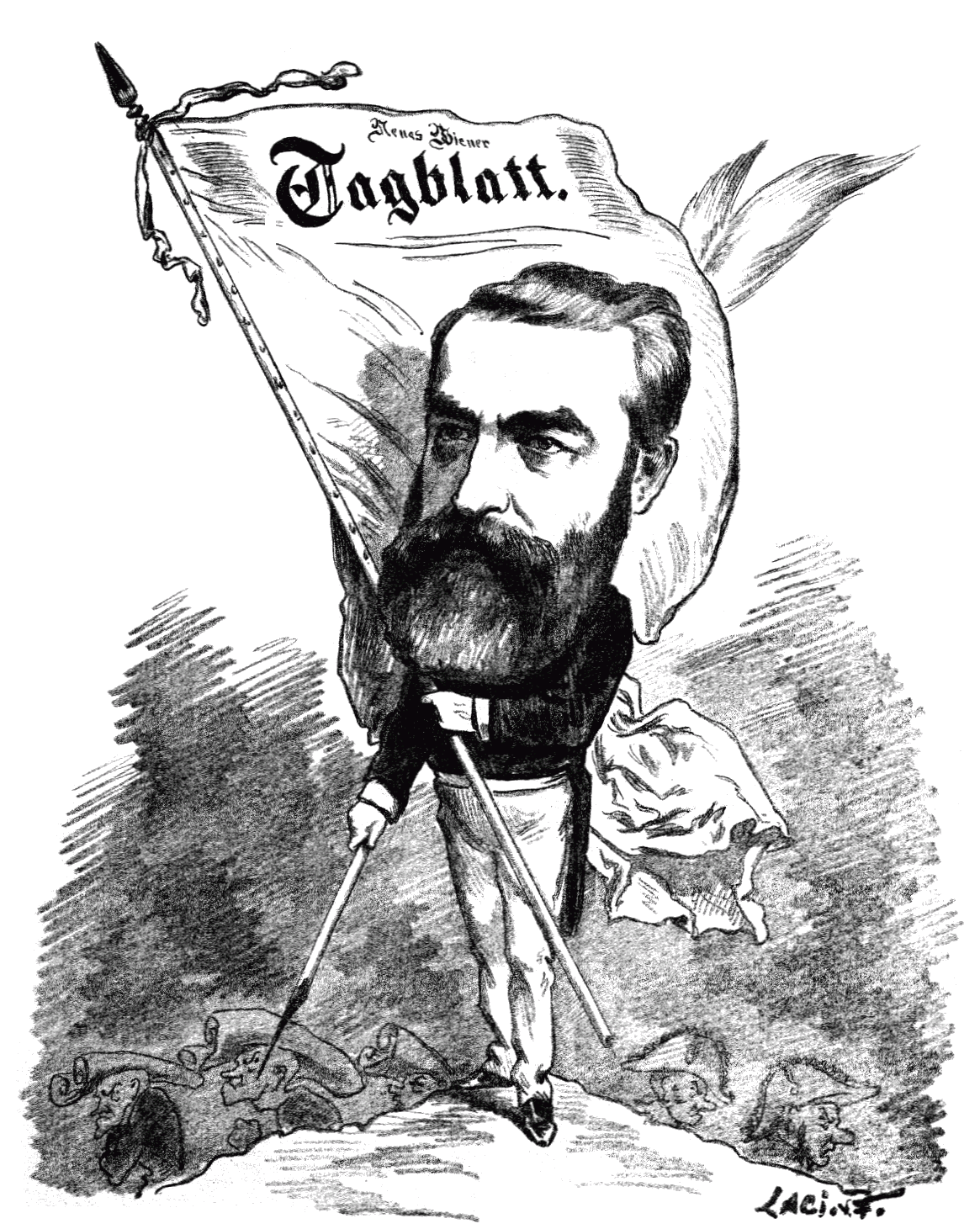
Moritz Szeps; caricature by László von Frecskay from Die Bombe (1877)

Moritz Szeps (5 November 1835, Busk – 9 August 1902, Vienna) was an Austrian newspaper tycoon who founded and published the daily papers Neues Wiener Tagblatt (1867-1886), Wiener Tagblatt (1886-1894), and the first popular-science magazine Das Wissen für Alle (1900).

== Early life ==
Szeps was born into a Jewish family in Busk, Ukraine in 1835. His father was a doctor, and he initially studied medicine in Lemberg (now Lviv). After going to Vienna to continue his studies, he decided to change careers and became a journalist instead.

== Journalism and publishing ==
From 1855 to 1867, he was editor-in-chief of the Morgen-Post. In 1867, following the resignation of most of its employees, he took over the Neues Wiener Tagblatt, which became the leading liberal newspaper in Austria in the 1870s and 1890s. As a close friend of Crown Prince Rudolf, Szeps published Rudolf's political, reform-laden writings anonymously in his paper. Szeps, however, was not shy about making direct attacks on his opponents and critics. By 1876, he was sufficiently successful to build his own home, the "Palais Szeps", which is now the residence of the Swedish Ambassador to Austria.

Eventually, his financial backers wanted him to be more cautious and, in 1886, eased him out of the company. With the help of a Hungarian financier, he purchased the Morgen-Post and changed its name to the Wiener Tagblatt (after 1901, Wiener Morgenzeitung). The paper eventually failed to meet expectations, and was discontinued in 1905.

Like the Crown Prince, Szeps felt that Austria should emulate France, rather than reactionary Prussia. Therefore, he had numerous contacts in Paris, including Georges Clemenceau, the later French prime minister, who was also a newspaper editor at that time. This attitude was met with fierce opposition by the pro-German and pan-German nationalists, who were becoming increasingly anti-Semitic. When the Crown Prince died at his own hand in 1889, the liberal cause as well as the anti-German cause suffered serious setbacks and Szeps's finances dwindled accordingly.

== Legacy ==
Szeps' youngest daughter, Berta Zuckerkandl, became a well known writer, journalist and art critic. Berta and her husband Emil Zuckerkandl created a brilliant, most influential salon for artists and writers that was for many decades the center of Vienna cultural life. His other daughter, Sophie, married Paul Clemenceau, the brother of the prime minister of France.
