= Palais Lieben-Auspitz =

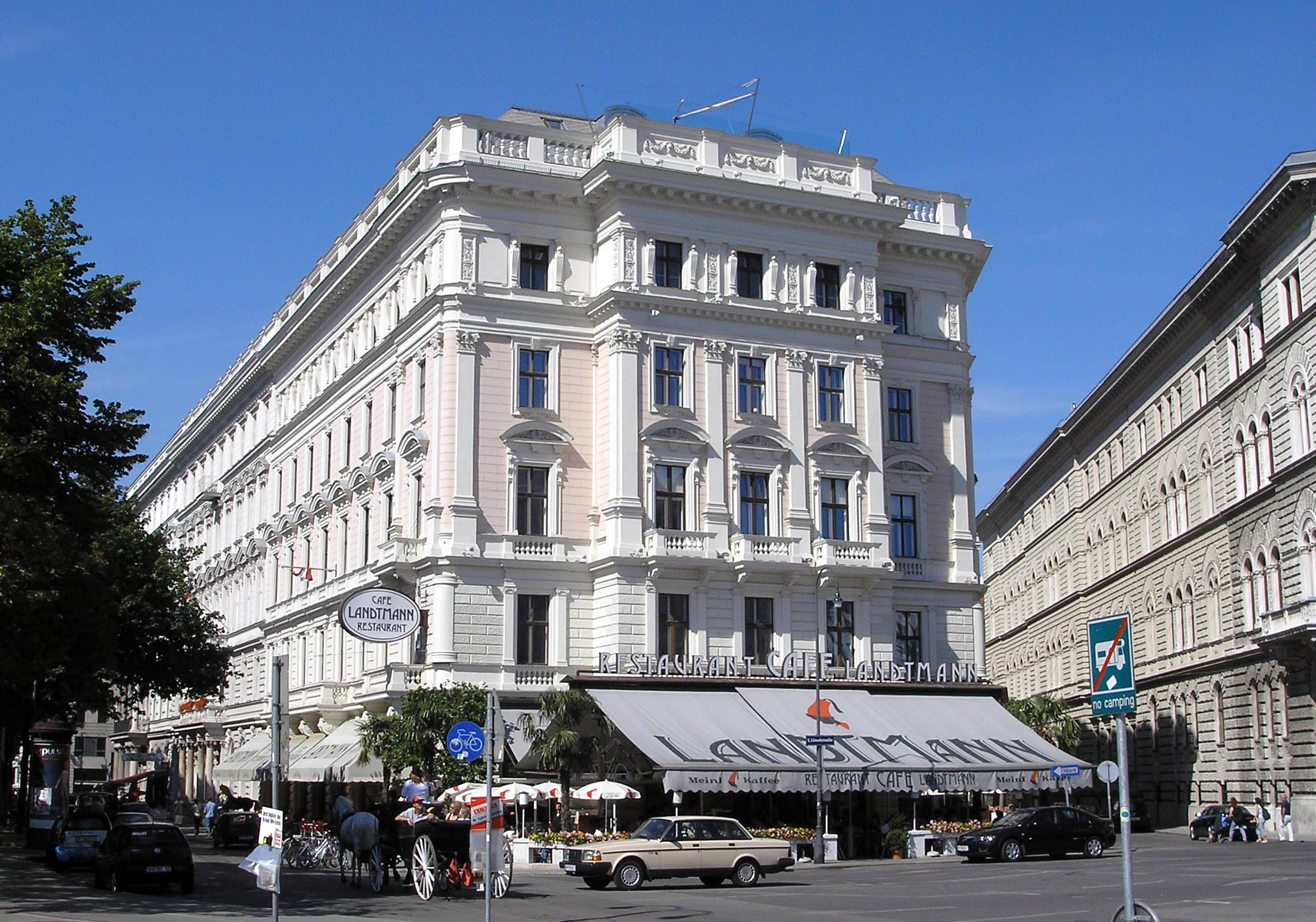

- Location within Austria

General information
- Type: Ringstraßenpalais
- Architectural style: Neo-Baroque
- Location: Universitätsring 4, 1010 Vienna, Austria
- Coordinates: 48°12′42″N 16°21′41″E
- Completed: 1874

Palais Lieben-Auspitz is a Ringstraßenpalais in Vienna, Austria, located in the city's Innere Stadt. Situated on the street level is Café Landtmann.

The building was originally constructed from 1873 to 1874 for Rudolf Auspitz and members of the Lieben family. Unlike traditional, Baroque noble palaces in Vienna, Palais Lieben-Auspitz was built during the late 19th century and is therefore called a Ringstraßenpalais. It is up to five storeys high and was designed in the Neo-Baroque style typical of its time.

The palace once housed the Salon of Berta Zuckerkandl, a meeting place for intellectuals and artists.
