= Pester =

Pester may refer to:

== Fictional characters ==
- Pester (comics), a Marvel Comics character
- Professor Pester, the main villain in the animated television series Viva Piñata
- Rex Pester, a reporter in the animated film The Rugrats Movie

== People ==
- Bill Pester, a.k.a. the Hermit of Palm Springs
- De Pester(s), a Dutch noble family
- Lorie (singer) (born 1982), born Laure Pester, French pop singer
- Paul Pester, chief executive officer (CEO) of TSB Bank (United Kingdom)

== Other uses ==
- Pešter, a plateau in southwestern Serbia
- Pester Lloyd, a German-language weekly newspaper in Hungary

== See also ==
- Annoyance
- Nagging
- Nudge (disambiguation)
- Peștere (disambiguation)
