= Peștera (disambiguation) =

Peștera may refer to several places in Romania:

- Peștera, a commune in Constanța County
- Peștera (Hungarian: Pestera), a village in Moieciu Commune, Brașov County
- Peștera, a village in Dej city, Cluj County
- Peștera, a village in Băița Commune, Hunedoara County
- Peștera, a village in Petroșani city, Hunedoara County
- Peștera, a village in Sălașu de Sus Commune, Hunedoara County
- Peștera (Danube), a river in Constanța County, tributary of the Danube
- Peștera, a river in Hunedoara County, tributary of the Căian

== See also ==
- Peștere (disambiguation)
