= Alfred Polgar =

German essayist, theater critic, writer, translator

- Born: Polak; 17 October 1873 Vienna, Austria
- Died: 24 April 1955 (aged 81) Zürich, Switzerland
- Occupation: essayist, theater critic, writer, translator
- Genre: feuilleton, essay, critic
- Literary movement: Wiener Moderne

Alfred Polgar (originally: Alfred Polak; 17 October 1873 in Vienna – 24 April 1955 in Zurich) was an Austrian-born columnist, theater critic, writer and occasionally translator.

== Life and work ==
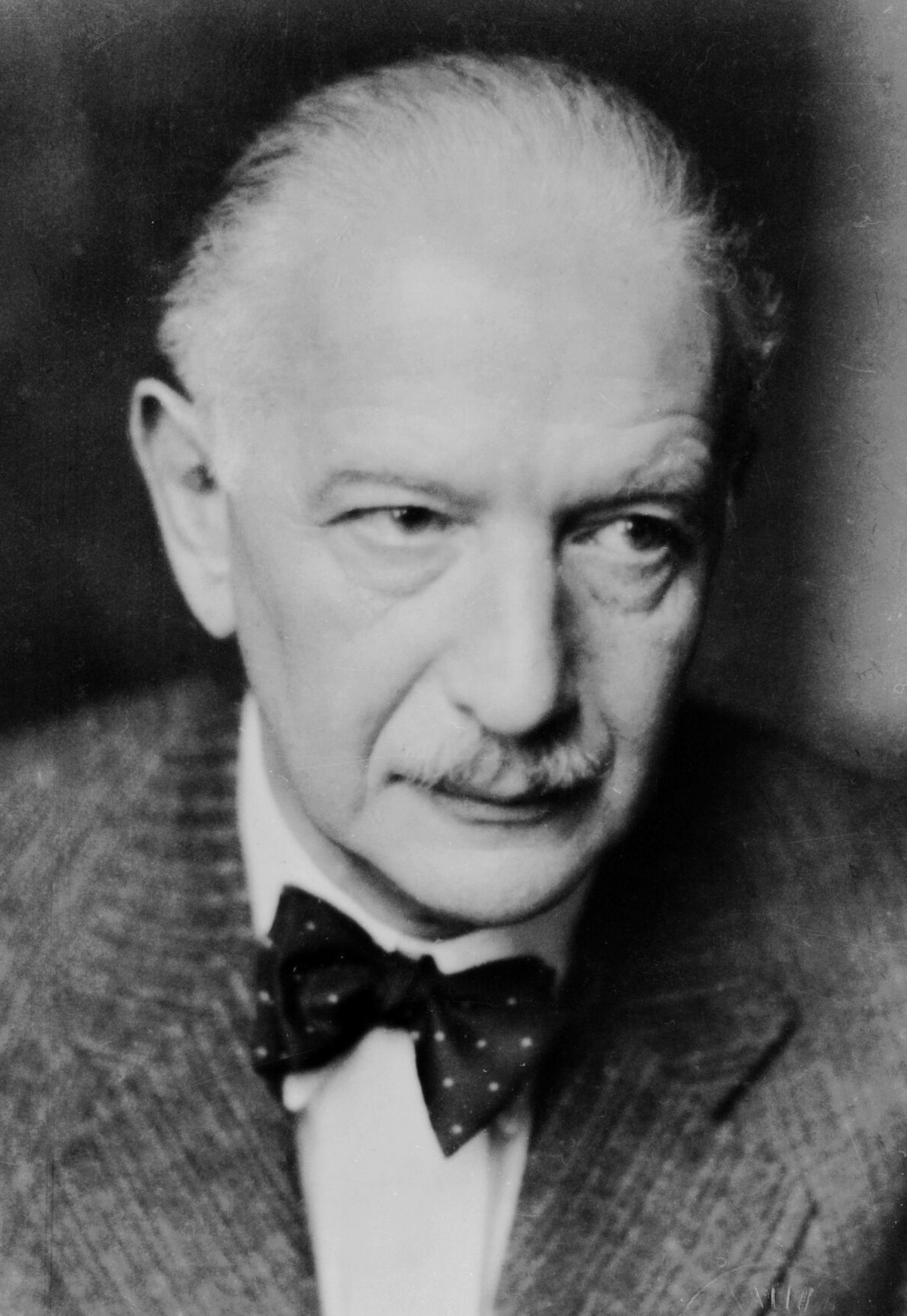
Alfred Polgar, photography by Max Fenichel

=== 1873—1895 ===
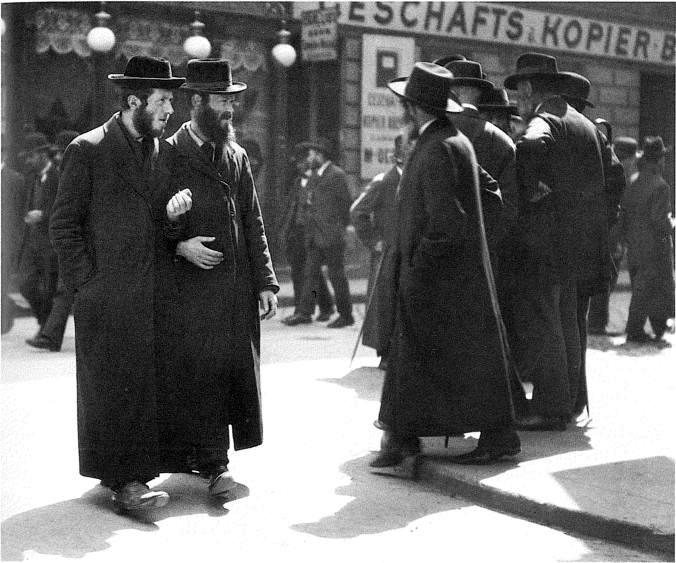
Jewish life and culture in Leopoldstadt, 1915

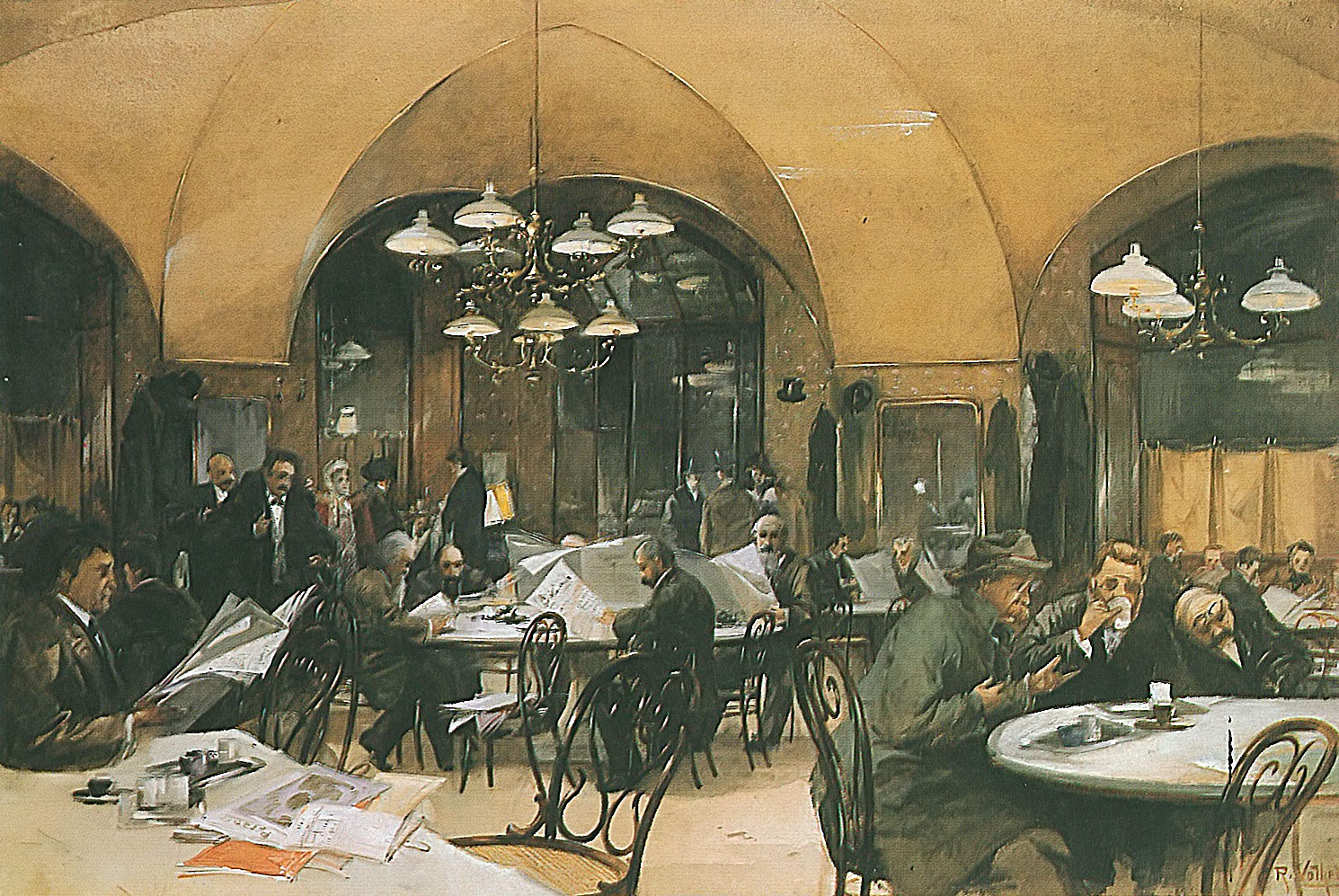
Café Griensteidl (1896), gathering place of artists and writers

He was born in an assimilated Jewish family in Leopoldstadt, the municipal District of Vienna, which had a Jewish life and culture. He grew up as the youngest of three children of Henriette and Josef Polak, a piano school owner. He graduated from high school and business school. 1895 he joined the team of the "Wiener Allgemeine Zeitung", where he initially worked as a reporter with the main focus of ‚court‘ and the ‚houses of Parliament‘. After a while he advanced there as an editor in the features section. During this time he soon joined the circle around Peter Altenberg and other freethinking persons. With his feature articles and astute local and theater reviews, he developed into one of the most important representatives of the so-called Vienna coffeehouses literature.

=== 1905 to 1914 ===
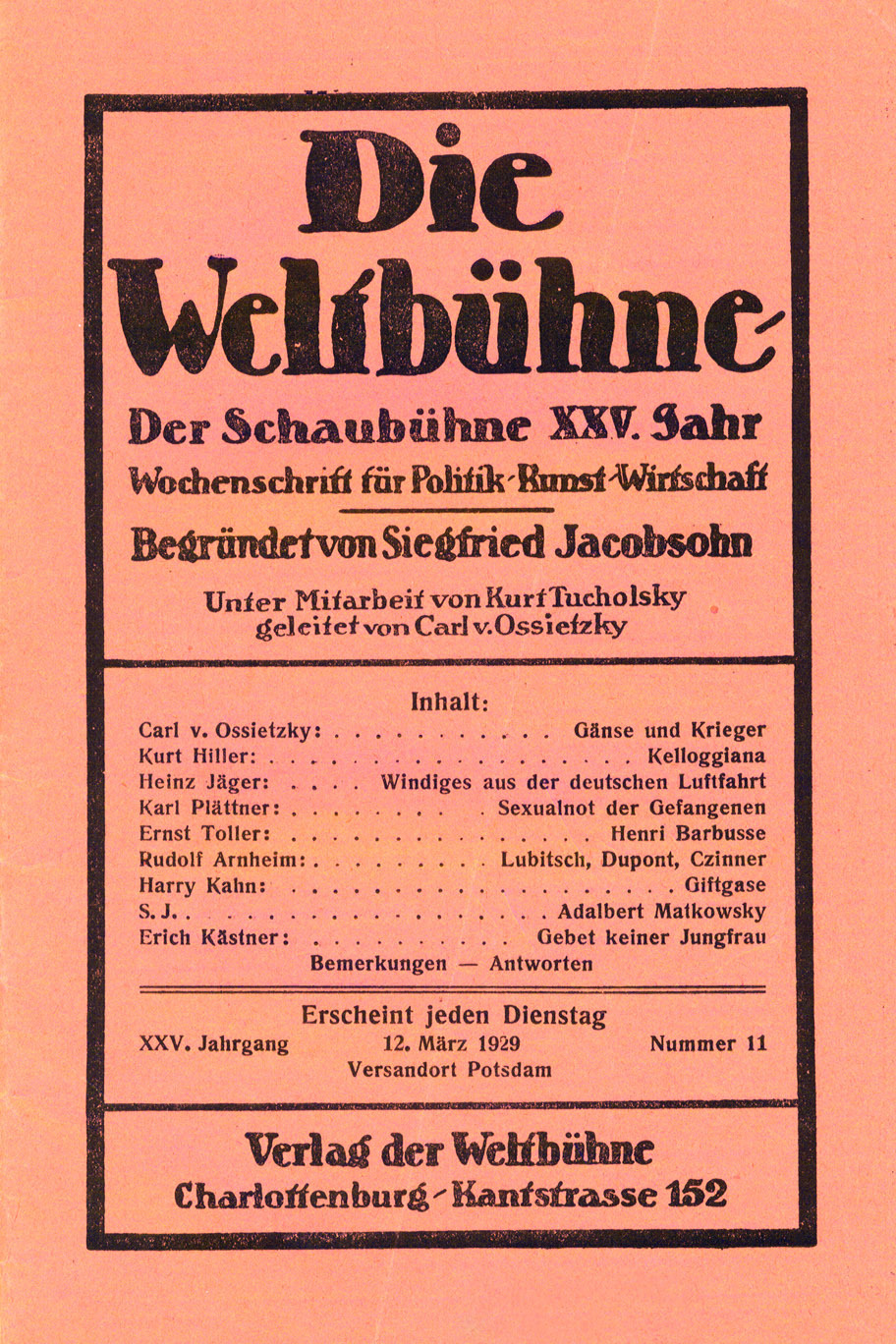
Cover of Die Weltbühne, 1929

Since 1905 Polgar wrote regularly for Siegfried Jacobsohn's magazine Die Schaubühne. He also worked as a writer for cabaret. Together with Egon Friedell, he wrote the successful humorous piece Goethe for the Fledermaus Cabaret in 1908. A grotesque in two acts, in which literary lessons in schools are parodied by the fact that Johann Wolfgang von Goethe appears for a literary exam on Goethe's life and work - and fails. Also 1908, Polgar's first book Der Quell des Übels und andere Geschichten (The Source of Evil and Other Stories) was published. The place where Polgar frequented at this time was Café Central where he could be found in the company of Peter Altenberg, Anton Kuh, Adolf Loos and said Egon Friedell. There he found plenty of material for his astute observations and analyzes. Polgar also worked as an editor and translator of plays, for example by Nestroy, and in 1913 translated Ferenc Molnár's play Liliom from Hungarian into German. He moved the plot to the Vienna Prater and added a prologue, which paved the way for the previously unsuccessful play with a triumphant premiere on February 28, 1913 in the Theater in der Josefstadt in Vienna. On September 23, 1914, he officially changed his name from Polak to Polgar (Hungarian polgár = German citizen). During the First World War Polgar must work in the war archive, but continued to write for newspapers, including the German-language Hungarian newspaper Pester Lloyd.

=== 1920—1955 ===
In the 1920s, Polgar lived mainly in Berlin and from here he supplied as a freelancer many articles for daily newspapers such as Berliner Tageblatt, Prager Tageblatt and for the weekly published literary magazine Die Weltbühne. As a engaged columnist he enriched the college in which such illustrious people worked like Erich Kästner, Else Lasker-Schüler, Erich Mühsam, Kurt Tucholsky, Robert Walser. In October 1929 he married Elise Loewy, born Müller, called Lisl, from Vienna. After the Nazi regime came to power, there was no place for the “Austrian Jew and left-liberal anti-fascist Polgar in National Socialist Germany”, as Ulrich Weinzierl points. At the beginning of March 1933 he fled to Prague. On May 10, 1933, his books were burned. Later he went to Vienna. In 1937/38 he wrote about Marlene Dietrich; a text found by his biographer Ulrich Weinzierl in New York in 1984, and posthumously published in 2015. During the Anschluss in March 1938, Alfred and Lisl Polgar were in Zurich. Because he could not get a work permit there, they fled to Paris. After the Germans invaded France in June 1940, he fled to Marseille, from where in October 1940, with the help of the Emergency Rescue Committee, he managed to escape via the Pyrenees to Spain and via Lisbon to emigrate to the USA. In Hollywood he worked, among other things, as a screenwriter for Metro-Goldwyn-Mayer. From 1943 he lived in New York, where he and his wife received American citizenship. In 1949 they returned to Europe and settled in Zurich. In 1951 Polgar received the Preis der Stadt Wien für Publizistik which has been awarded annually since 1951 and endowed with eight thousand Euros. He died in 1955 and was buried in the Sihlfeld cemetery in Zurich.

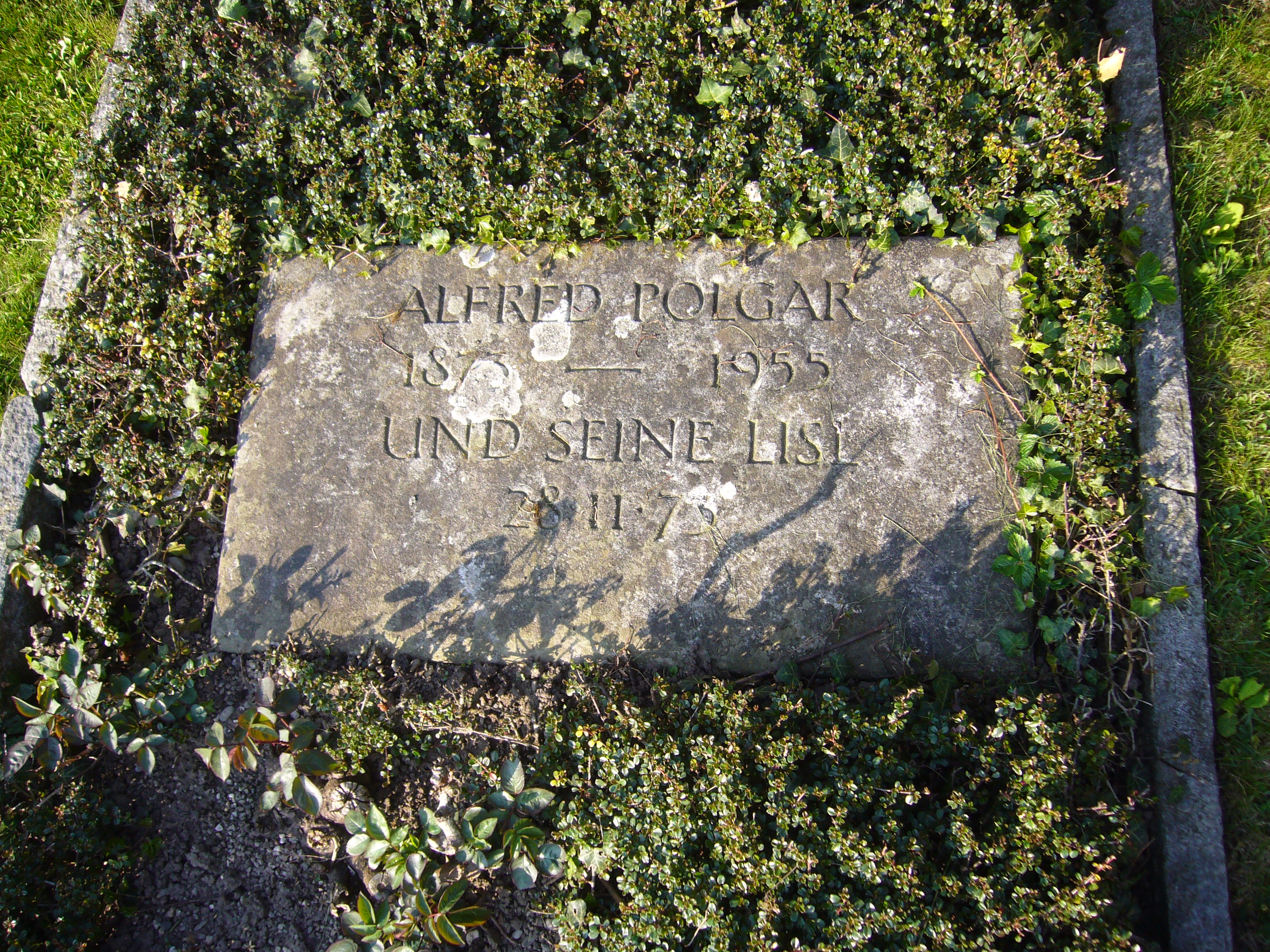
Gravestone of Alfred and Lisl Polgar at the Sihlfeld cemetery

== Awards and honors ==
- 1951: Preis der Stadt Wien für Publizistik
- 1965: Polgarstraße in the 22. Wiener Gemeindebezirk, Donaustadt.
- The school located in this street was named Polgar-Gymnasium.

== Works ==
- Der Quell des Übels und andere Geschichten. Verlag für Literatur und Kunst, München 1908.
- Bewegung ist alles. Novellen und Skizzen. Literarische Anstalt Rütten & Loening, Frankfurt am Main 1909.
- Hiob. Ein Novellenband. Albert Langen, München 1912.
- Kleine Zeit. Fritz Gurlitt, Berlin 1919.
- Max Pallenberg. Erich Reiß Verlag, Berlin 1921.
- Gestern und heute. R. Kaemmerer, Dresden 1922.
- Orchester von oben. E. Rowohlt, Berlin 1926:
- An den Rand geschrieben. E. Rowohlt, Berlin 1926.
- Ja und Nein (4 vol.). E. Rowohlt, Berlin 1926/27.
- Ich bin Zeuge. E. Rowohlt, Berlin 1927.
- Schwarz auf Weiß. E. Rowohlt, Berlin 1929.
- Hinterland. E. Rowohlt; Berlin 1929.
- Bei dieser Gelegenheit. E. Rowohlt, Berlin 1930.
- Ansichten. Rowohlt, Berlin 1933.
- In der Zwischenzeit. Allert de Lange, Amsterdam 1935.
- Sekundenzeiger. Humanitas-Verlag, Zürich 1937.
- Handbuch des Kritikers. Oprecht, Zürich 1938.
- Geschichten ohne Moral. Oprecht, Zürich 1943.
- Anderseits. Querido, Amsterdam 1948.
- Begegnung im Zwielicht. Blanvalet, Berlin 1951.
- Standpunkte. Rowohlt, Hamburg 1953.
- Fensterplatz. Rowohlt, Berlin 1959.
- Die Mission des Luftballons. Skizzen und Erwägungen. Volk und Welt, Berlin 1975.
- Taschenspiegel. Löcker, Wien 1979, ISBN 978-3-85409-006-9.
- Sperrsitz. Löcker, Wien 1980.
- Lieber Freund! Lebenszeichen aus der Fremde. Zsolnay, Wien, Hamburg 1981.
- Marlene – Bild einer berühmten Zeitgenossin. Zsolnay, Wien 2015, ISBN 978-3-552-05721-0

== Editions ==
- Im Vorüberfahren. Büchergilde Gutenberg, Frankfurt am Main 1960.
- Bei Lichte betrachtet. Rowohlt, Reinbek 1970; edited by Bernt Richter.
- Kleine Schriften. Hrsg. von Marcel Reich-Ranicki/Ulrich Weinzierl, Rowohlt, Reinbek 1982–1986.
- Harry Rowohlt (Ed.): Alfred Polgar. Das große Lesebuch. Kein & Aber, Zürich 2003, ISBN 3-0369-5116-4.

== Translation ==
- Ferenc Molnár: Liliom. Vorstadtlegende in 7 Bildern und einem szenischen Prolog. Übersetzung aus dem Ungarischen und Bearbeitung des Stücks. Deutsch-Österreichischer Vlg., Wien/Leipzig 1912.

== Selected filmography ==
- The Virtuous Sinner (1931)
- The Golden Anchor (1932)
- The Burning Secret (1933)

== Lexicon entry ==
- Herbert A. Straus, Werner Röder (Ed.): International Biographical Dictionary of Central European Emigrés 1933–1945. Vol. 2/I: A–K. Saur, München 1983, ISBN 3-598-10089-2.
- Ulrich Weinzierl (2001). "Polgar, Alfred". Neue Deutsche Biographie (in German). Vol. 20. Berlin: Duncker & Humblot. pp. 598–600. (full text online).
