= Café Schwarzenberg =

Viennese coffee house in Austria

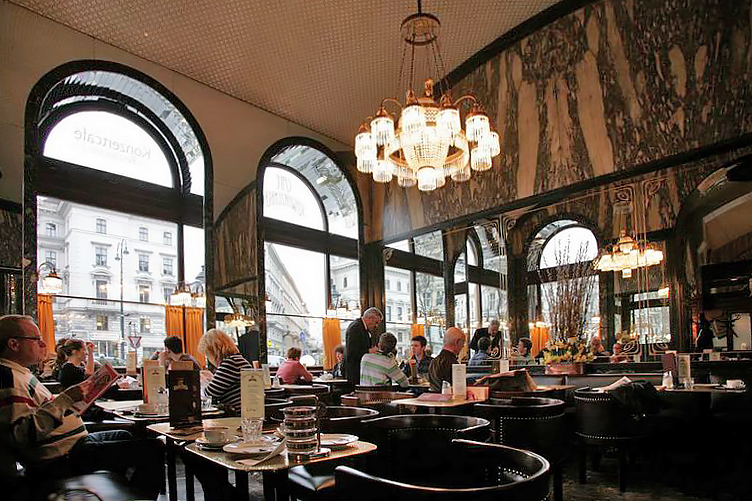
- Interior of Café Schwarzenberg
- Interactive map of Café Schwarzenberg
- Address: Kärntner Ring No. 17
- Location: Vienna, Austria
- Coordinates: 48°12′07″N 16°22′24″E
- Owner: Vivatis Food Company
- Type: Viennese coffee house

Construction
- Opened: 1861

Website
- web.archive.org/web/20130927215257/http://www.cafe-schwarzenberg.at/en/index.html

Café Schwarzenberg is a traditional Viennese coffee house, located on the Ringstraße boulevard (Kärntner Ring No. 17) near Schwarzenbergplatz in the central Innere Stadt district of Vienna, Austria. Unlike many other traditional Viennese coffeehouses, the Cafe Schwarzenberg did not cater to a clientele of artists and intellectuals. The interior is notable for having remained largely unchanged since it was opened in the 19th century.

== History ==
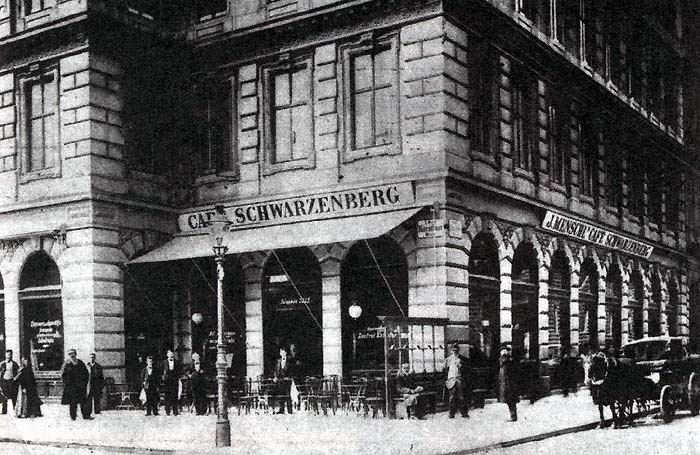
Café Schwarzenberg, late 19th century

Café Schwarzenberg is the oldest existing Ringstraße coffee house, opened during the construction of the prestigious boulevard in 1861 by a married couple with the family name Hochleitner. It quickly became an important meeting place for influential entrepreneurs and financiers. Among the famous frequent guests was the architect Josef Hoffmann (1870–1956), one of the founders of the artistic Wiener Werkstätte manufacturing company. Many of Hoffmann's designs were drafted at Café Schwarzenberg.

Café Schwarzenberg has had the same name since it was taken over by Josef Menschl in 1902. Before that, it was called Café Hochleitner and Café Sperrer, among other names. From 1939 until the end of the war, the name was briefly changed. During this time it was run as Café Deutschland. After 1945 Soviet Army officers occupied the premises for their events, during one of them they destroyed the furnishings with bullets. One relic of this time was kept until the renovations in 1979 – a mirror whose cracks and bullet holes were decorated with vines and floral designs, making a virtue out of necessity.

In 1978 the owner of Café Schwarzenberg (Kom. Rat. Waltersam) was planning to close it down and sell the premises to a car dealership. The former councilor of culture and then mayor Dr. Zilk managed to spare Café Schwarzenberg from this fate. In 1979, Café Schwarzenberg was thoroughly renovated and modernised, and in 1980 it was ceremoniously reopened by the new leaseholder. Although Café Schwarzenberg was never a coffee house of artists and literary figures, it did have a famous regular customer who stayed loyal for years: the architect Josef Hoffmann, founder of Wiener Werkstätte, would be dropped off at lunchtime by his chauffeur and came here to eat, read the daily papers or put his ideas to squared paper. Many of his extraordinary designs were created at the Schwarzenberg. Other famous people, such as the painter Hermann Nitsch or the Burg theatre actress Adrienne Gessner and important individuals from politics and industry, also visited the coffee house.

Today Café Schwarzenberg is one of the last Ringstraße cafés, of which there were once more than 30, that continues the typical atmosphere and tradition of a Viennese Café. According to the Austrian Federal Monuments Office, Café Schwarzenberg still features some major design elements that can be traced back to the refurbishment of the café during the inter-war period. This particularly applies to the corner room to the left of the entrance and the ladies‘ toilet. The walls of the almost square corner room have the original marble cladding, two different types of marble were used. Light and strongly modified surfaces are bordered by dark almost homogeneous black stone. The ceiling is decorated with a delicate mosaic-like panelling with coloured frosted glass plates and gold plating. The square tables with tops made from hammered brass are also part of the original inventory. In walls of the ladies‘ toilet are panelled with black marble and have integrated mirrors with white stone frames. Both ceiling and floors still have the coverings from the twenties. The decoration of both rooms is based on the effect produced by the fine materials such as marble, mirrored glass and brass.

Café Schwarzenberg was run by the Österreichisches Verkehrsbüro travel company until 1 January 2008, when it was purchased by the Austrian Vivatis food company.

Today Café Schwarzenberg with its Schanigarten on the Ringstraße sidewalk is a popular spot with both tourists and locals. As well as hosting a wide variety of cultural events such as readings and concerts, it hosts Kaffeehausmusik ("Coffee House Music") on several evenings during the week. In the Viennese ball season, the Cafe Schwarzenberg is one of the few cafés to offer early morning goulash and beer breakfasts for the ball attendees.

== See also ==
- List of restaurants in Vienna
