= Café Savoy =

Traditional café and gay bar in Vienna, Austria

Coordinates: 48.197615°N 16.360102°E

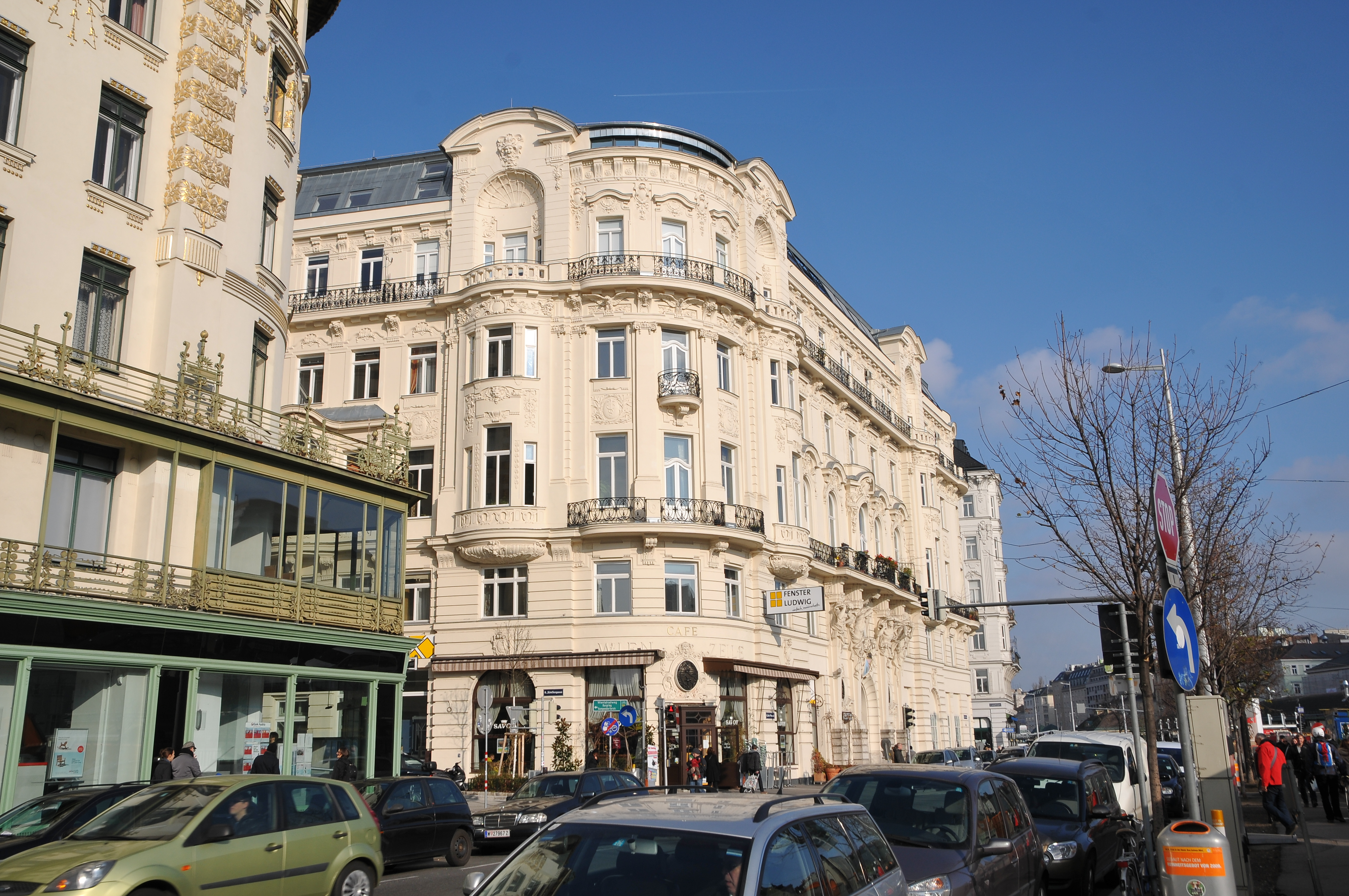
- Café Savoy
- Interactive map of Café Savoy

Restaurant information
- Previous owner: Julius Léon von Wernburg
- Food type: Coffeehouse, café
- Dress code: Casual
- Location: Vienna, Austria
- Website: cafe-savoy.at/en/

The Café Savoy (formerly Café Wienzeile) is a Viennese coffee house and gay bar on the left bank of the Wien river (Linke Wienzeile) in Mariahilf district. It was opened in 1896.

The building itself was designed and built by the architect Franz von Neumann in 1896 and 1897, commissioned by textile manufacturer Julius Léon von Wernburg, who bought the property in 1889. The café moved into the majority of the floor at street level. In the beginning, it carried the name Café Wienzeile, based on its location, and was owned by the Kuszak family, who also operated coffee houses in Prague and Budapest. The architectural style is palatial and the café features two mirrors advertised to be Europe′s largest mirrors formed from one piece after the ones in Palace of Versailles, as well as a chandelier by Theophil von Hansen.

The coffee house was renamed to Café Savoy in 1983 and downsized to just over a third of the ground level and was renovated in 2008 and 2009.
