= Viennese coffee house culture =

Type of café

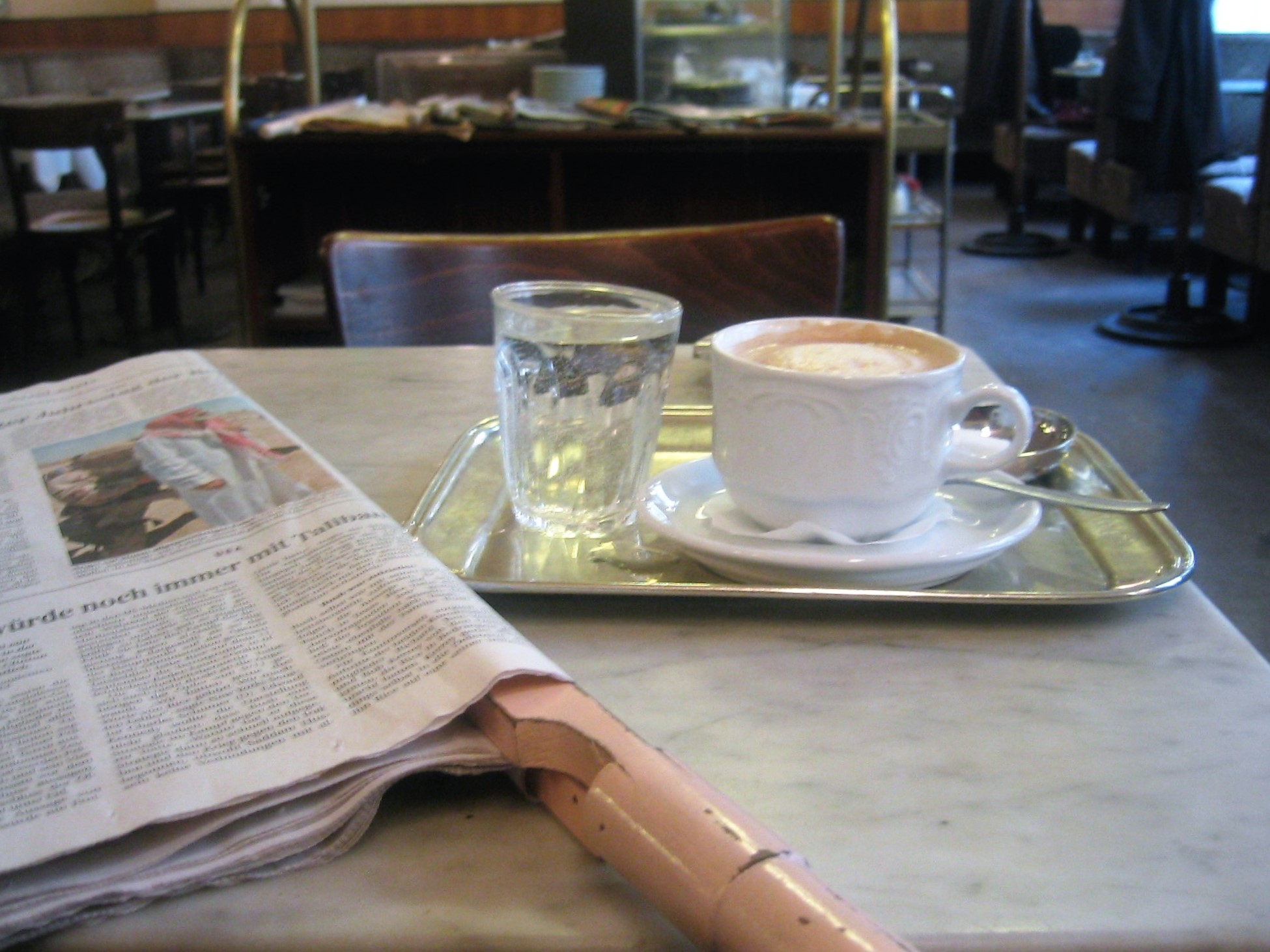
Coffee house culture: the newspaper, the glass of water accompanying the coffee, and the marble tabletop

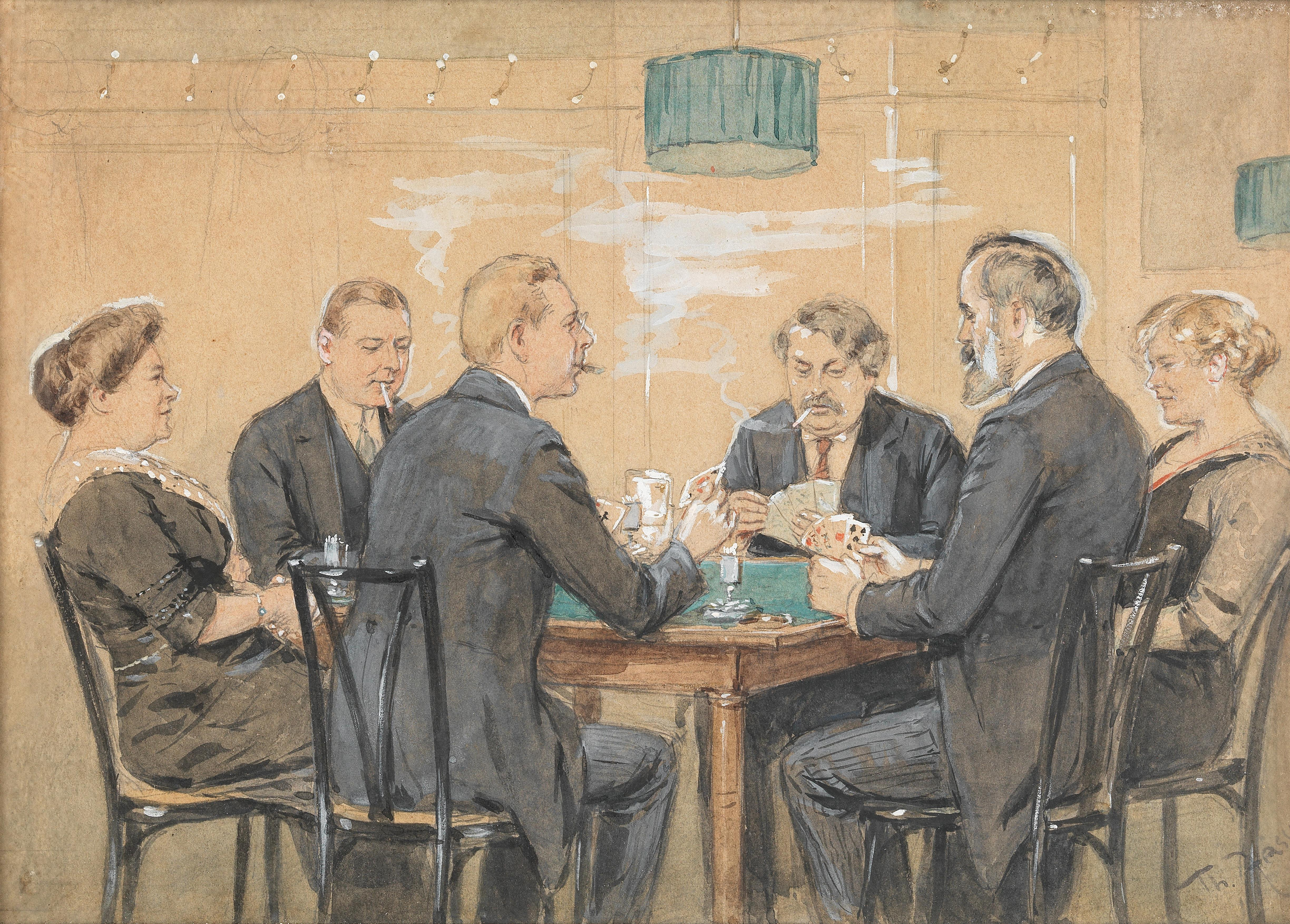
Drawing of card players in a Viennese coffee house, drawn by Theo Zasche.

The Viennese coffee house (German: das Wiener Kaffeehaus, Bavarian: as Weana Kafeehaus) is a typical institution of Vienna that played an important part in shaping Viennese culture.

Since October 2011, the "Viennese coffee house culture" is listed as an Intangible Cultural Heritage (ICH) element by the Austrian National Agency for the Intangible Cultural Heritage. The Viennese coffee house is described in the ICH national inventory as a place, "where time and space are consumed, but only the coffee is found on the bill."

== Characteristics ==
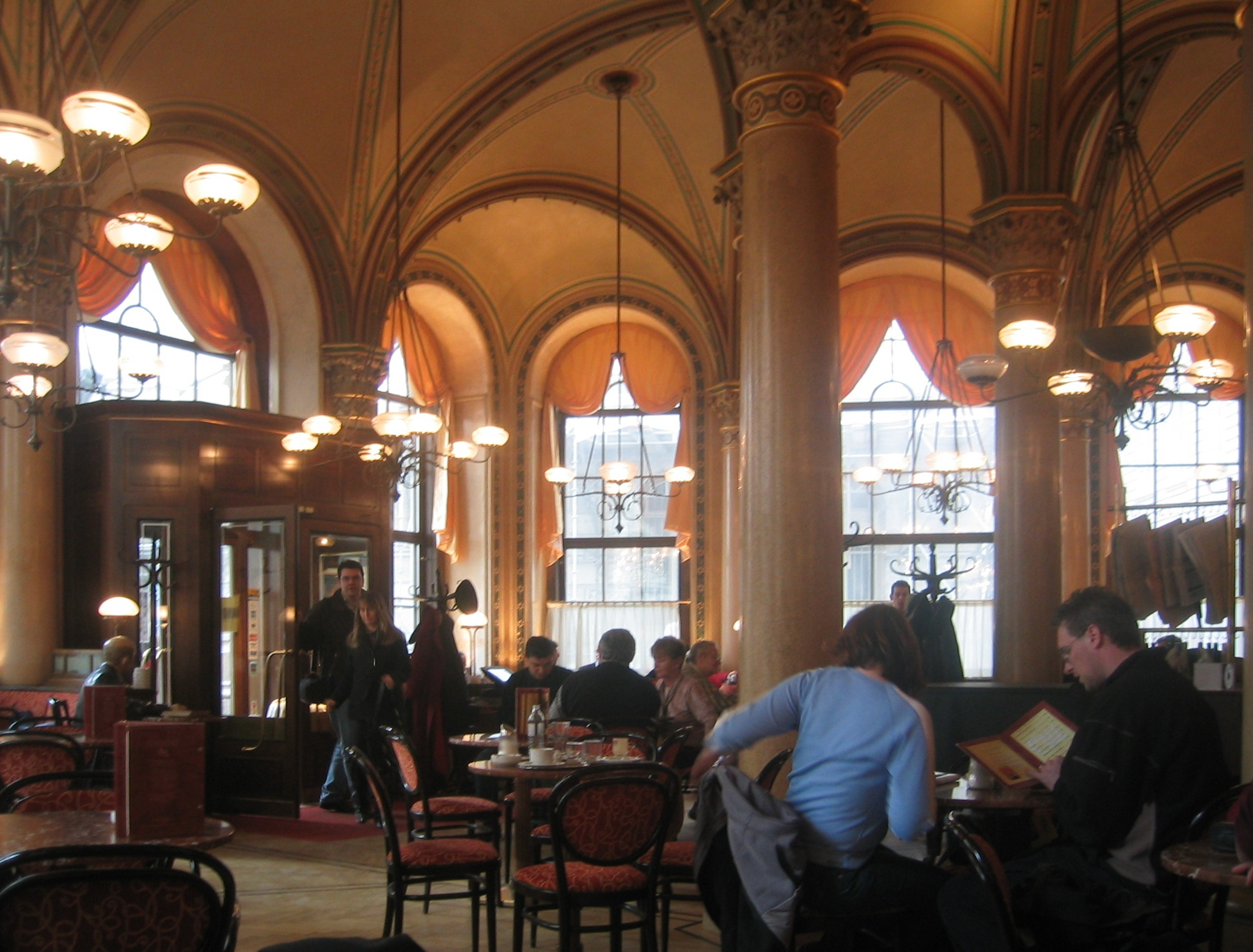
Café Central in Vienna

The social practices, rituals, and elegance create the very specific atmosphere of the Viennese café. Coffee houses entice with a wide variety of coffee drinks, international newspapers, and pastry creations. Typical for Viennese coffee houses are marble tabletops, Thonet chairs, newspaper tables and interior design details in the style of historicism.

The Austrian writer Stefan Zweig described the Viennese coffee house as an institution of a special kind, "actually a sort of democratic club, open to everyone for the price of a cheap cup of coffee, where every guest can sit for hours with this little offering, to talk, write, play cards, receive post, and above all consume an unlimited number of newspapers and journals." Zweig in fact attributed a good measure of Vienna's cosmopolitan air to the rich daily diet of current and international information offered in the coffee houses.

In many classic cafés (for example Café Central and Café Prückel) piano music is played in the evening and social events like literary readings are held. In warmer months, customers can often sit outside in a Schanigarten. Almost all coffee houses provide small food dishes such as sausages, as well as desserts, cakes and tarts, like Apfelstrudel (apple strudel), Millirahmstrudel (milk-cream strudel), Punschkrapfen (punch cake), and Linzer torte.

Unlike some other café traditions around the world, it is considered normal for a customer to linger alone for hours and study the omnipresent newspaper. Along with coffee, the waiter will serve a mandatory glass of cold tap water and during a long stay will often bring additional water unrequested, with the idea to serve the guest with an exemplary sense of attention.

== History ==
=== Early history ===
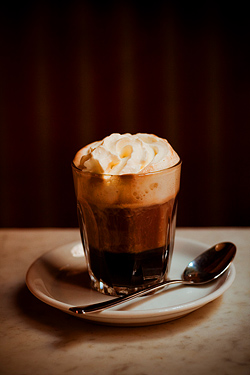
Einspänner coffee: A Viennese specialty. It is a strong black coffee served in a glass topped with whipped cream. It comes with powdered sugar served separately.

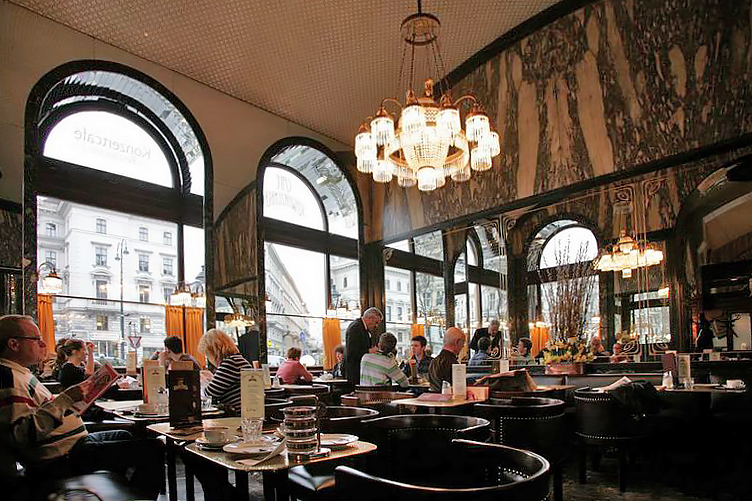
Café Schwarzenberg in Vienna

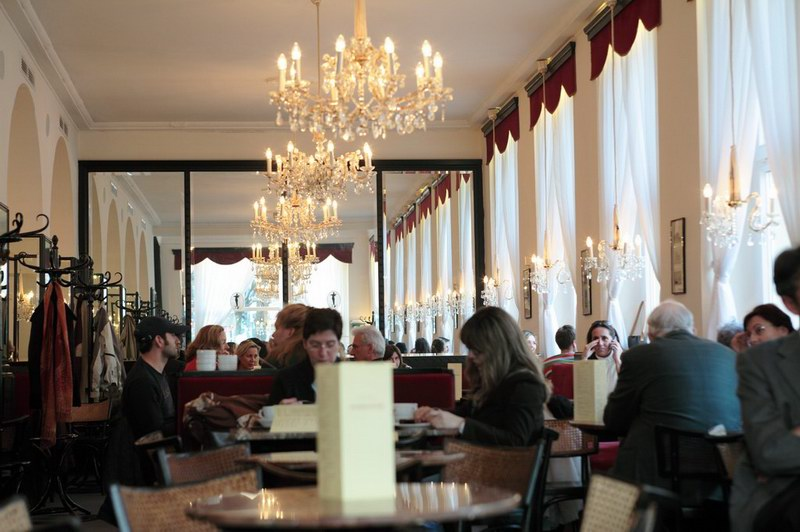
Café Dommayer in Vienna

Legend has it that soldiers of the Polish-Habsburg army, while liberating Vienna from the second Turkish siege in 1683, found a number of sacks with strange beans that they initially thought were camel feed and wanted to burn. The Polish king Jan III Sobieski granted the sacks to one of his officers named Jerzy Franciszek Kulczycki, who, according to Catholic priest Gottfried Uhlich in 1783 in his History of the second Turkish Siege, was assumed to have started the first coffee house, the Hof zur Blauen Flasche.

According to the legend, after some experimentation, Kulczycki added some sugar and milk, and the Viennese coffee tradition was born. This achievement has been recognized in many modern Viennese coffeehouses by hanging a picture of Kulczycki in the window. Another account is that Kulczycki, having spent two years in Ottoman captivity, knew perfectly well what coffee really was and tricked his superiors into granting him the beans that were considered worthless.

However, according to recent research, Vienna's first coffee house was actually opened by an Armenian businessman named Johannes Theodat (aka Johannes Diodato or Deodat and Owanes Astouatzatur) in 1685. 15 years later, four Greek-owned coffeehouses had the privilege to serve coffee.

The new drink was well received, and coffee houses began to pop up rapidly. In the early period, the various drinks had no names, and customers would select the mixtures from a colour-shaded chart.

=== Golden Age ===
In the 19th and early 20th century, leading writers of the time became attached to the atmosphere of Viennese cafés and were frequently seen to meet, exchange and to even write there. Literature composed in cafés is commonly referred to as coffee house literature, the writers thereof as coffee house poets.

The journal Die Fackel ("The Torch") by Karl Kraus is said to have been written in cafés to a large extent. Writer and poet Peter Altenberg had his mail delivered to his favorite café, the Café Central. Other coffee house poets include Arthur Schnitzler, Alfred Polgar, Friedrich Torberg, and Egon Erwin Kisch. Writers such as Peter Altenberg, Egon Friedell, and Hermann Broch made coffee houses their preferred place of work and pleasure. Artists, scientists, and politicians of the period, such as Stefan Zweig, Egon Schiele, Gustav Klimt, Adolf Loos, Theodor Herzl, and Alfred Adler, also frequented coffee houses. Joseph Stalin, Adolf Hitler, Leon Trotsky and Josip Broz Tito were all living in Vienna in 1913, and they were constant coffee house patrons.

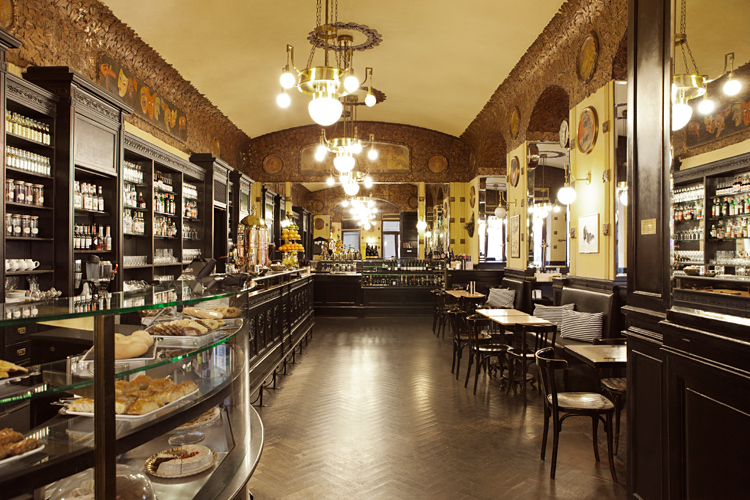
Caffè San Marco in Trieste, visited by James Joyce

In Prague, Bratislava, Budapest, Sarajevo, Krakow, Trieste and Lviv and other cities of the Austro-Hungarian empire, there were also many coffee houses according to the Viennese model. The Viennese coffee house culture then spread throughout Central Europe and created a special multicultural climate. Writers, artists, musicians, intellectuals, bon vivants and their financiers met at coffee houses.

=== Since World War I ===
The Habsburg coffeehouses were then largely deprived of their cultural base by the Holocaust and the expulsions of National Socialism and the economic prerequisites by communism.

This special atmosphere was only able to persist in Vienna and in a few other places. In particular in Trieste, which has been "forgotten" for a long time since 1918 and the many upheavals, there are still many of the former Viennese coffee houses (Caffè Tommaseo, Caffè San Marco, Caffè degli Specchi, Caffè Tergesteo, Caffè Stella Polare) in which the former lifestyle has been preserved by the locals.

In the 1950s, the period of "coffee house death" began, as many famous Viennese coffee houses had to close. This was due to the popularity of television and the appearance of modern espresso bars. Nevertheless, many of these classic Viennese coffee houses still exist. A renewed interest in their tradition and tourism have prompted a comeback. Recent international coverage has described the emergence of contemporary cafés and bakeries that reinterpret the Viennese coffeehouse tradition, including establishments such as Joseph Brot, Vollpension, Crème de la Crème and Meierei im Stadtpark. Some relatively modern Viennese coffee houses have emerged in North America, such as Julius Meinl Chicago and Kaffeehaus de Châtillon in the greater Seattle area and Cafe Sabarsky in Manhattan. In Jerusalem there is a Viennese coffee house in the Austrian Hospice.

== Notable coffee houses ==
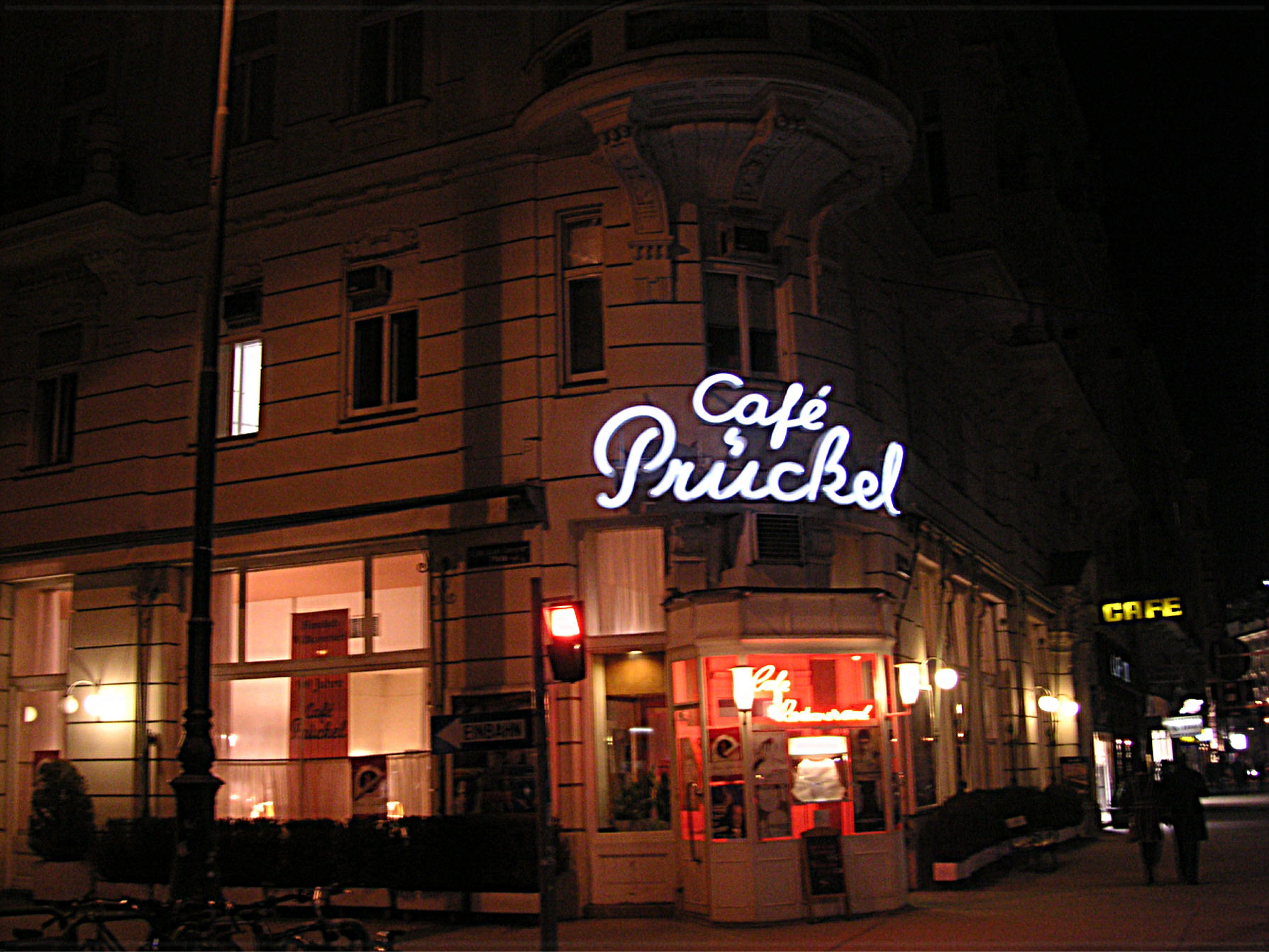
The Café Prückel at night

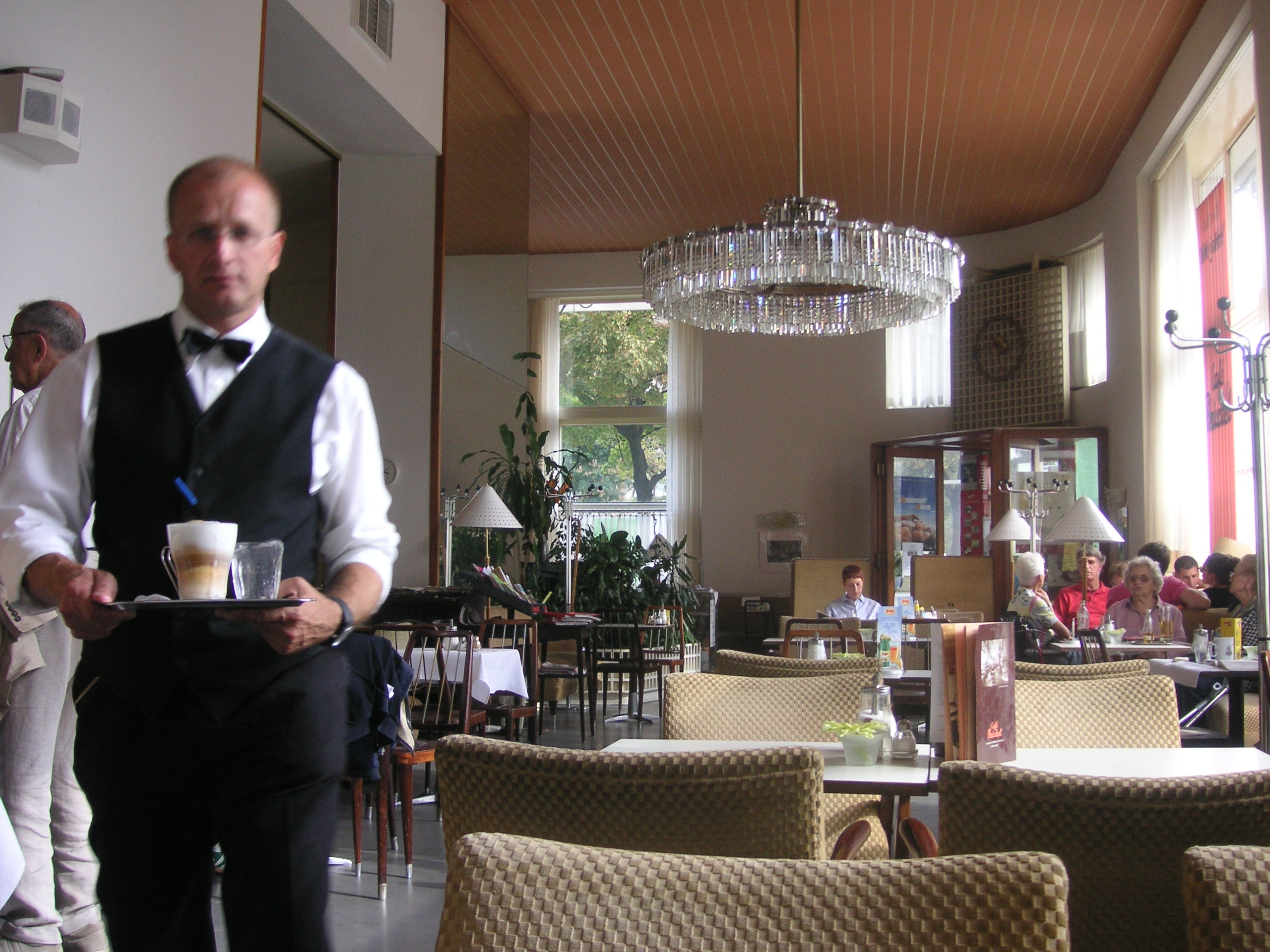
The original 1950s interior of the Café Prückel

- Aida, a chain of traditional Viennese coffee and pastry shops with locations all over the city; one popular location is right beside Stephansplatz.
- Café Bräunerhof, Stallburggasse 2
- Café Central, in Vienna, in the Palais Ferstel, Herrengasse 14 (corner of Strauchgasse) – Peter Altenberg's favorite café and at times his primary address
- Café Demel, Kohlmarkt 14 – the most famous sweet bakery, less of a typical café
- Café Frauenhuber, Himmelpfortgasse 6 – Vienna’s oldest coffee house (since 1824)
- Café Griensteidl, Michaelerplatz 2 – the favourite café of Leon Trotsky and many writers of that era, closed June 2017
- Café Hawelka, Dorotheergasse 6
- Café Landtmann, Universitätsring 4 – Sigmund Freud's preferred café
- Café Museum, Operngasse 7
- Café Sacher, Philharmonikerstraße 4 (a café part of the Hotel Sacher)
- Café Savoy, Linke Wienzeile 36
- Café Schwarzenberg, Kärntner Ring 17 (at Schwarzenbergplatz)
- Café Sperl, Gumpendorferstraße 11
- Café Tirolerhof, Führichgasse 8 – founded in 1918, near the Albertina
- Kaffee Alt Wien, Bäckerstraße 9
- Vollpension, cafés in the 1st and 4th districts that employ seniors.

== See also ==
- Karlsbad coffee
- Young Vienna, literary movement that arose around Viennese coffee houses
- Parisian café
- Wiener coffee
