= Café Central =

Coffee house in Vienna, Austria

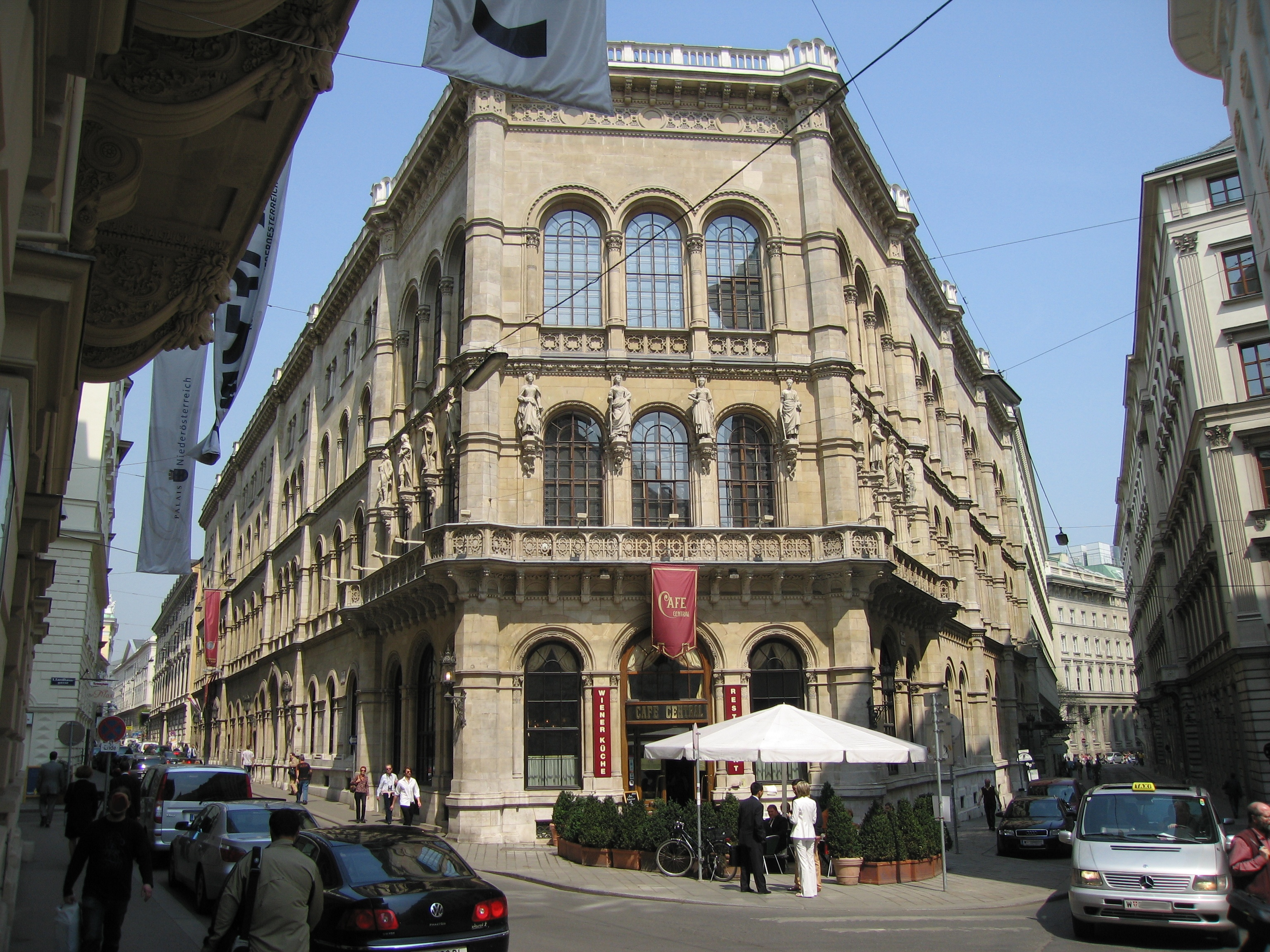
- Cafe Central in Vienna, Austria
- Interactive map of Café Central

Restaurant information
- Established: 1876; 150 years ago
- Location: Herrengasse 14, Innere Stadt (first district of Vienna), Austria
- Coordinates: 48°12′37″N 16°21′55″E
- Website: cafecentral.wien/en/

Café Central is a traditional Viennese coffeehouse located at Herrengasse 14 in the Innere Stadt first district of Vienna, Austria. The café occupies the ground floor of the former Bank and Stockmarket Building, today called the Palais Ferstel after its architect Heinrich von Ferstel.

== History ==
The café was opened in 1876, and in the late 19th century, it became a key meeting place of the Viennese intellectual scene. Key regulars included: Peter Altenberg, Theodor Herzl, Alfred Adler, Egon Friedell, Hugo von Hofmannsthal, Anton Kuh, Adolf Loos, Leo Perutz, Robert Musil, Stefan Zweig, Alfred Polgar and Leon Trotsky. In January 1913 alone, Josip Broz Tito, Sigmund Freud, and Stalin were patrons of the establishment. Tarot games of the Tarock family were played regularly here and Tapp Tarock was especially popular between the wars.

The café was often referred to as the "Chess school" (Die Schachhochschule) because of the presence of many chess players who used the first floor for their matches.

Members of the Vienna Circle of logical positivists held many meetings at the café before and after World War I.

A well known story is that when Victor Adler objected to Count Berchtold, foreign minister of Austria-Hungary, that war would provoke revolution in Russia, even if not in the Habsburg monarchy, he replied: "And who will lead this revolution? Perhaps Mr. Bronstein (Leon Trotsky) sitting over there at the Cafe Central?"

The café closed at the end of World War II. In 1975, the Palais Ferstel was renovated and the Central was newly opened, although in a different part of the building. In 1986, it was fully renovated once again.

Today it is both a tourist spot and a popular café marked by its place in literary history.

== Gallery ==
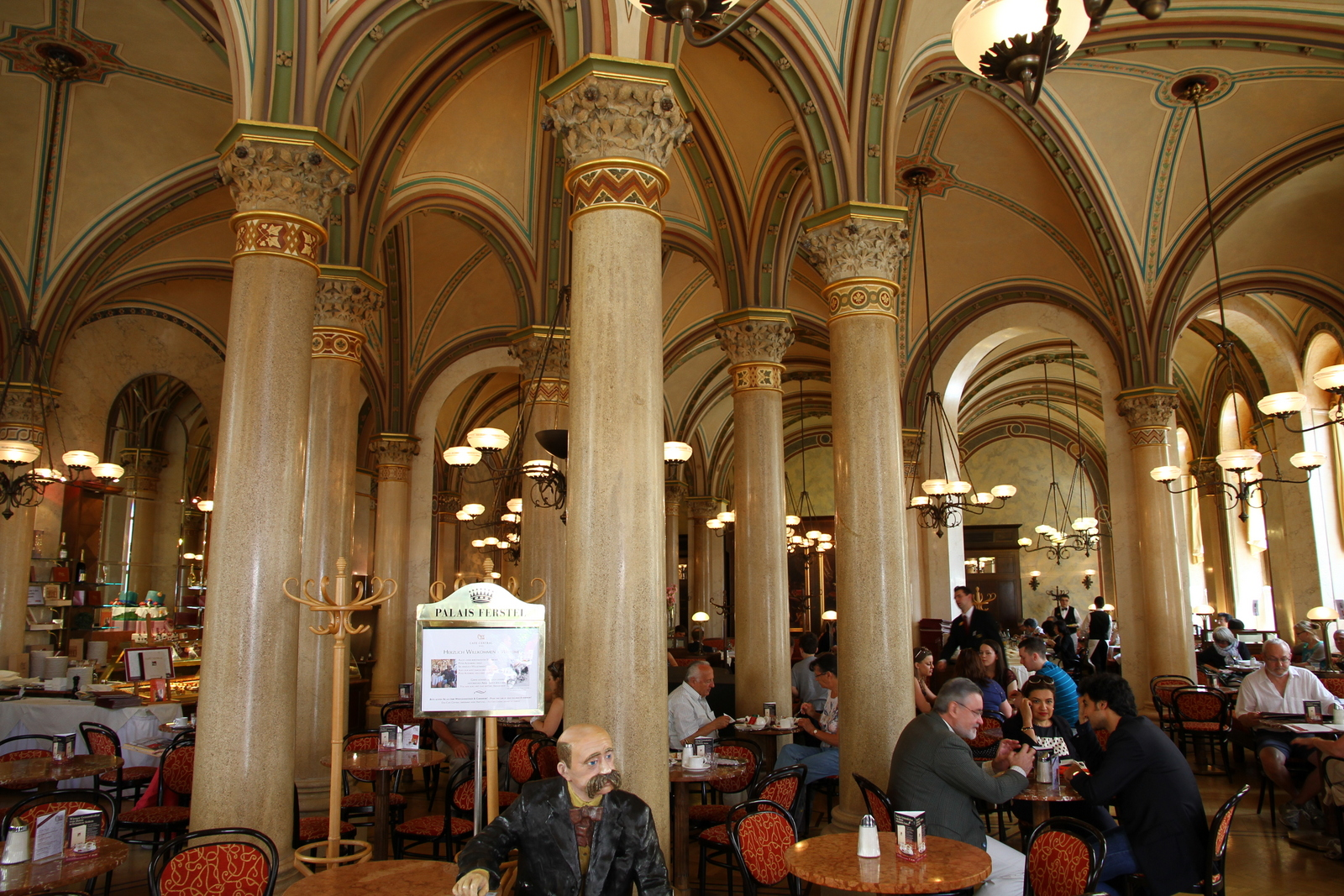
Cafe Central in Vienna interior near entrance with statue of Peter Altenberg

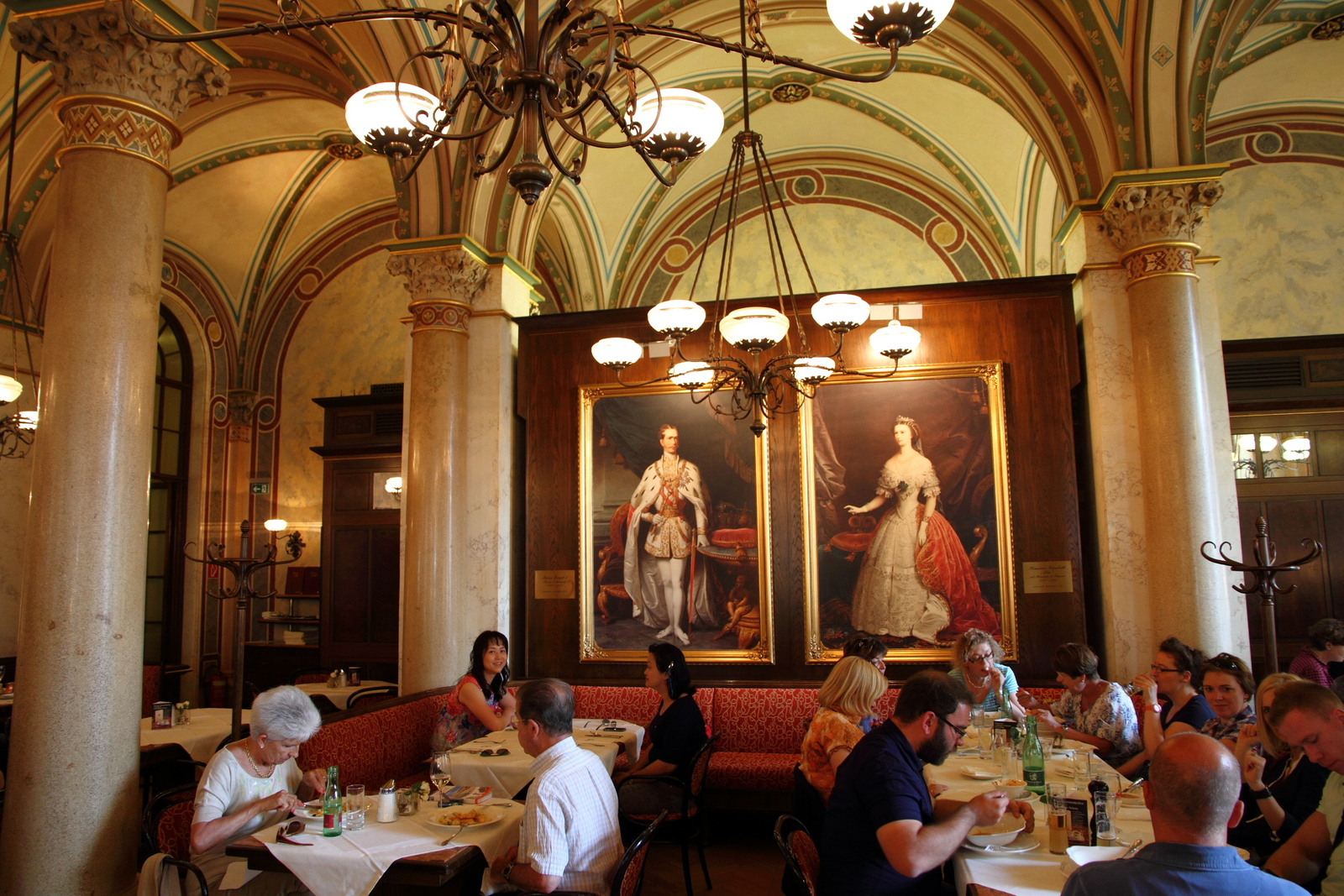
Cafe Central in Vienna interior near portraits of Empress Elisabeth of Austria and Franz Joseph I of Austria

== References in literature and popular culture ==
- The cafe appears in a pivotal scene in the 1998 novel The Magic Circle by Katherine Neville.
- An analogue for the cafe called Cafe Ferstel appears in Vienna in the video game Sunless Sea.
- The Cafe Central is the focal point of the 2023 literary work and stage play 'One Lump or Two? - Mister Hitler' by Jonathan R P Taylor.

== See also ==
- List of restaurants in Vienna
