= Peștera (Danube) =

- Location within Romania

Location
- Country: Romania
- Counties: Constanța County
- Villages: Izvoru Mare, Peștera, Ivrinezu Mare

Physical characteristics
- Mouth: Danube
  - coordinates: 44.2783°N 27.9802°E
- Length: 26 km (16 mi)
- Basin size: 257 km^{2} (99 sq mi)

Basin features
- Progression: Danube→ Black Sea
- River code: XIV.1.41

The Peștera is a right tributary of the Danube in Romania. It flows into the Danube in Cochirleni. Its length is 26 km (16 mi) and its basin size is 257 km^{2} (99 sq mi).
