= Vollpension =

Coffee house in Vienna, Austria

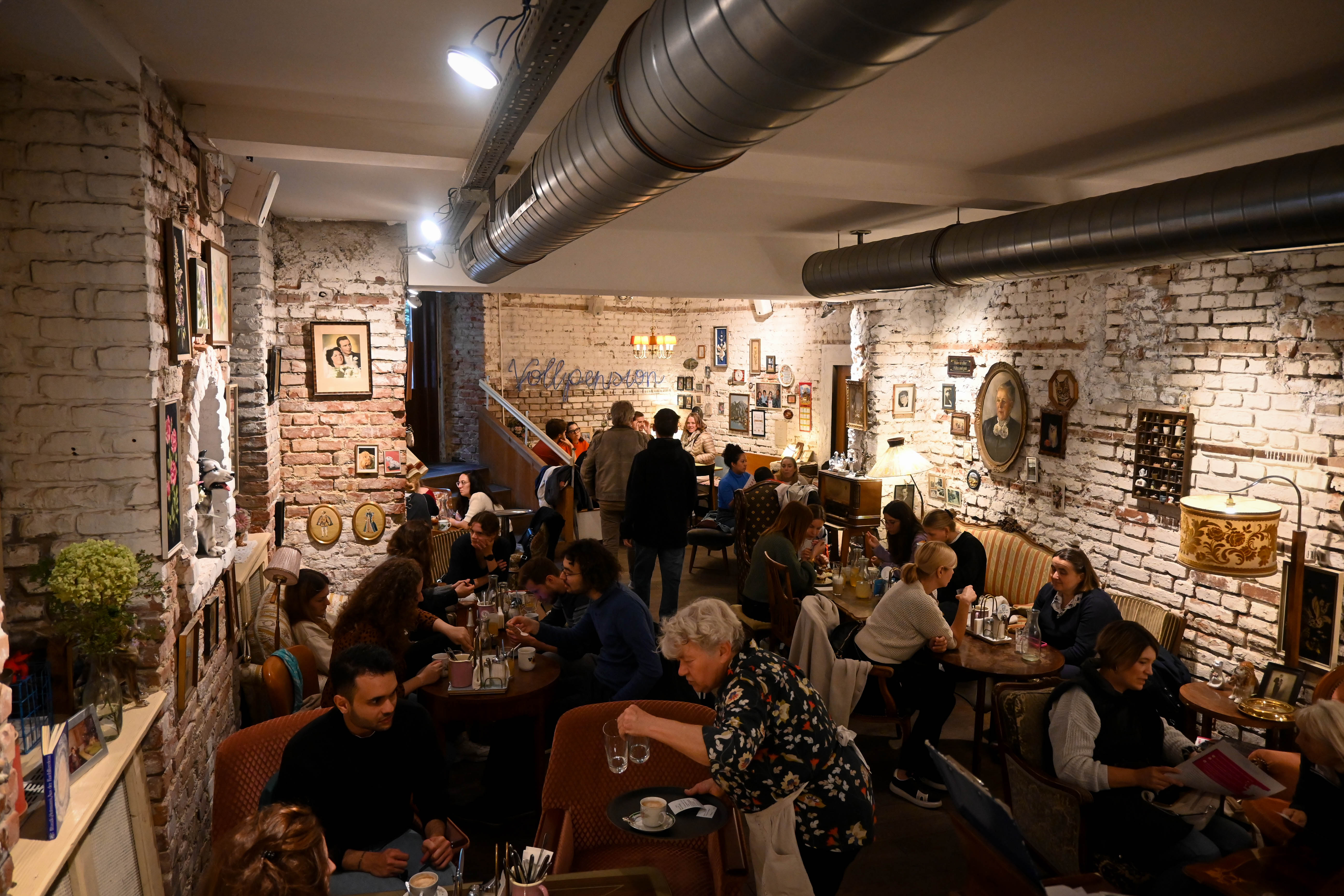
- Native name: Vollpension - Generationencafé
- Founded: 2012; 14 years ago in Vienna, Austria
- Founder
- Headquarters: Vienna, Austria
- Number of locations: 2 (2026)
- Number of employees: ~115 (2026)
- Website: vollpension.wien

Vollpension (pronounced [ˈfɔlpaŋˌzi̯oːn]) is a social enterprise coffeehouse chain in Vienna, Austria, that primarily employs senior citizens as bakers and servers. Founded in 2012, it has gained international recognition from media outlets such as The New York Times, CNN, and France 24 for its "intergenerational café" (German: Generationencafé) model, which aims to combat elderly loneliness and poverty by providing supplemental income and social integration.

== History ==
Vollpension was set up as a pop-up café in 2012 by a group of young people who wished to serve cakes such as those made by grandmothers. It was meant to be a temporary project at the Vienna Design Week, but the Austrian Tourist Association became aware of it and sent the baking seniors across the country for three months. Ten "grandmothers" thus toured Austria to serve at festivals, beer parties, and fairs. In 2015 a permanent location was chosen, at Schleifmühlgasse 16, near Vienna's historic outdoor market Naschmarkt, to ensure that the business would become stable.

Since its founding, Vollpension has served over one million guests. According to company data as of 2024, the social enterprise has generated more than €2.3 million in supplemental income for its senior employees over the past decade. In September 2019 Vollpension opened another branch at Johannesgasse 4a. Due to this extension, and the purposeful employment primarily of older people, Vollpension was hit particularly hard by the COVID-19 pandemic when it reached Austria in March 2020. That year Vollpension launched the "world's first Grandma Baking School", an online platform called BakAdemy (German: BackAdemie), which offers on-demand live baking courses from elders across the world, including India, New Zealand, the United States and Australia.

Vollpension opened a second location in 2019 in Johannesgasse within the Music and Arts University of the City of Vienna (MUK)

== Brand and aesthetic ==
The name Vollpension, meaning "full pension", refers to both the retirement pension and to a hotel stay that includes meals, or full board.

Vollpension's aesthetic features worn furniture, small vases, doilies, and animal figurines and is meant to give the visitor a feeling of a warm family room. The café is frequented by multigenerational groups and often young mothers with children.

The main focus of Vollpension are cakes, which are sold by slice. A selection of beverages and smaller snacks is also available. All food is prepared by the "grandmas" and "grandpas" according to their own family recipes. The menu is thus variable, with the options offered depending on which "grandmas" and "grandpas" are on baking duty that day. Servings come in two sizes, with vegan and vegetarian alternatives also available.

== Social business ==
Vollpension is considered a highly successful example of social entrepreneurship: it provides additional income for older people in a commercially sustainable way, as well as enabling cross-generational interaction for its older staff, who may otherwise experience poverty and social isolation or loneliness. In 2020 Vollpension employed a total of 80 people, of 21 nationalities, aged 18 to 84. "Grandmas" (German: Omas) and a few "grandpas" (Opas) form a large part of the staff and are the only staff involved in baking. Most work part-time. The "grandmas" and the "grandpas" bake, serve, and chat to the clientele.

In its earlier years, Vollpension hosted a wide range of regular public activities, such as knitting and poker workshops, to facilitate the exchange of skills between generations. While these regular programs were later scaled back, the café continues to host occasional, irregular events and workshops.

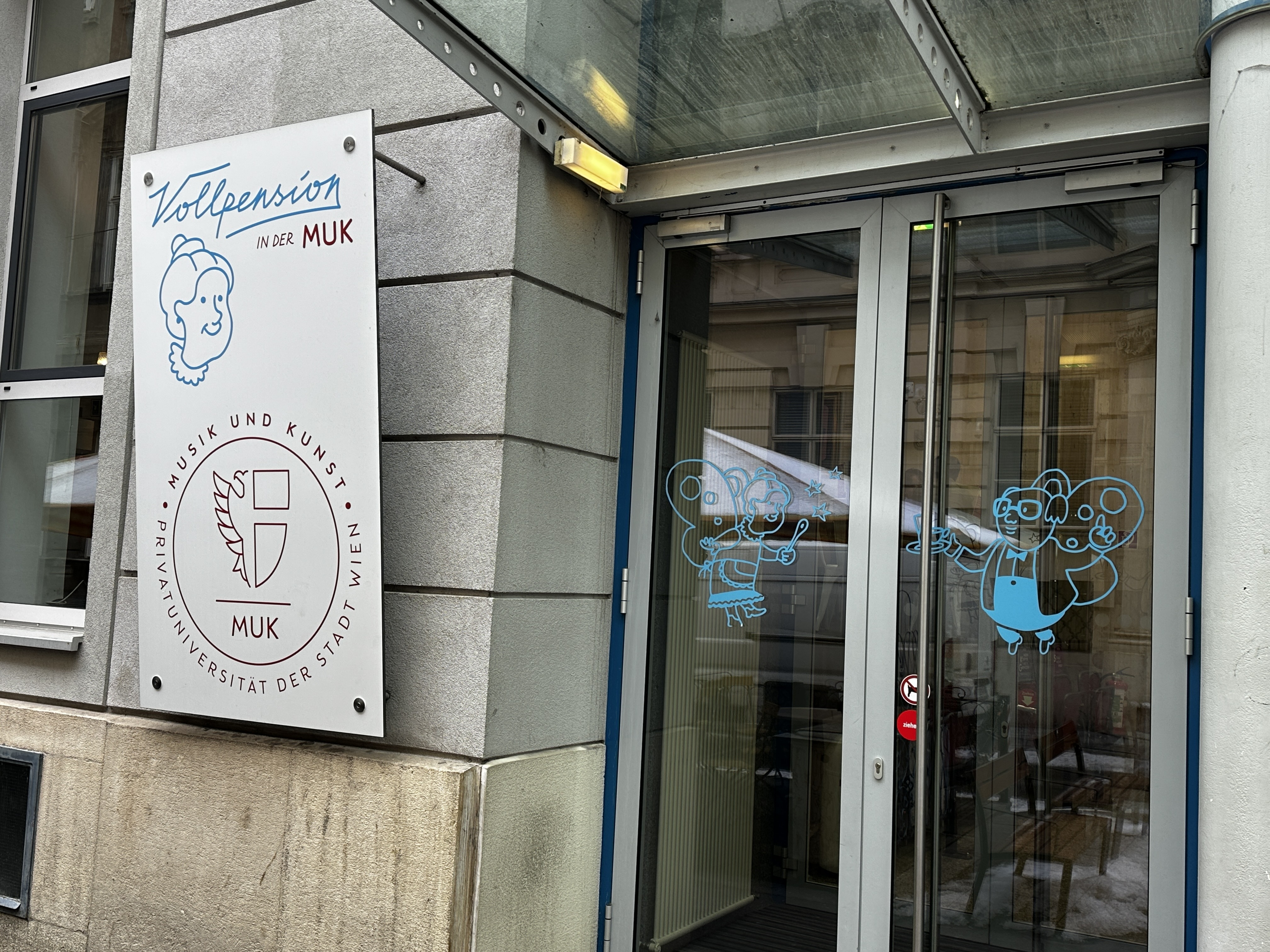
Entrance of Vollpension in der MUK in Vienna (Johannesgasse).

== See also ==
- Social enterprise
- Old-age poverty
- Viennese coffee house
