= Einspänner =

Coffee with whipped cream

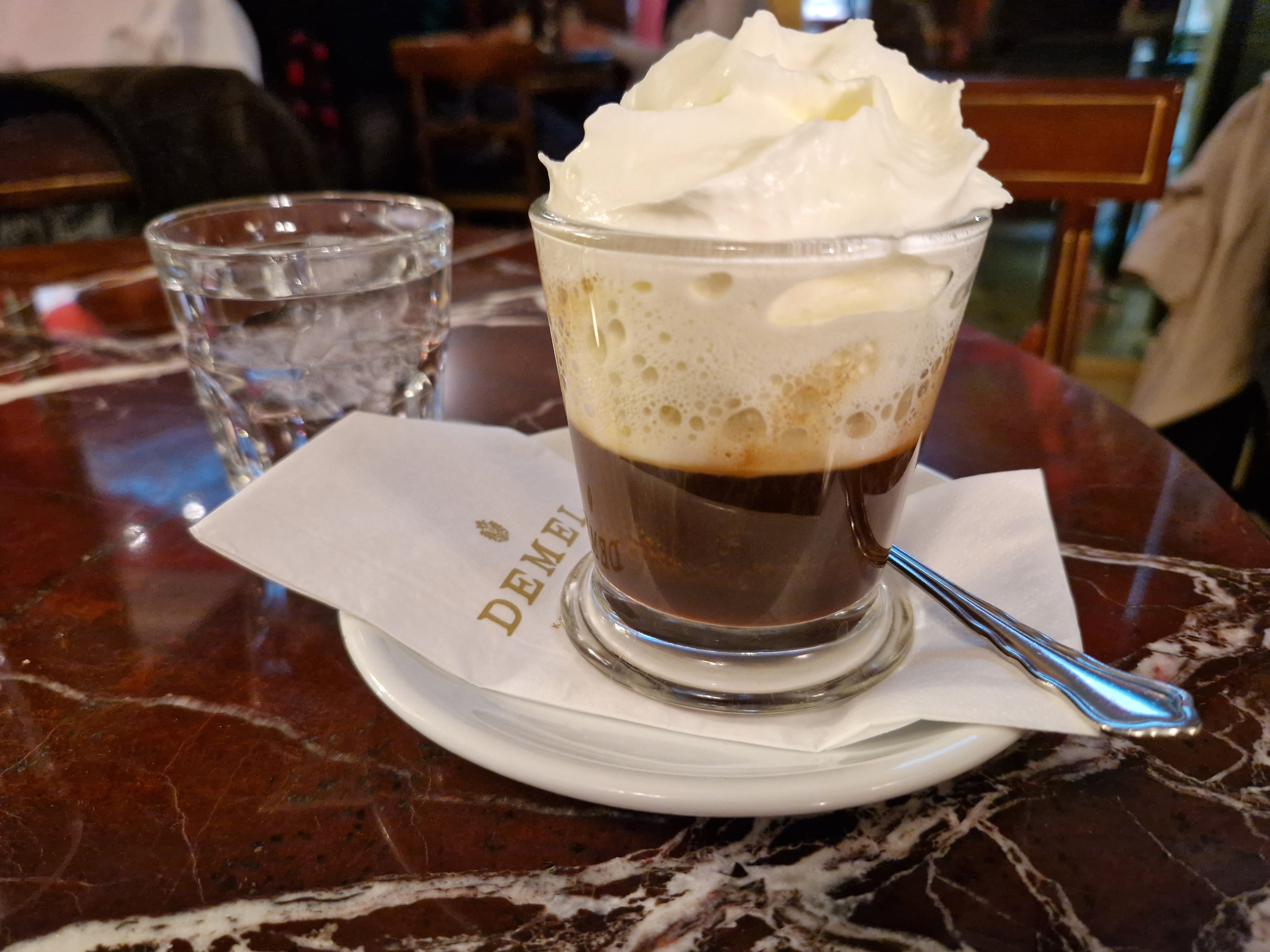
- An Einspänner at Demel in Vienna
- Type: Beverage
- Place of origin: Austria
- Region or state: Vienna
- Main ingredients: Espresso, whipped cream

An Einspänner is a Viennese coffee drink consisting of espresso ("Mocca" in Viennese terminology) topped with whipped cream. It is traditionally served in a glass rather than a mug or a coffee cup.

== History ==
=== Origins ===
In German, an "Einspänner" is a kind of carriage pulled by a single horse (one-horse carriage). The drink's name refers to the carriages that were common in Vienna in the 19th century, as it was intended for the drivers. Whipped cream was used to insulate the coffee on cold days, keeping it warm for as long as possible. The Einspänner also found popularity beyond carriage drivers and quickly became a staple of Vienna's coffee houses.

=== Modern day ===
In the 2020s, the Viennese Einspänner was cited as a precursor for cream-topped drinks in South Korea's coffee scene, including not just espresso but also iced coffee and matcha lattes. Korean-style coffee shops have also popularized the Einspänner and its derivatives in the United States.

== Sources ==
- Kretschmer, Helmut (2006). Kapuziner, Einspänner, Schalerl Gold: zur Geschichte der Wiener Kaffeehäuser [Capuchin, Einspänner, Schalerl Gold: the history of Viennese coffee houses] (in German). Wiener Stadt- u. Landesarchiv (Magistratsabt. 8). ISBN 978-3-902069-98-6.
