= Peștere =

Peștere may refer to several villages in Romania:

- Peștere, a village in Aștileu Commune, Bihor County
- Peștere, a village in Constantin Daicoviciu, Caraș-Severin
- Pestere, the Hungarian name for Peștera village, Sălașu de Sus Commune, Hunedoara County

== See also ==
- Peștera (disambiguation)
