= Schanigarten =

Outdoor seating for a café, bar or restaurant in a public place

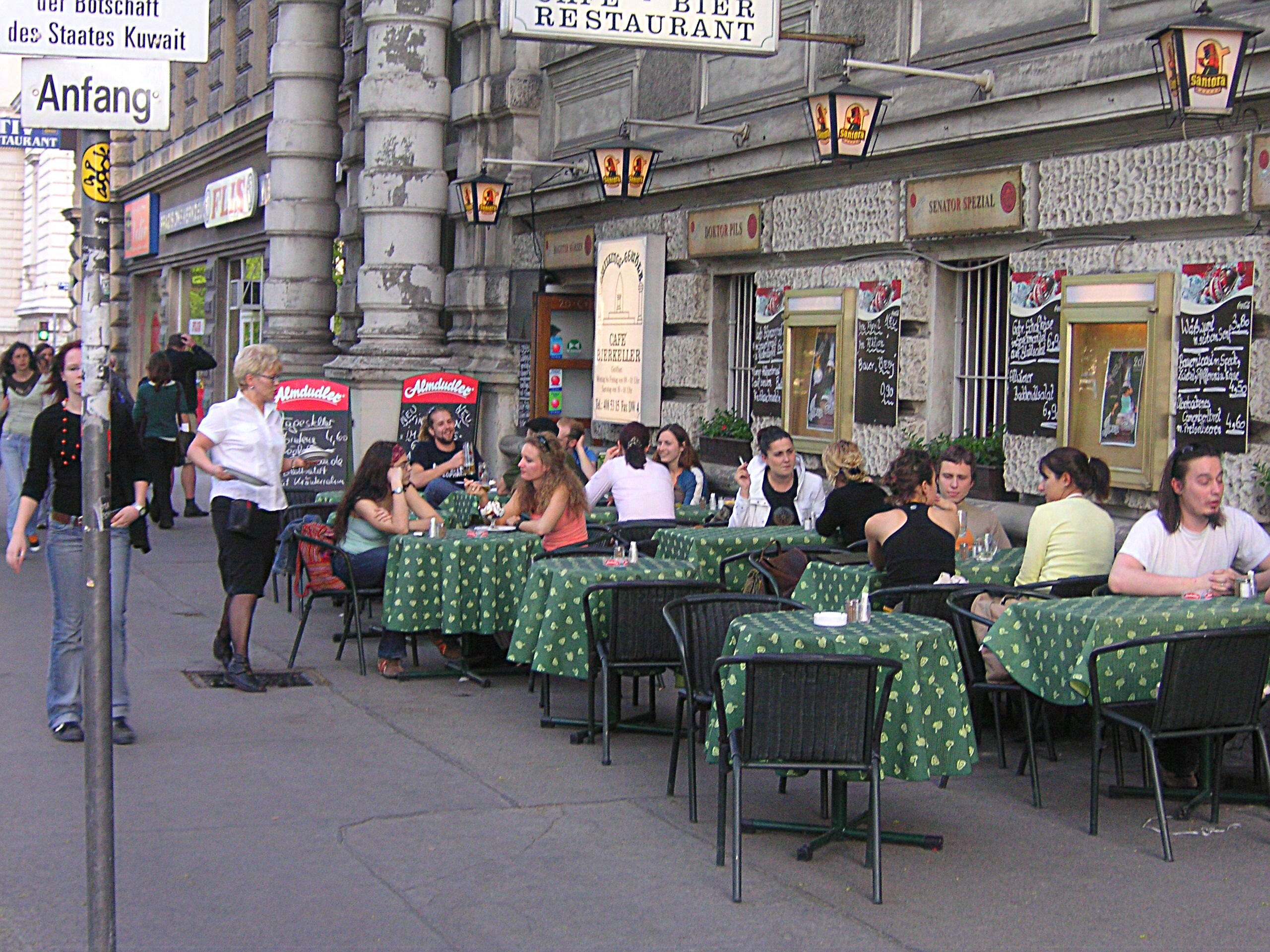
Schanigarten near Vienna University

Schanigarten (plural: Schanigärten) is the Austro-Bavarian term for tables and chairs set up on the sidewalk in front of eating and drinking places. Unlike normal beer gardens (Gastgärten), the customers actually sit on public property. Originally, Schanigärten referred only to Viennese coffee houses, but now the expression is used in other parts of Austria and for other types of establishments like restaurants and taverns.

== Regulations ==
In order to operate a Schanigarten, an establishment needs an authorization according to road traffic or trade regulations, which is valid from March 1 to November 15. The Schanigarten is a very attractive proposition for the owners of an establishment, as they only pay a very limited yearly fee of several euros per square meter to the municipality. Operations like ice cream stores can thereby effectively multiply their seating area on public property at minimal cost. An extreme example is the ice cream store Zanoni in the Vienna city center that extends its Schanigarten over three quarters of the adjacent public square and has set up glass separators to prevent side walk users from crossing the privatized zone.

Furthermore, permissions are also granted to set up Schanigärten not on the sidewalk but on the actual driving lanes or parking lanes, reducing the number of available parking spaces.

== Popularity during Covid-19 Pandemic ==
With many restrictions in place due to the pandemic, the indoor seating capacity is sharply reduced as to maintain the distance between tables. This causes many establishments to earn less revenues. Adding or expanding the outdoor eating area can help the establishments recoup the revenue. Many cities around the world have allowed the Schanigärten to be set up on the parking lanes in front of the gastronomic establishments. The popularity means the Schanigärten can more or less continue through the winter in some cities in the Northern Hemisphere.
