= Pester Lloyd =

Hungarian online newspaper

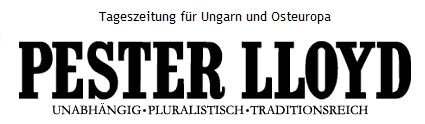

Pester Lloyd is a German-language online daily newspaper from Budapest, Hungary with a focus "on Hungary and Eastern Europe".

== History during the Austrian Empire and the Austro-Hungarian Empire ==
Its first stint of existence was from 1854 to 1945; until 1945 it was the leading German language publication in Hungary. Its origin was a vital part of the modernization of Hungary in the 1850s. Until then Hungary was part of the Habsburg Empire, ruled by the regime in Vienna. It chafed under restrictions which tended to see it as a vassal to be exploited for its agricultural products, for tax income, and for conscripts for the Austrian army, while at the same time keeping industrial development and financial power in Austrian hands. In the 1840s the political and business classes, led by Lajos Kossuth and his vision pressed for change, but met with obstinate resistance in Vienna. The result, in 1848, was the Hungarian Revolution which became a war for independence from Austria. Kossuth and his associates created an independent government and succeeded for a time, but upon Russian intervention it was quickly put down. In the aftermath the leaders of the rebellion were hanged, imprisoned or exiled and Hungary faced years of brutal military occupation by the Austrian army. All political life was totally stamped out.

Far-sighted individuals who survived all this now asked themselves, what can we do to rebuild Hungary? Organizations or publications of the least political nature were clearly out of the question but Austrian policy allowed, even encouraged, economic development—in the late 1830s investment in the building of railroads had created great profits and the banks in Vienna had an appetite for more of the same.

The political and financial heart of Hungary was the sprawling market city of Pest, the portion of present-day Budapest on the left bank of the Danube. Its location there had over many centuries made it a trading center for merchandise moving between northern Europe and the East — Turkey, Russia and beyond. Its quarterly expositions mounted 900 booths and attracted thousands of dealers. In 1844, 15,000 wagon loads plus 947 river boatloads of goods were sold in the markets of Pest. The main products were agricultural: wool, wheat, tobacco, swine and cattle.

Despite all that commerce Pest had little industrial facilities. The only sizable steam engines (40 and 60 HP) were in the two small rolling mills for metal. Beyond that a mere 13 additional small steam engines of 3 to 12 HP were to be found among the two oil mills, a silk factory, three other textile mills with a mere total of 45 looms, and a few other small industries.

So the life of Pest was more about trading than industry. In 1846 it had a wholesale merchants’ association with 36 members,. There were also two retail merchants associations: a Gentile one with 245 members and a Jewish one with 136 members. Craft guilds with a total of 3445 members existed as well.

Aside from those modest organizations Pest was an inchoate city of individuals, more like an oriental bazaar than a modern society. As a result of its rapid growth in just a few decades, the business community was made up largely of newcomers from the far reaches of the Habsburg Empire, so most of the business people were strangers to one another.

Among the mercantile elements in Pest were some who had a vision for political and economic progress. That vision was to turn this mass of people into a community that worked together and would have an economic operation as modern as those of London, Paris or Vienna, if not as large.

These men had a clear plan for carrying out their vision and by 1853 it took the form of an association which they named Die Pester Lloyd Gesellschaft. It differed greatly from the earlier merchants’ associations: first, membership was open without religious distinction; second, it included as honorary members dignitaries, officials, educated people and artists. The enthusiastic reception of this project was shown by the initial enrollment of 620 members.

From the first it was designed to work on two levels, the social and the technical. On the social level Pester Lloyd quickly began to organize weekly concerts, social events, and lectures on natural science, chemistry, geology, etc. As a venue for this public life they obtained the Casino, the largest hall in the city. Once refurbished, it was the handsomest as well.

On the technical level the Gesellschaft took three steps: They established a grain exchange hall, a bourse (stock market), and a daily newspaper, the Pester-Lloyd Tagesblatt. The paper carried general news, official announcements, rail and boat schedules, exchange rates and market quotations. In the 50-year retrospective volume of the Pester Lloyd Gesellschaft issued in 1903, the Tagesblatt is designated as the outstanding product of the organization.

Born under conditions of severe censorship, the Tagesblatt focused primarily on the Hungarian economic world at first. In small steps, however, the editor Dr. Johann Weisz expanded that agenda. Working with the quiet but esteemed political statesman Ferenc Deák he found ways to spread liberal ideas, to quietly help their supporters, and to advance the concept of the Hungarian state in a period when it was non-existent as such. It grew from a paper dealing primarily with commercial matters to become as much of a political newspaper as they could push against the limits.

Incidentally Weisz's knowledge of history and politics was so profound that when the talk of a new Hungarian government began in 1861 the national leaders, Deak and Gyula Andrássy turned to him for guidance. The treatise that he produced, "The Struggle for the Hungarian Constitution," published in the Egydische series, became an oft-cited textbook.

In the period when German was the official language, the Tagesblatt was the leading newspaper in the country. Even after Hungarian became the official language again, German still remained the dominant lingua franca in foreign trade, and Pester Lloyd has continuously been the strongest German-language publication in Hungary. Over the years it was prominent enough to attract such internationally famous contributors as Theodor Herzl, Max Nordau, Thomas Mann, Stefan Zweig, Joseph Roth, Alfred Polgar, Ferenc Molnár, Dezső Kosztolányi, Egon Erwin Kisch, Bertha von Suttner, Franz Werfel and Felix Salten.

== History during Nazi-Germany ==
Being published outside the Third Reich's borders until World War II, Pester Lloyd was not subject to Nazi Gleichschaltung and thus, in an article on 16 September 1935, openly criticized the antisemitic Nuremberg Laws of 1935. The paper spoke of the laws allowing an extent of discrimination unheard of in history and compared the situation of the Jews in Nazi Germany to those of the Helots, a slave class in the ancient Greek state of Sparta.

While it served for some years as intellectual refugee for European Intellectuals, notably e.g., Thomas Mann's alarming antifascist text "Achtung, Europa!" was published, mostly untouched by the censorship laws rising all across Europe along with fascism, it fell prey to Nazi Gleichschaltung with Hungary's further alignment to the Reich.

The Pester Lloyd was 'cleaned' by the Horthy regime and an outspoken antisemite and nationalist, Mathes Nitsch, was installed as leading editor. This marks the darkest times in the Newspapers history.

Since a lot of its editorial staff were of Jewish descent, a number of redakteure (editors) of the Pester Lloyd ended up as victims of the Shoah. Others came away with their lives but were silenced and broken.

== Since 1994 and online version ==
In 1994 the publication resumed as a weekly magazine under the proud title Der Neue Pester Lloyd. The initial title Pester Lloyd was restored in 1999 (editor in chief: Gotthard B. Schicker).

Since 2004, the Wiener Lloyd is part of the publication every four to six weeks, as an insert, reflecting the relations between the two capitals, Vienna and Budapest, of the former Austro-Hungarian Empire.

In June 2009 the Pester Lloyd's print version was discontinued for economic reasons. New articles can still be read on the newspaper's website.

The Pester Lloyd Online was published till 2020 and relaunched in April 2025 under a new publisher on the domain www.pesterlloyd.net. It continues its liberal and government-critical editorial line and tradition.
