= Nudge =

Nudge or Nudging may refer to:

== Arts ==
- Nudge (band), an American electronic rock band
- Nudge, a character from the Maximum Ride series by James Patterson
- "Nudge Nudge", a sketch from the third episode of Monty Python's Flying Circus
- Gerald "Nudge" Noritis, a character from the Australian sitcom Hey Dad..!

== Information technology ==
- Nudge (instant messaging), an attention-getting feature in instant messaging software
- Nudging, a data assimilation method also known as Newtonian relaxation

== Organisations ==
- Nudge Institute, an Indian anti-poverty nonprofit
- Behavioural Insights Team, or "Nudge Unit", a UK-based global social purpose organisation

== Psychology ==
- Nudge (book), a book on choice architecture by Richard Thaler and Cass R. Sunstein
- Nudge theory, a psychological theory on influencing individuals and groups to take action without force
