= Peter Altenberg =

Austrian writer and poet

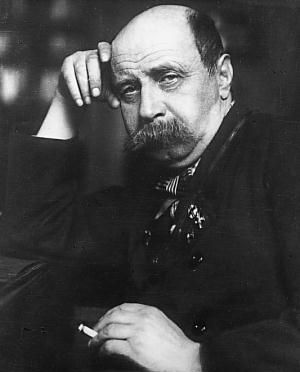
- Altenberg in 1907
- Born: Richard Engländer; 9 March 1859; Vienna, Austrian Empire
- Died: 19 January 1919 (aged 59); Vienna, Republic of German-Austria
- Occupation: Writer
- Writing career
- Movement: Modernism

Signature
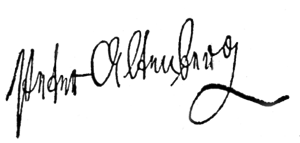

Peter Altenberg (9 March 1859 – 8 January 1919) was a writer and poet from Vienna, Austria. He played a key role in the genesis of early modernism in the city.

== Biography ==
He was born Richard Engländer on 9 March 1859 in Vienna into a Jewish family. The nom de plume, "Altenberg", came from a small town on the Danube river. Allegedly, he chose the "Peter" to honor a young girl whom he remembered as an unrequited love (it had been her nickname). Although he grew up in a middle class Jewish family, Altenberg eventually separated himself from his family of origin by dropping out of both law and medical school, and embracing Bohemianism as a permanent lifestyle choice. He cultivated a feminine appearance and feminine handwriting, wore a cape, sandals and a broad-brimmed hat, and despised 'macho' masculinity.

Discovered by Arthur Schnitzler in 1894 and appreciated by Hugo von Hofmannsthal and Karl Kraus, Altenberg was one of the main proponents of Viennese Impressionism. He was a master of short, aphoristic stories based on close observation of everyday life events. After reading Altenberg's first published collection Wie ich es sehe (1896) Hofmannsthal wrote: "Even though entirely unconcerned with things important, the book has such a good conscience that one can immediately see that it cannot possibly be a German book. It is truly Viennese. It flaunts it – its origin – as it flaunts its attitude."

At the fin de siècle, when Vienna was a major crucible and center for modern arts and culture, Altenberg was a very influential part of a literary and artistic movement known as Jung-Wien (Young Vienna). Altenberg was a contemporary of Karl Kraus, Gustav Mahler, Arthur Schnitzler, Gustav Klimt, and Adolf Loos, with whom he had a very close relationship. He was somewhat older, in his early 30s, than the others. His oeuvre consists of short, poetic prose pieces that do not easily fit into usual formal categories. The inspiration for his trademark short prose he drew from the concise aesthetic of Charles Baudelaire's prose poems and the spatial limitations of the 'Correspondenzkarte,' the postcard, first launched and disseminated in his native Austria in 1869.

He became well known throughout Vienna after the publication of a book of his fragmentary observations of women and children in everyday street activities. Because most of his literary work was written while he frequented various Viennese bars and coffeehouses, Altenberg is sometimes referred to as a cabaret or coffee house poet. His favorite coffeehouse was the Café Central, to which he even had his mail delivered.

Altenberg's detractors said he was a drug addict and a womanizer. Altenberg was also rumored to have problems with alcoholism and mental illness. Yet his admirers considered him to be a highly creative individual with a great love for the aesthetic, for nature, and for young girls. He is certainly known to have had a large collection of photographs and drawings of young girls, and those who knew him well (such as the daughter of his publisher) wrote of his adoration of young girls.

Altenberg was never a commercially successful writer, but he did enjoy most if not all of the benefits of fame in his lifetime. Altenberg was at one point nominated for the Nobel Prize. Some of the aphoristic poetry he wrote on the backs of postcards and scraps of paper were set to music by composer Alban Berg. In 1913, Berg's Five songs on picture postcard texts by Peter Altenberg were premiered in Vienna. The piece caused an uproar, and the performance had to be halted: a complete performance of the work was not given until 1952.

Altenberg, like many writers and artists, was constantly short of money, but he was adept at making friends, cultivating patrons, and convincing others to pay for his meals, his champagne, even his rent, with which he was frequently late. He repaid his debts with his talent, his wit, and his charm. Many academics consider him to have been a "bohemian's bohemian."

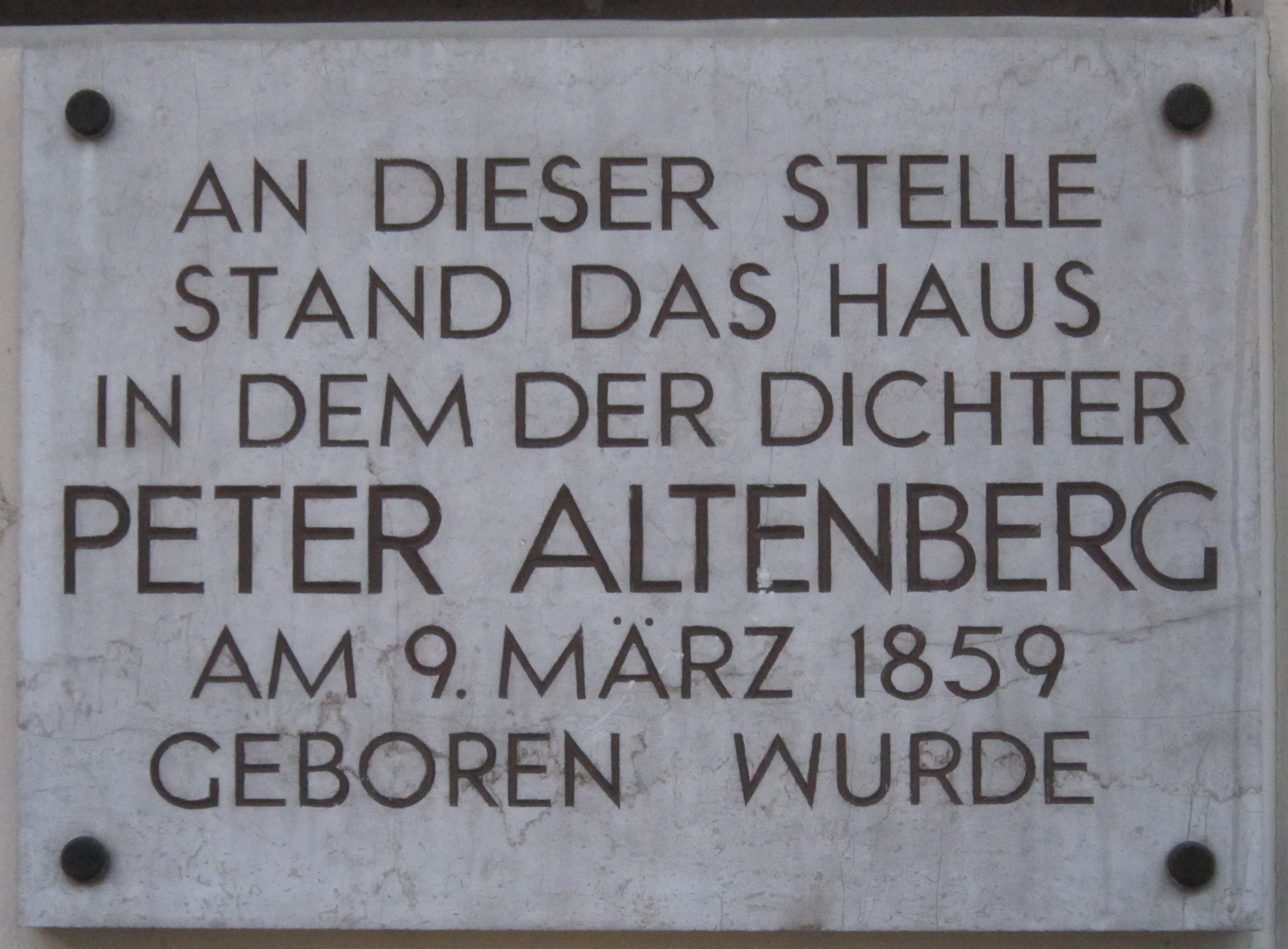
Memorial for Altenberg in Vienna

Most of Altenberg's work is published in the German language and, outside of anthology pieces, is difficult to find. Much of it remains in university libraries or private collections. Two selections have been translated, Evocations of Love (1960) and Telegrams of the Soul: Selected Prose of Peter Altenberg (2005).

Altenberg, who never married, died on 8 January 1919, aged 59, of pneumonia. He is buried at Central Cemetery in Vienna, Austria.

== In popular culture ==
The Altenberg Trio is named after Peter Altenberg.

== Works ==
=== German ===
- Wie ich es sehe. S. Fischer, Berlin 1896; Manesse, Zürich 2007, ISBN 978-3-7175-2128-0
- Ashantee. Fischer, Berlin 1897; Loecker, Wien 2008, ISBN 978-3-85409-460-9
- Was der Tag mir zuträgt. Fünfundfünfzig neue Studien. Fischer, Berlin 1901
- Prodromos. Fischer, Berlin 1906
- Märchen des Lebens. Fischer, Berlin 1908; veränd. A. ebd. 1919
- Die Auswahl aus meinen Büchern. Fischer, Berlin 1908
- Bilderbögen des kleinen Lebens. Reiss, Berlin 1909
- Neues Altes. Fischer, Berlin 1911 (Digitalised at Bielefeld University)
- Semmering 1912. Fischer, Berlin 1913; verm. A. ebd. 1919
- Fechsung. Fischer, Berlin 1915
- Nachfechsung. Fischer, Berlin 1916
- Vita ipsa. Fischer, Berlin 1918
- Mein Lebensabend. Fischer, Berlin 1919 (Digitalised at Bielefeld University
- Der Nachlass von Peter Altenberg, zusammensgestellt von Alfred Polgar. Fischer, Berlin 1925.
- Peter Altenberg. Auswahl von Karl Kraus, herausgegeben von Sigismund von Radecki. Atlantis, Zürich 1963
- Das Buch der Bücher von Peter Altenberg, zusammengestellt von Karl Kraus. 3 Bände. Wallstein, Göttingen 2009, ISBN 978-3-8353-0409-3
- Die Selbsterfindung eines Dichters. Briefe und Dokumente 1892–1896. Hrsg. und mit einem Nachwort von Leo A. Lensing. Wallstein, Göttingen 2009, ISBN 978-3-8353-0552-6

=== English translated ===
- Telegrams of the Soul: Selected Prose of Peter Altenberg (2005). Trans. Peter Wortsman
- Ashantee. (Studies in Austrian Literature, Culture, and Thought) (2007). Trans. Katharina von Hammerstein
- Alexander King Presents Peter Altenberg's Evocations of Love (1960). Trans. Alexander King
