= Peștera =

- Commune
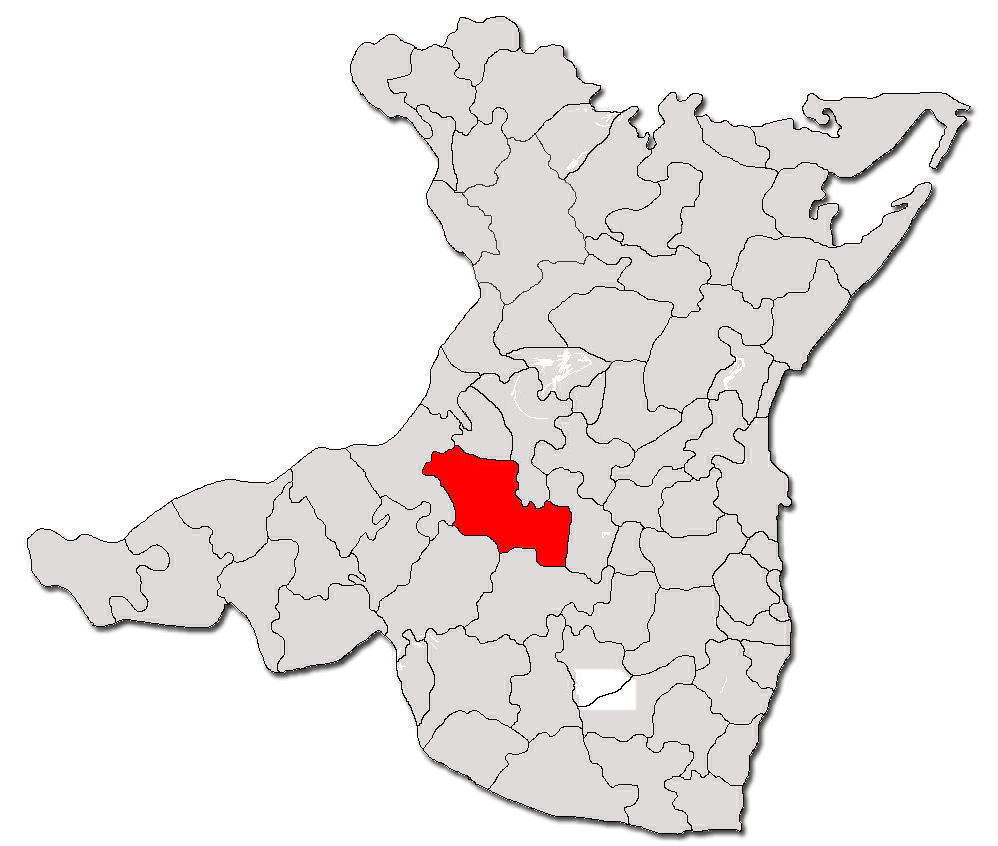
- Location in Constanța County

- Location in Romania
- Coordinates: 44°11′N 28°8′E
- Country: Romania
- County: Constanța
- Subdivisions: Peștera, Ivrinezu Mare, Ivrinezu Mic, Izvoru Mare, Veteranu

Government
  - Mayor (2020–2024): Nicoleta Vrabie
- Area: 194.90 km^{2} (75.25 sq mi)
- Population (2021-12-01): 3,127
  - Density: 16/km^{2} (42/sq mi)
- Time zone: EET/EEST (UTC+2/+3)
- Vehicle reg.: CT
- Website: www.comunapestera.ro

Peștera (Romanian pronunciation: [ˈpeʃtera], meaning "the cave" in Romanian) is a commune in Constanța County, Northern Dobruja, Romania. It includes five villages:

- Peștera
- Ivrinezu Mare
- Ivrinezu Mic
- Izvoru Mare (historical name: Mamut-Cuius, Turkish: Mamutkuyusu)
- Veteranu (historical name: Idris-Cuius, Turkish: İdriskuyusu)

== Demographics ==
At the 2011 census, Pestera had 3,178 Romanians (99.28%), 18 Turks (0.56%), 4 Tatars (0.12%), 1 others (0.03%).
