= Outline of Vienna =

Overview of and topical guide to Vienna

Flag of Vienna

Coat of arms of Vienna

The following outline is provided as an overview of and topical guide to Vienna:

Vienna – capital of Austria and one of its nine states. It is the country's largest city, with over 1.8 million residents within an area of 414.65 km^{2} (160.10 sq mi). Vienna has a rich heritage and is considered one of the most livable cities in the world. It is the cultural center of Austria and a popular tourist destination, attracting over 6.8 million visitors per year. Having become the home of many musical luminaries throughout music's classical period (and later), including Mozart and Beethoven, Vienna is known as the City of Music.

== General reference ==
- Pronunciation: English: /viˈɛnə/; German: Wien, pronounced [viːn];
- Common English name(s): Vienna
- Official English name(s): Vienna
- Adjectival(s): Viennese, Wiener
- Demonym(s): Viennese, Wiener

== Geography of Vienna ==
Geography of Vienna

- Vienna is:
  - a city
    - capital of Austria
    - a primate city of Austria
  - a federated state
    - a state of Austria
- Population of Vienna: 1,867,960
- Area of Vienna: 414.65 km^{2} (160.10 sq mi)
- Atlas of Vienna

Vienna Wien
- Location within Austria
- Coordinates: 48°12′N 16°22′E

=== Location of Vienna ===
- Vienna is situated within the following regions:
  - Northern Hemisphere and Eastern Hemisphere
    - Eurasia
      - Europe (outline)
        - Central Europe
          - Austria (outline)
          - Pannonian Basin
  - Time zone(s):
    - Central European Time (UTC+01)
    - In Summer (DST): Central European Summer Time (UTC+02)

=== Environment of Vienna ===
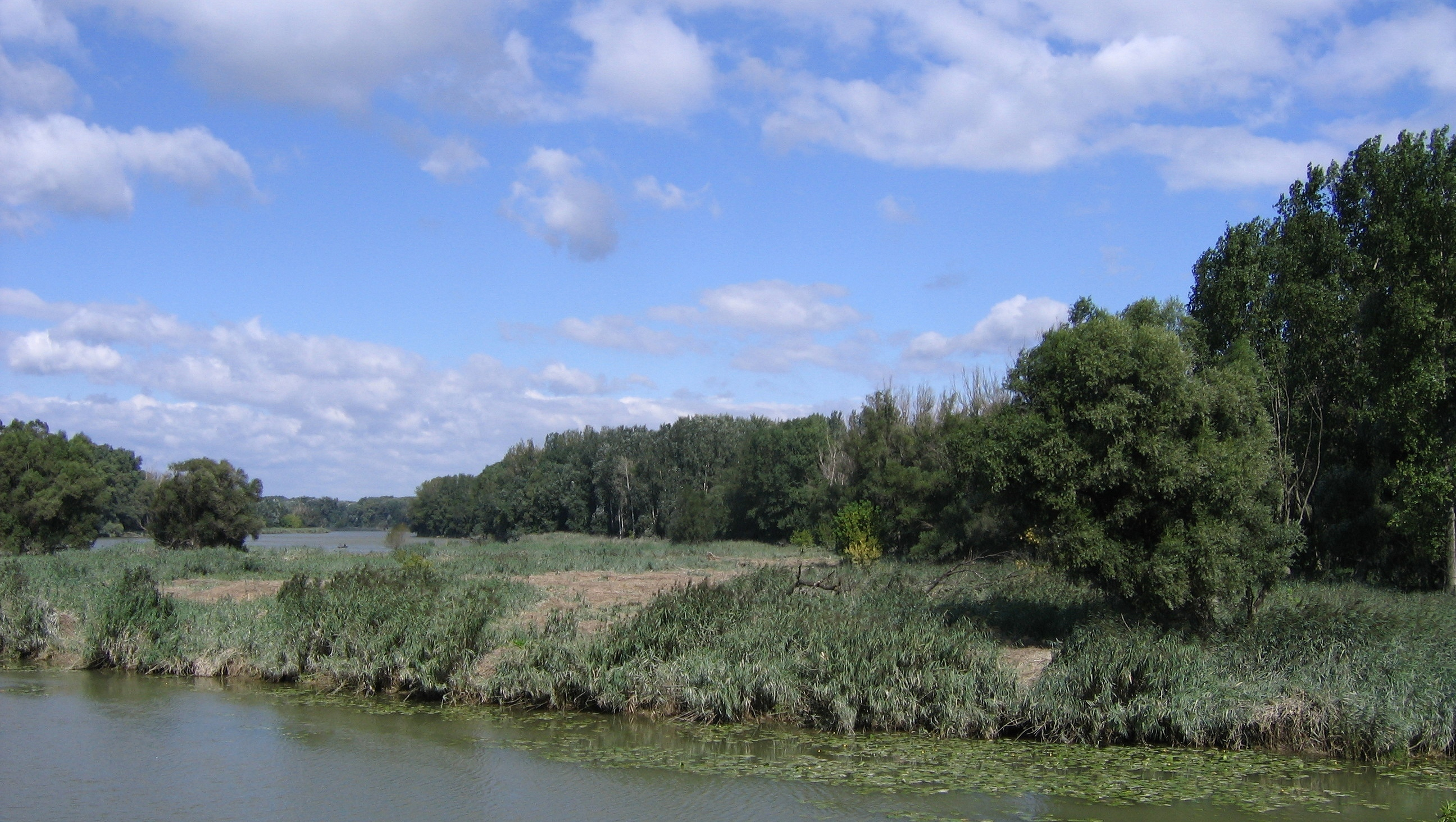
Vienna floodplain

- Climate of Vienna

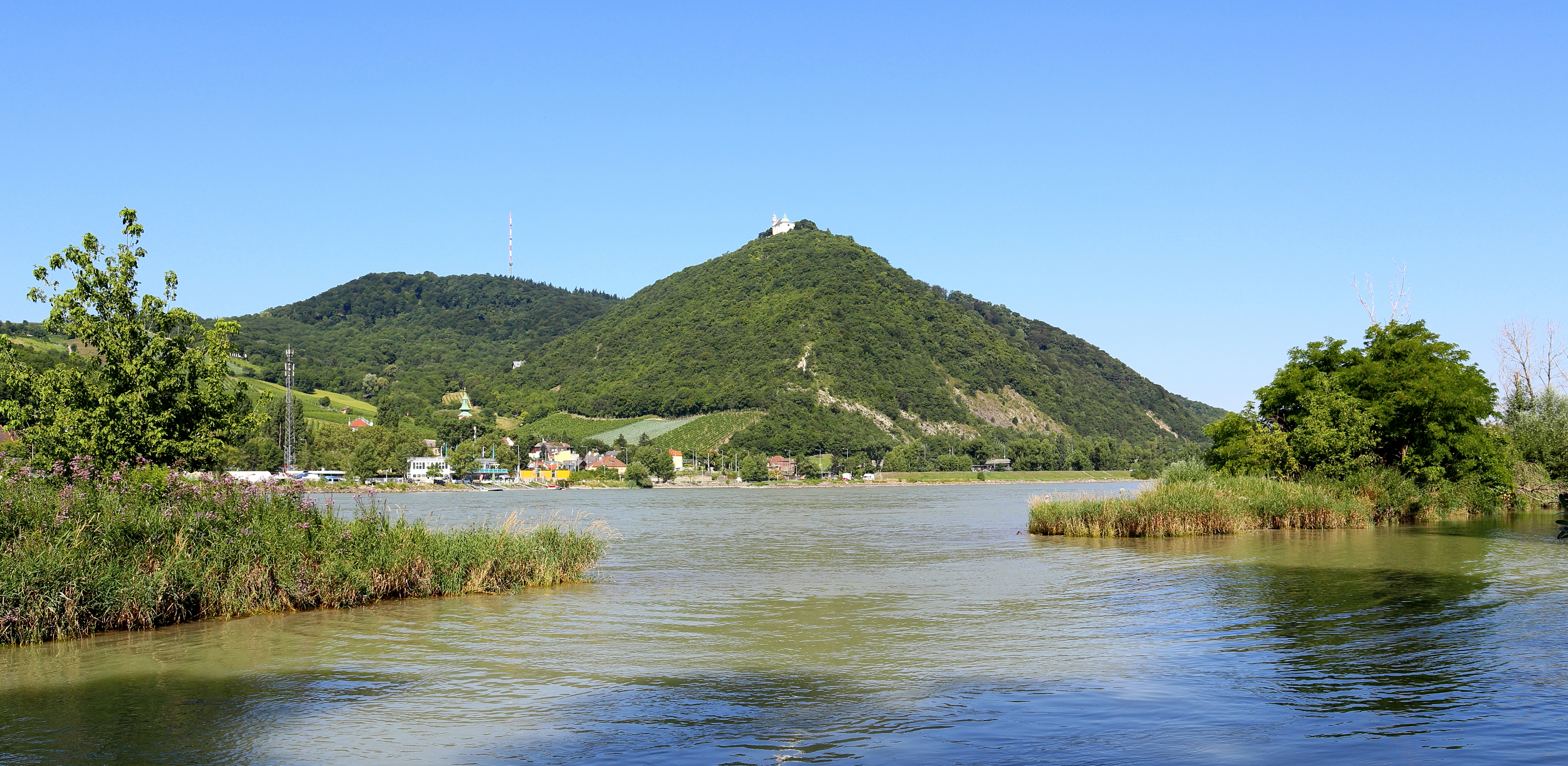
The Leopoldsberg

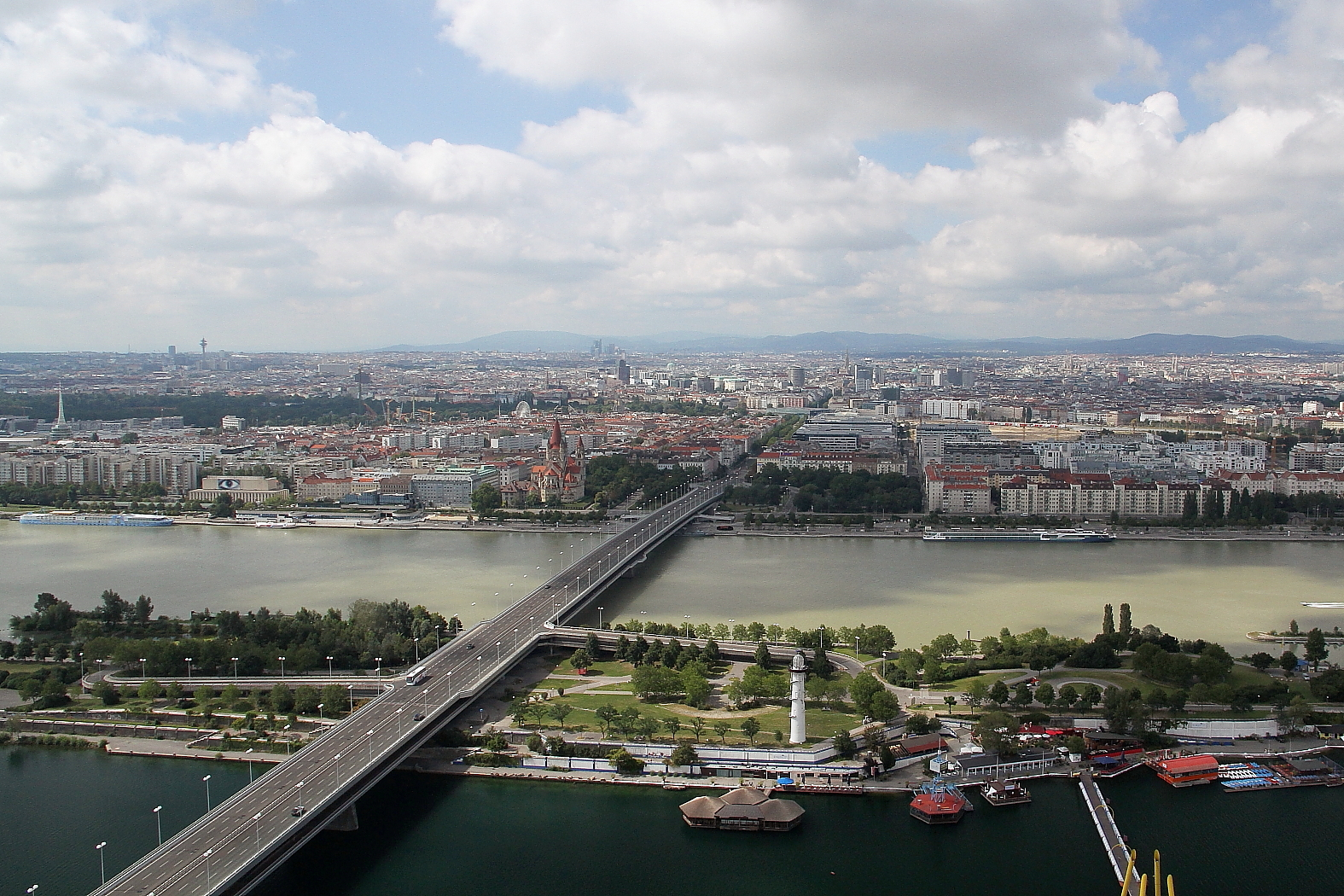
The Donauinsel

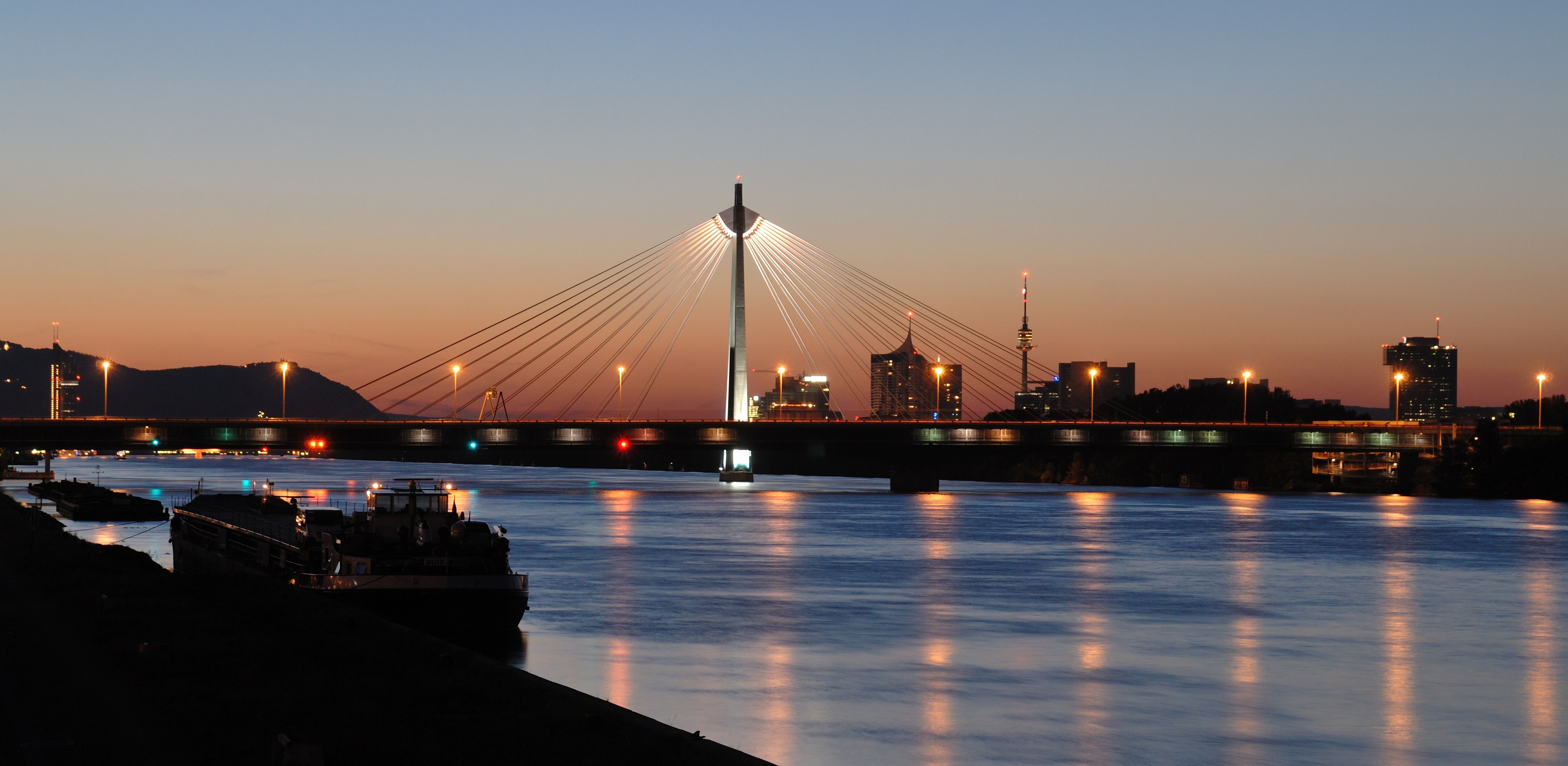
The Danube in Vienna

==== Natural geographic features of Vienna ====
- Floodplains in Vienna
  - Lobau
- Highlands in Vienna
  - Vienna Woods
- Hills in Vienna
  - Gallitzinberg
  - Hackenberg
  - Hermannskogel
  - Hohe Warte
  - Kahlenberg
  - Leopoldsberg
  - Schenkenberg
- Islands in Vienna
  - Donauinsel
- Rivers in Vienna
  - Danube
    - Vienna Danube regulation
      - Donaukanal
      - New Danube
  - Wien (river)

=== Areas of Vienna ===
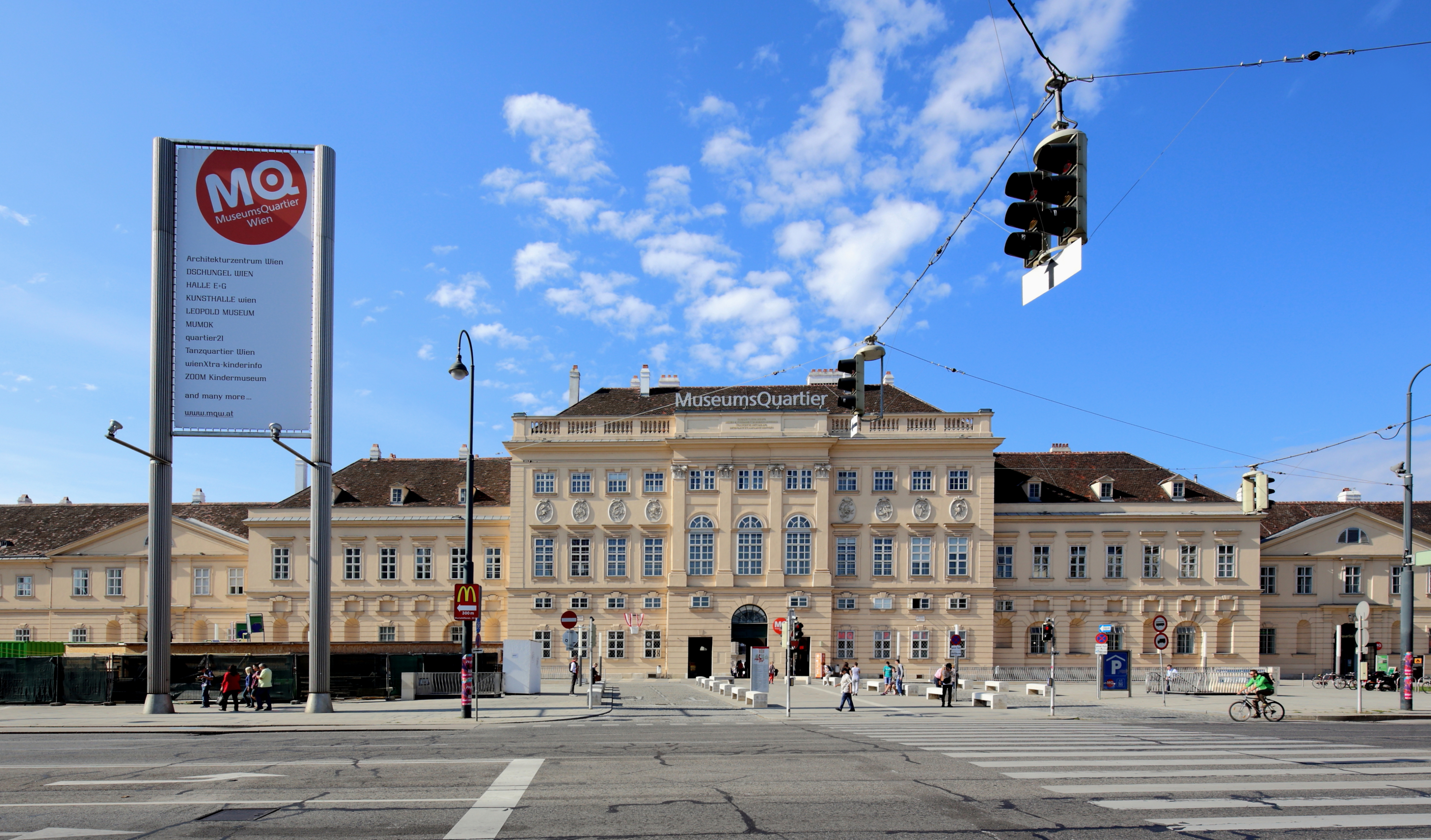
The Museumsquartier

- Districts of Vienna

=== Locations in Vienna ===
- Tourist attractions in Vienna
  - Museumsquartier
  - Shopping areas and markets
  - World Heritage Sites in Vienna
    - Innere Stadt
    - Schönbrunn Palace

==== Bridges in Vienna ====
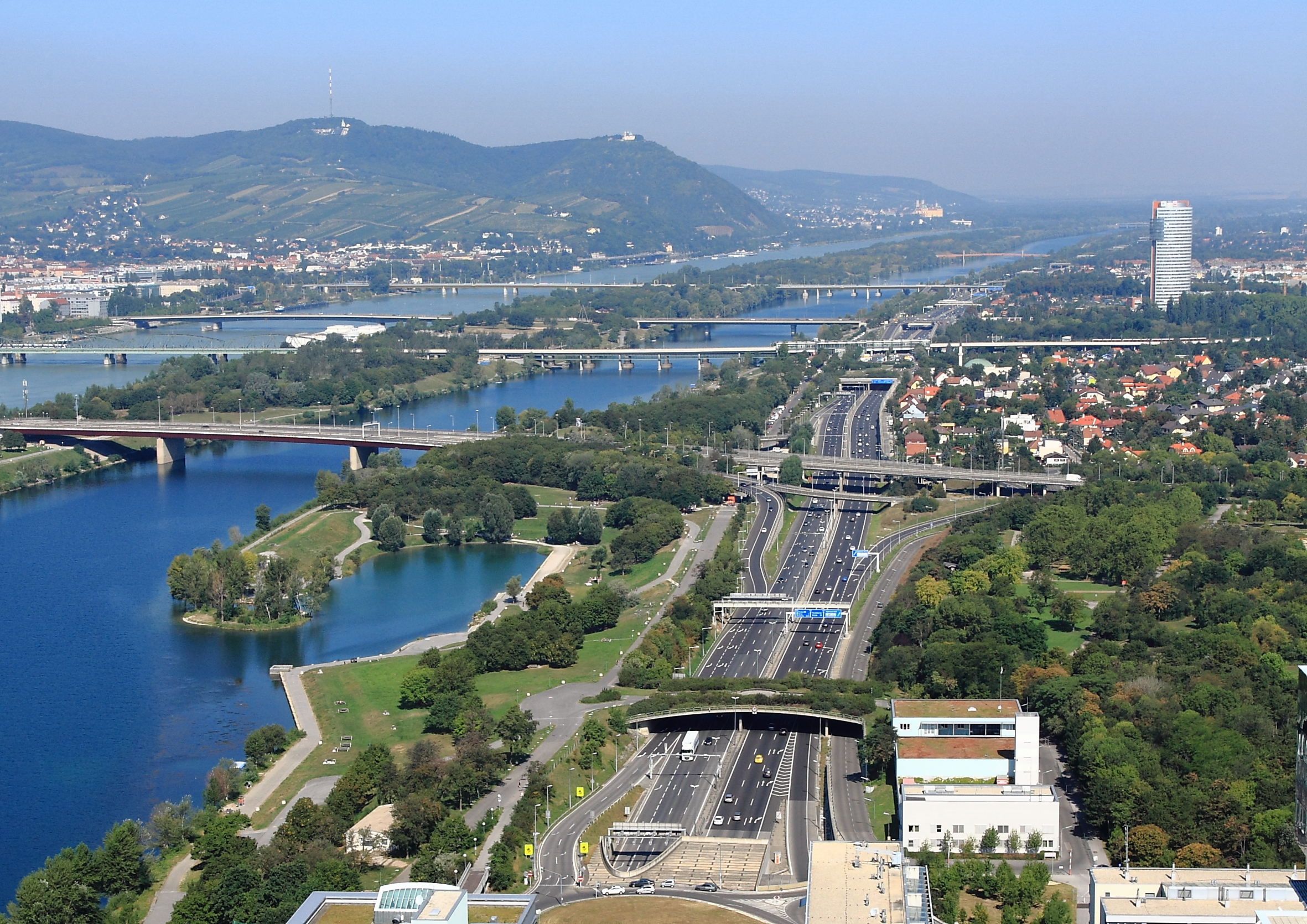
Bridges over the Danube

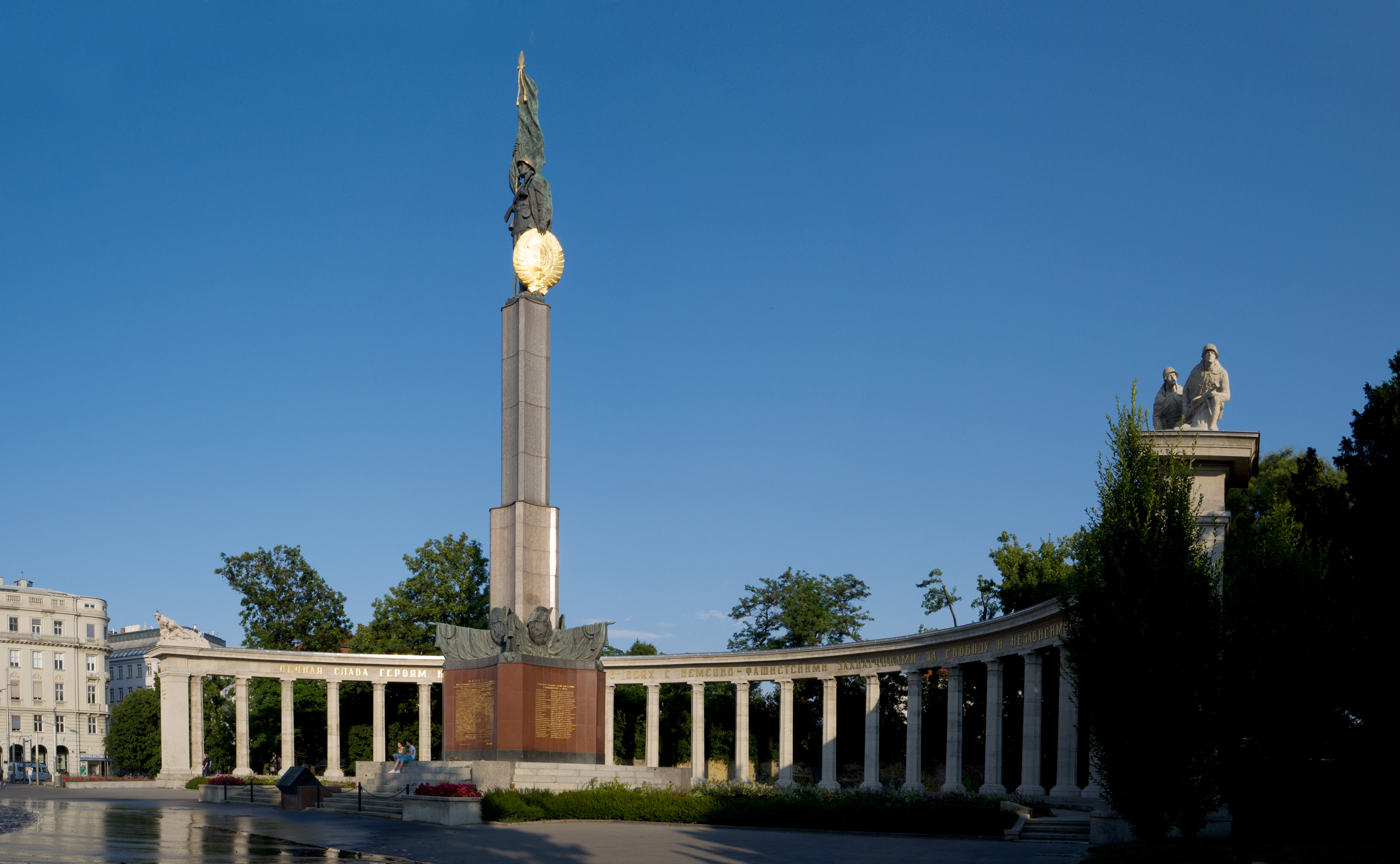
The Soviet War Memorial

- Hohe Brücke
- Northern Railway Bridge
- Reichsbrücke

==== City walls of Vienna ====
- Linienwall

==== Cultural and exhibition centres in Vienna ====
- Kunsthalle Wien
- Vienna Künstlerhaus

==== Monuments and memorials in Vienna ====
- Pestsäule
- Rathausmann
- Scholars Pavilion
- Soviet War Memorial
- Spinnerin am Kreuz

==== Museums and galleries in Vienna ====
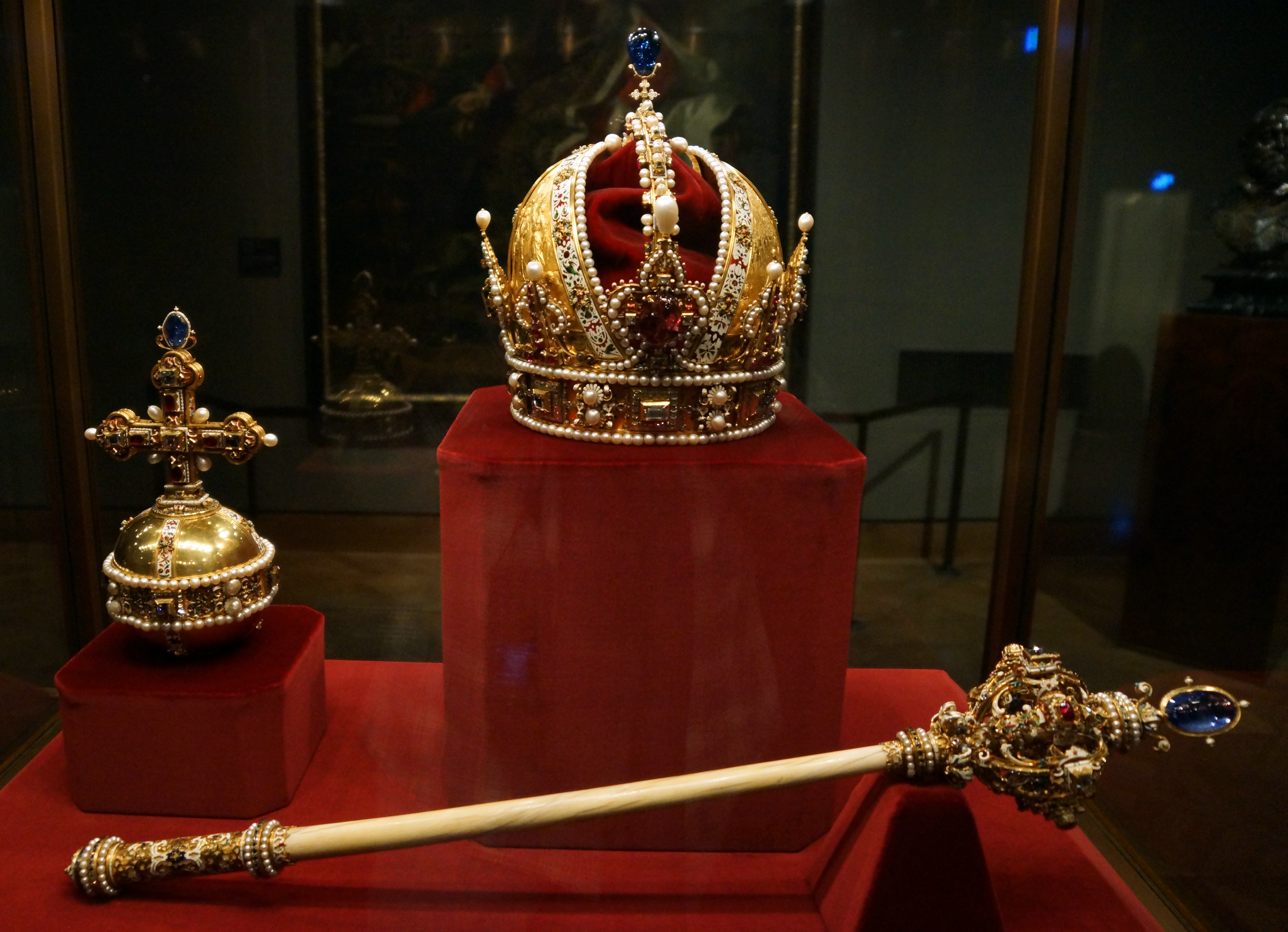
Imperial Crown, Orb, and Sceptre of Austria, kept in the Imperial Treasury

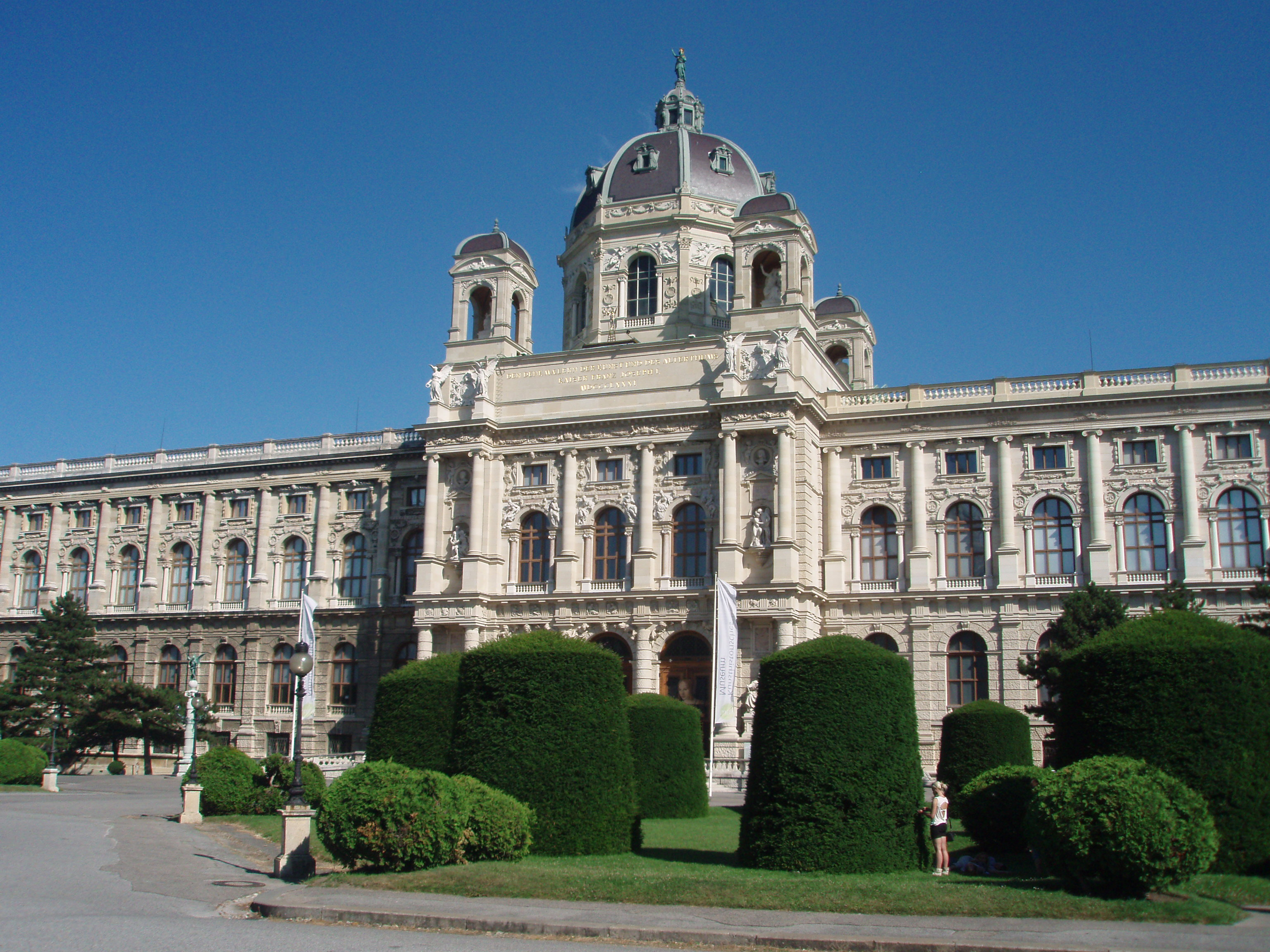
Kunsthistorisches Museum

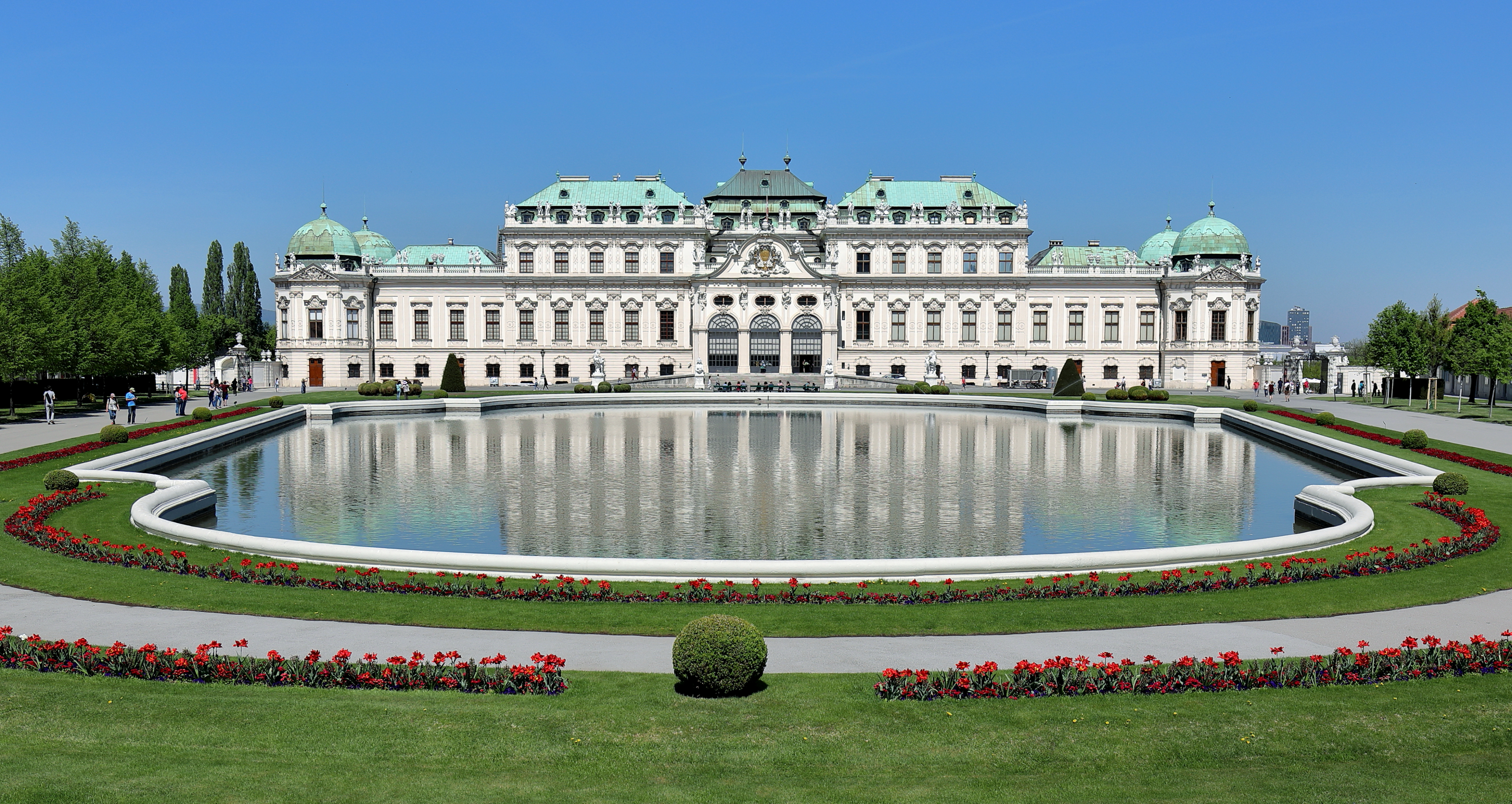
The Belvedere palace

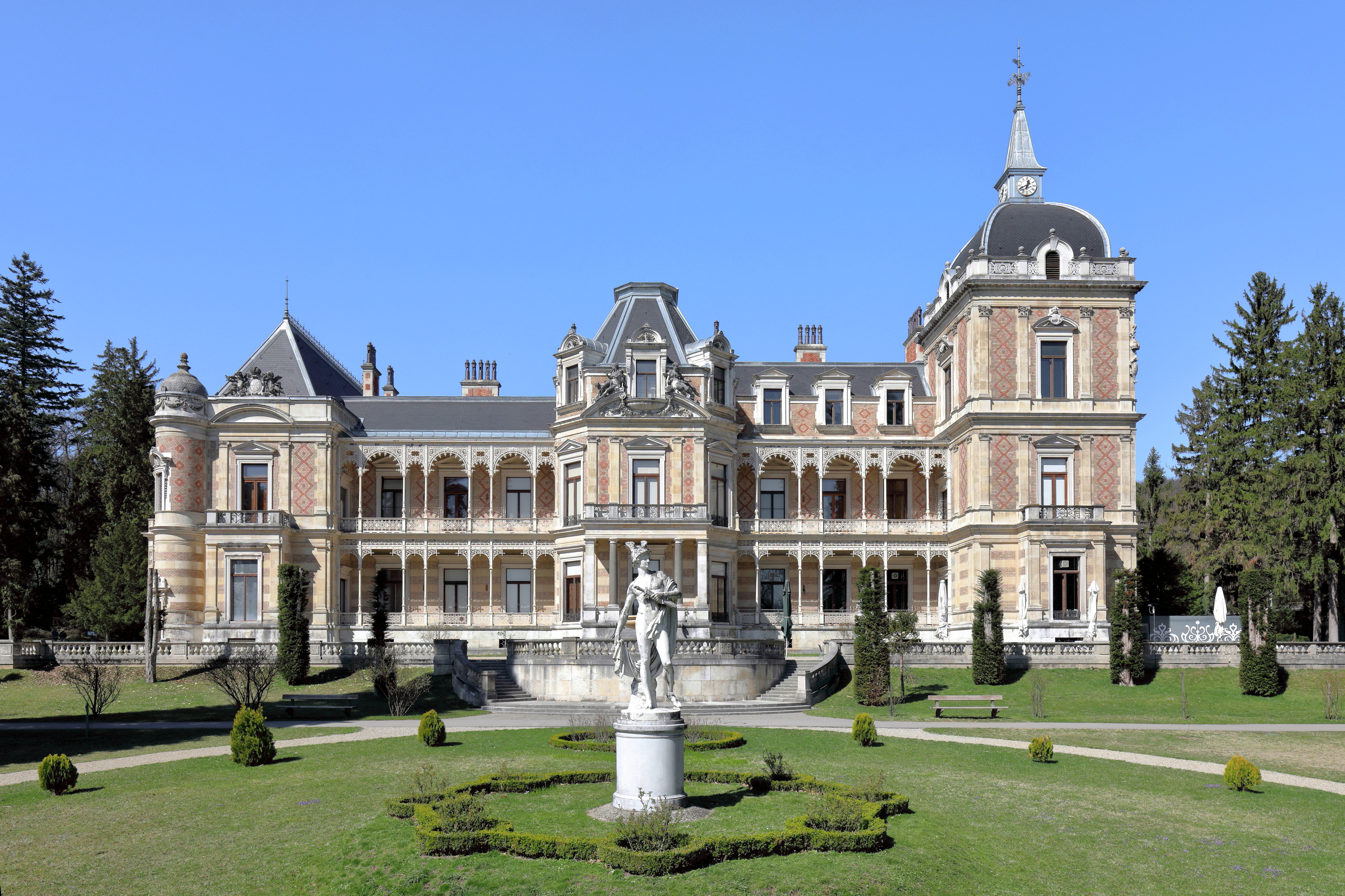
The Hermesvilla

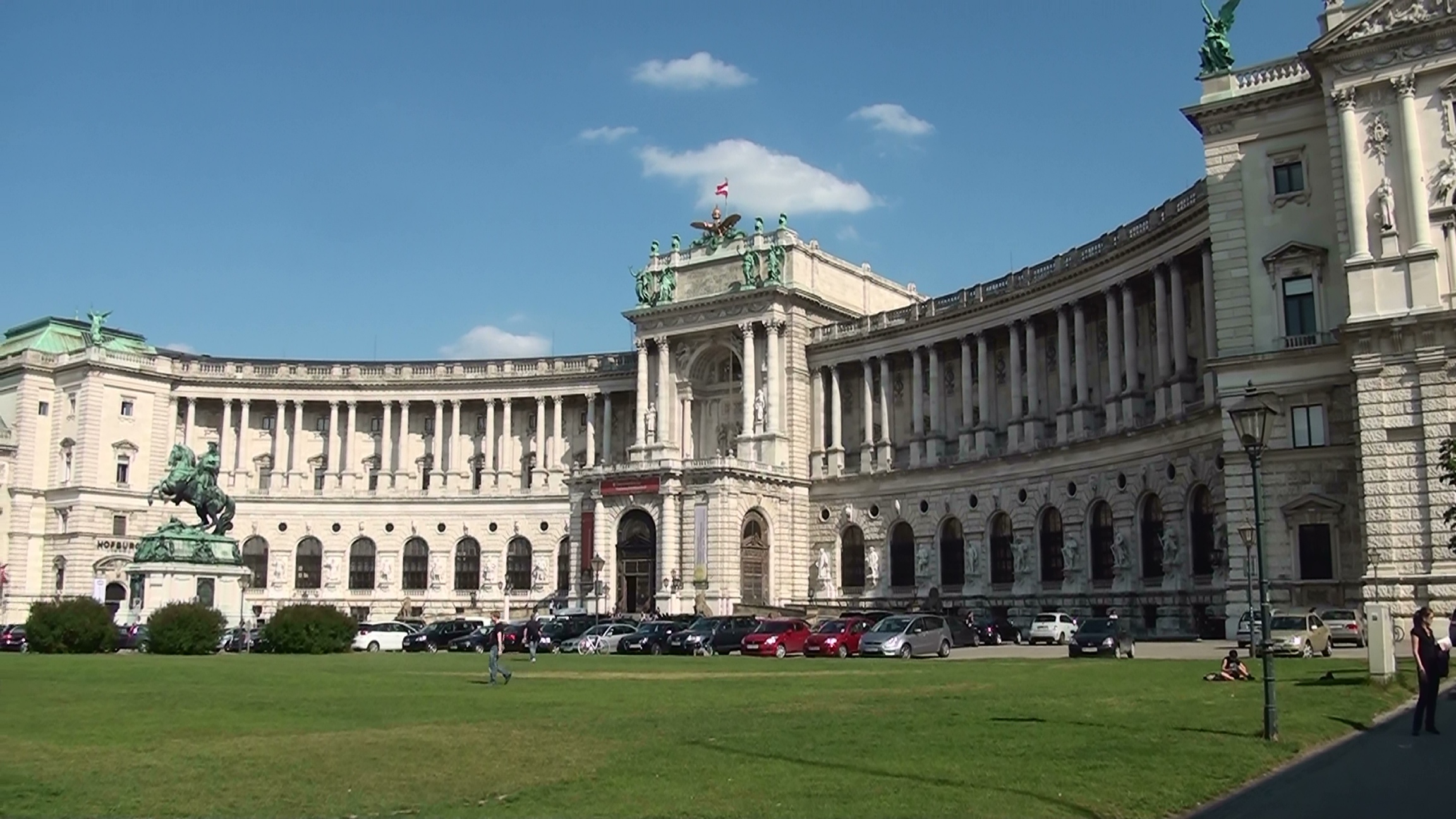
The Hofburg

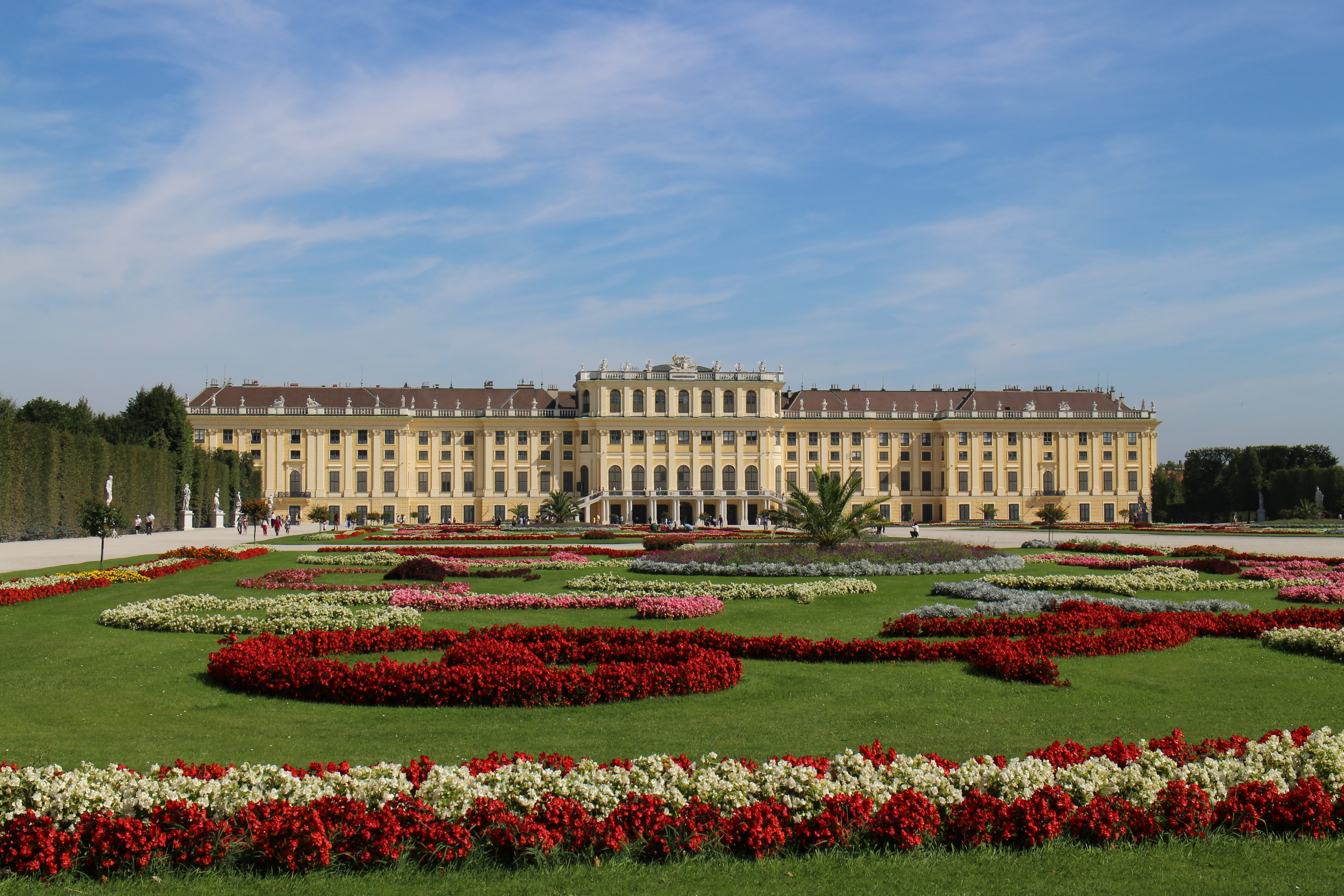
Schönbrunn Palace

The Gloriette in the Schönbrunn Palace Garden

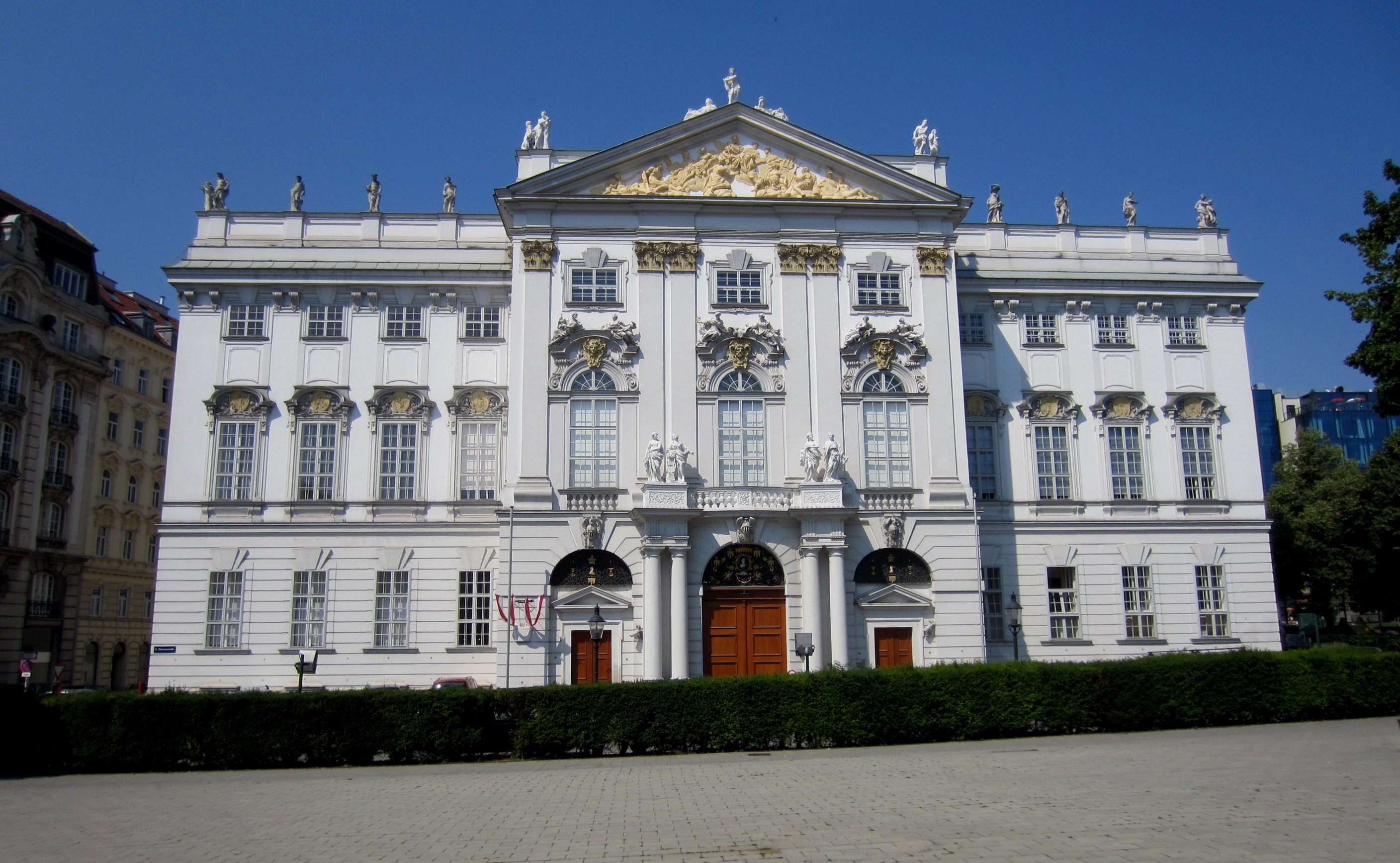
Palais Trautson

Museums in Vienna

- Albertina
- Austrian Museum of Folk Life and Folk Art
- Ephesos Museum
- Funeral Museum Vienna
- Galerie nächst St. Stephan
- Globe Museum
- Haus der Musik
- Imperial Furniture Collection
- Imperial Treasury
  - Austrian Crown Jewels
- KunstHausWien
- Kunsthistorisches Museum
- Leopold Museum
- Liechtenstein Museum
- Madame Tussauds Vienna
- Mozarthaus Vienna
- mumok
- Museum of Applied Arts
- Museum of Military History
- Natural History Museum
- Österreichische Galerie Belvedere
- Technisches Museum Wien
- Vienna Museum

==== Palaces and villas in Vienna ====
- Belvedere
  - Belvedere Palace Chapel
- Deutschmeister-Palais
- Episcopal Palace
- Hermesvilla
- Hofburg
  - Spanish Riding School
- Palais Arnstein
- Palais Auersperg
- Palais Augarten
- Palais Caprara-Geymüller
- Palais Chotek
- Palais Clam-Gallas
- Palais Coburg
- Palais Equitable
  - Stock im Eisen
- Palais Hoyos
- Palais Kinsky
- Palais Lieben-Auspitz
- Palais Lobkowitz
- Palais Modena
- Palais Mollard-Clary
- Palais Pallavicini
- Palais Porcia
- Palais Rasumofsky
- Palais Schey von Koromla
- Palais Schwarzenberg
- Palais Strozzi
- Palais Todesco
- Palais Trautson
- Schloss Hetzendorf
- Schloss Neugebäude
- Schloss Neuwaldegg
- Schloss Wilhelminenberg
- Schönbrunn Palace
  - Gloriette
  - Palmenhaus Schönbrunn
  - Wüstenhaus Schönbrunn
- Stadtpalais Liechtenstein
- Winter Palace of Prince Eugene

==== Parks and gardens in Vienna ====
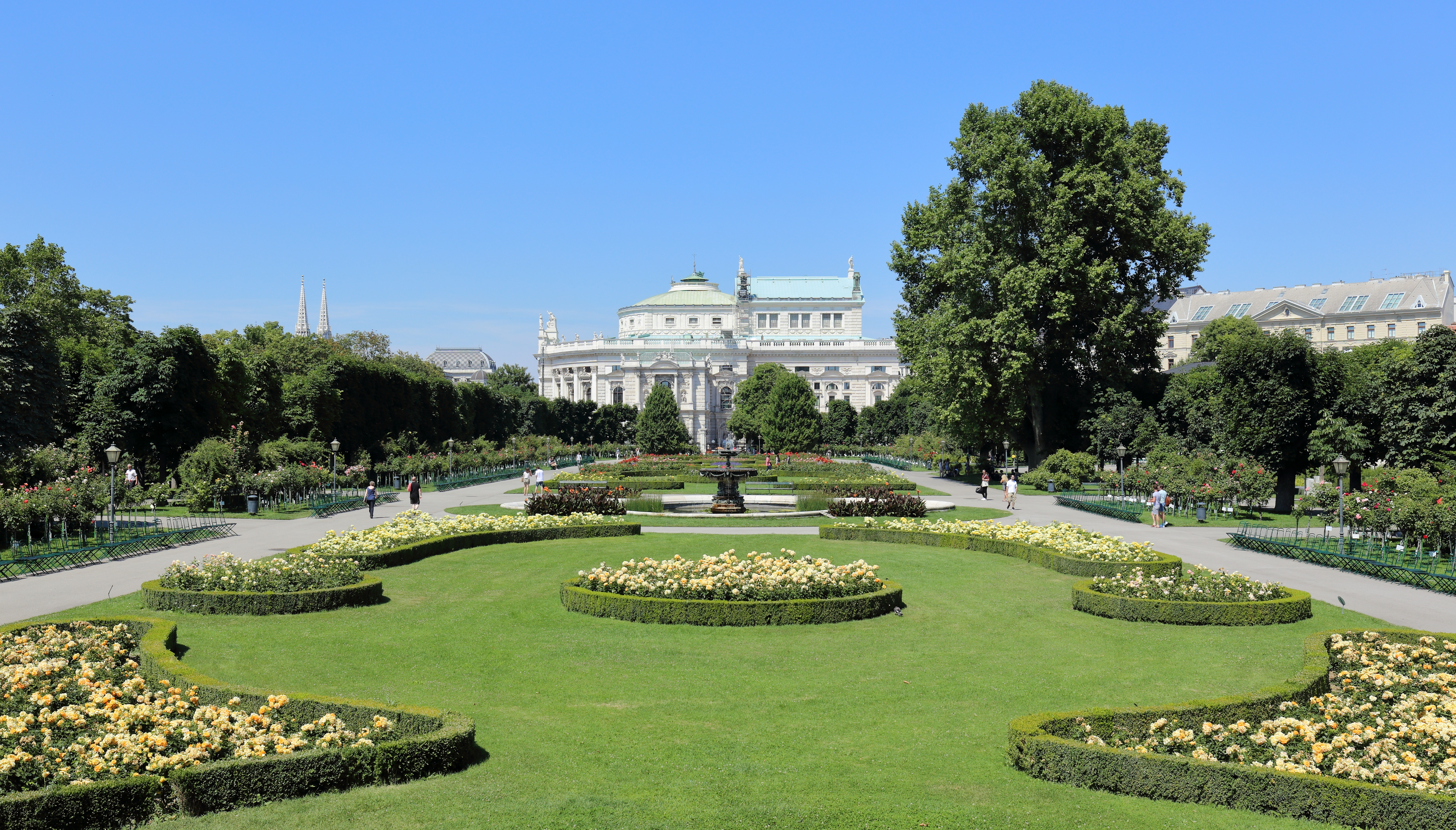
Volksgarten

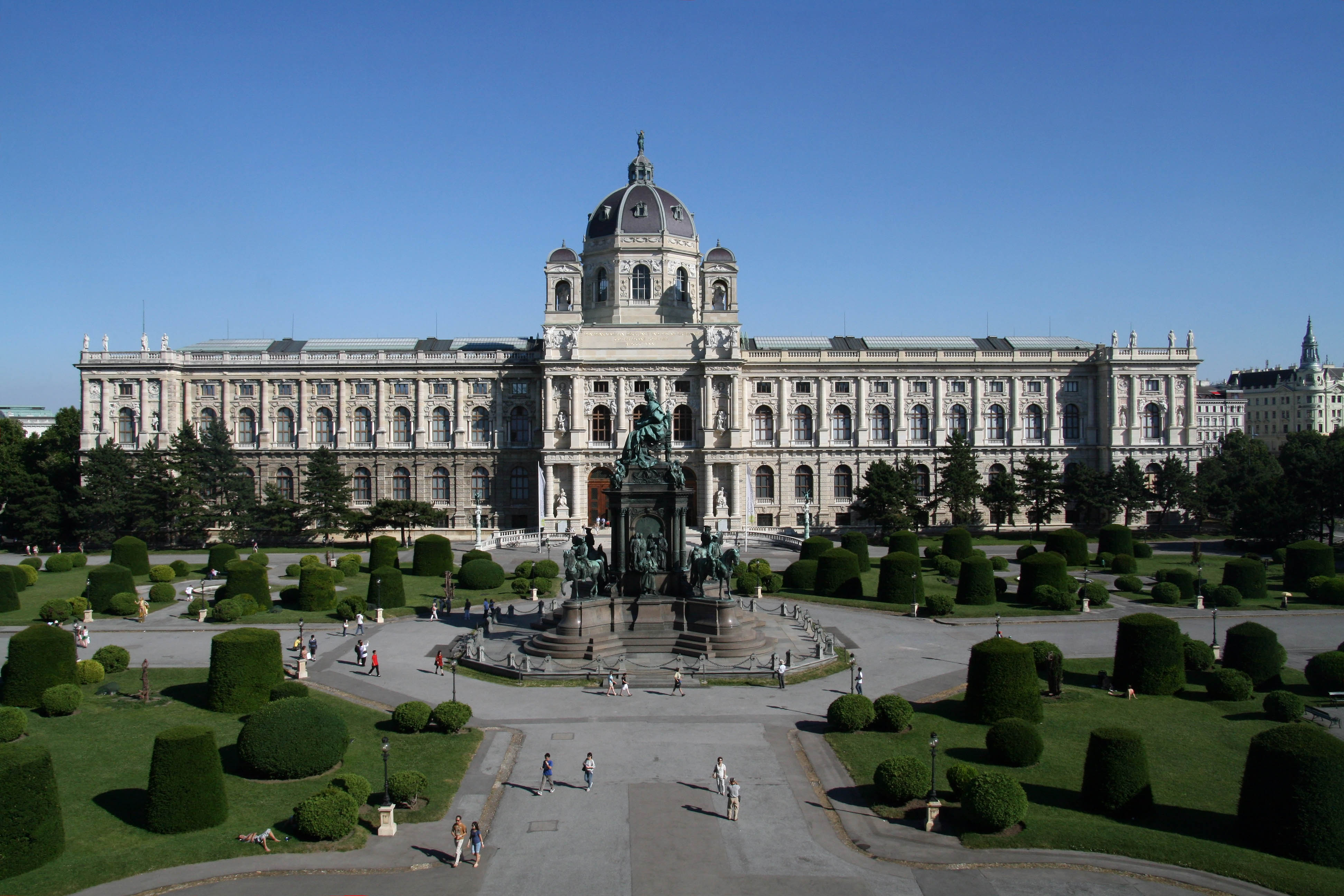
Maria-Theresien-Platz

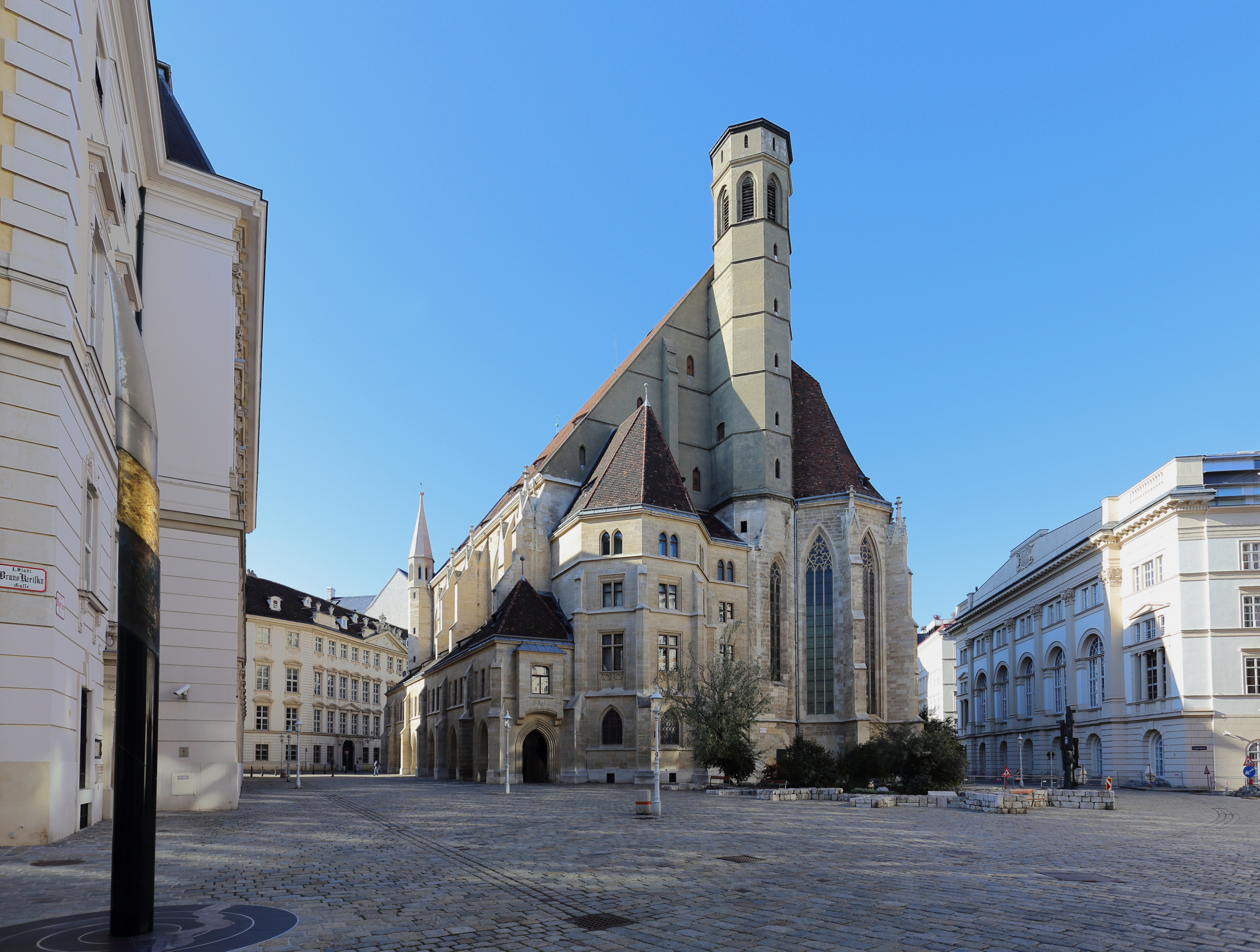
Minoritenplatz with Minoritenkirche

- Augarten
- Botanical Garden of the University of Vienna
- Danube-Auen National Park
- Prater
  - Wurstelprater
    - Wiener Riesenrad
- Rathauspark
- Stadtpark
- Volksgarten

==== Public squares in Vienna ====
- Ballhausplatz
- Freyung
- Friedrich-Schmidt-Platz
- Heldenplatz
- Josefsplatz
- Karlsplatz
- Maria-Theresien-Platz
- Mexikoplatz
- Minoritenplatz
- Praterstern
- Rathausplatz
- Schillerplatz
- Schwarzenbergplatz
- Schwedenplatz
- Stephansplatz

==== Religious buildings in Vienna ====
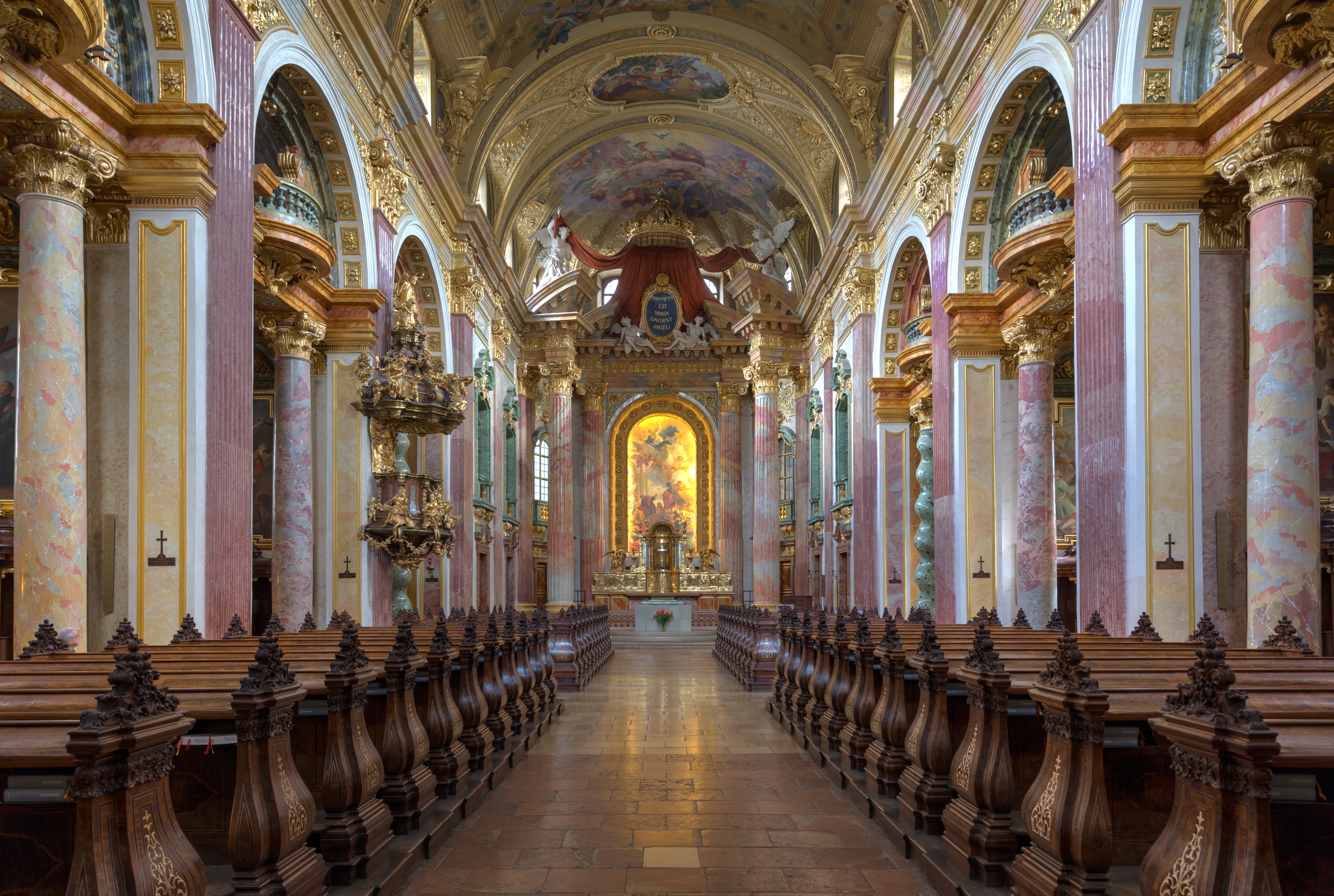
The Jesuit Church

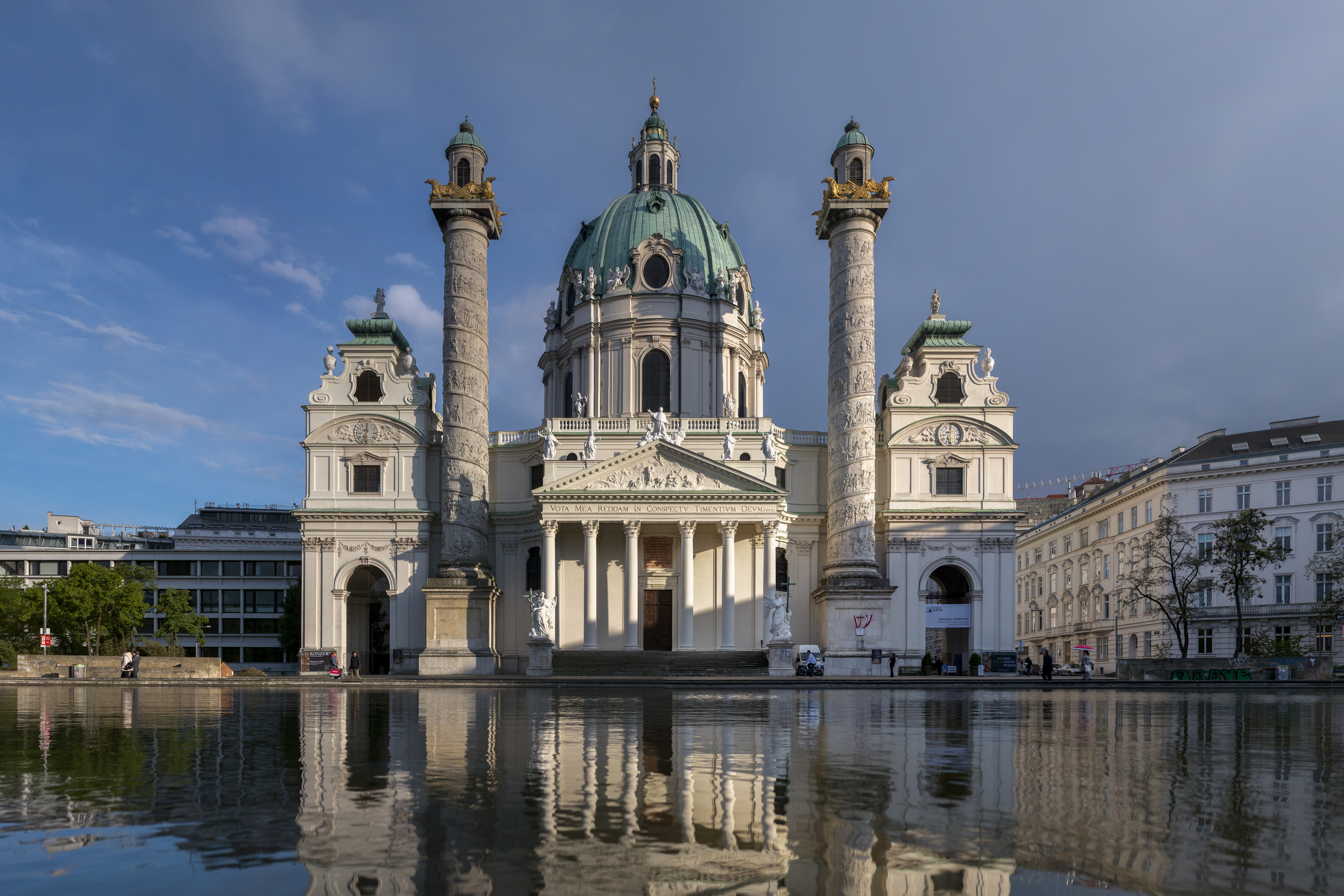
Karlskirche

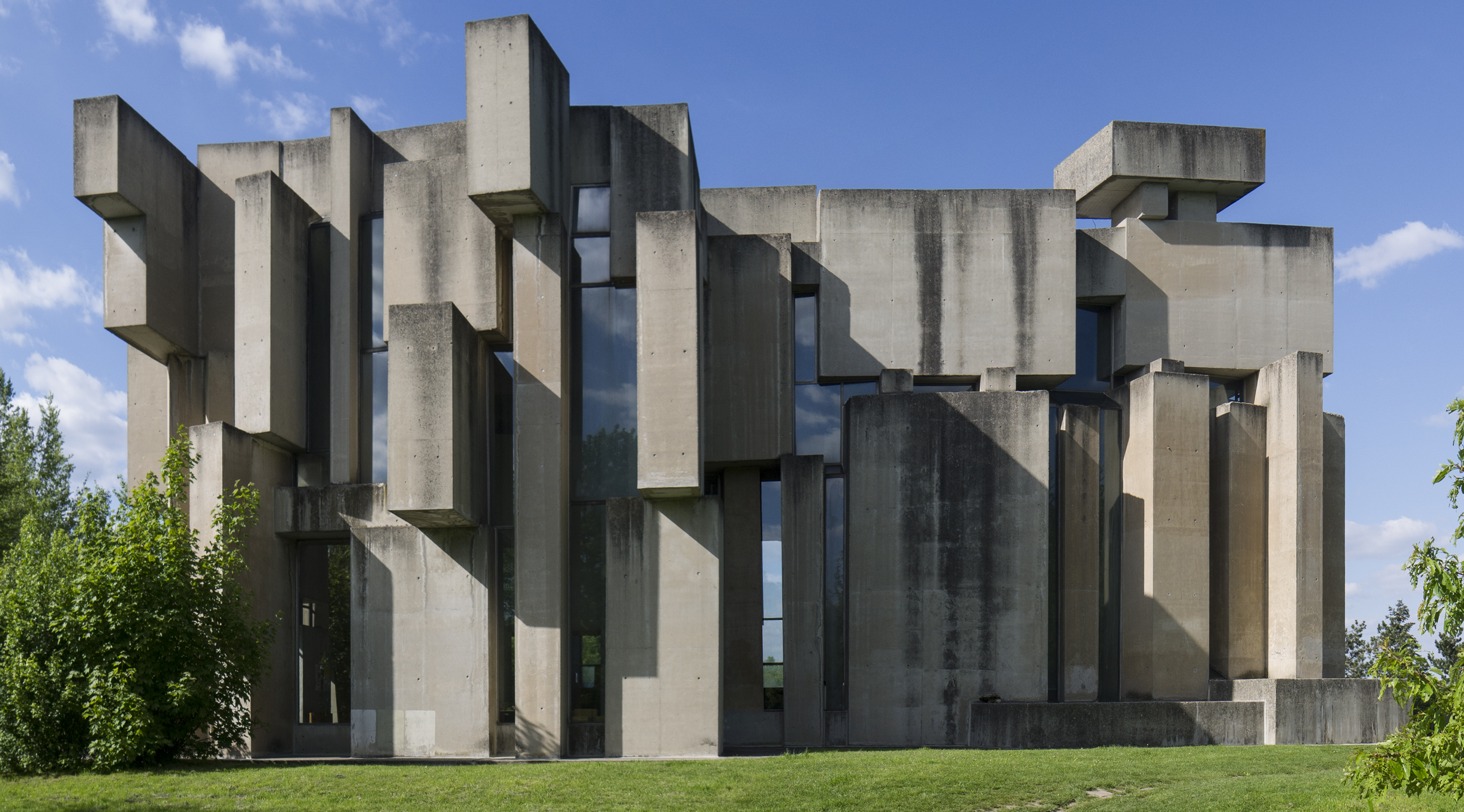
Wotruba Church

- Augustinian Church
- Capuchin Church
  - Imperial Crypt
- Dominican Church
- Franciscan Church
- Holy Trinity Greek Orthodox Church
- Jesuit Church
- Kaasgrabenkirche
- Karlskirche
- Lutheran City Church
- Maltese Church
- Minoritenkirche
- Piarist Church
- Schottenkirche
- Servite Church
- St. Canisius's Church
- St. Francis of Assisi Church
- St. Leopold's Church
- St. Michael's Church
- St. Peter's Church
- St. Rochus
- St. Stephen's Cathedral
- St. Ulrich
- Votive Church
- Wotruba Church

==== Secular buildings in Vienna ====
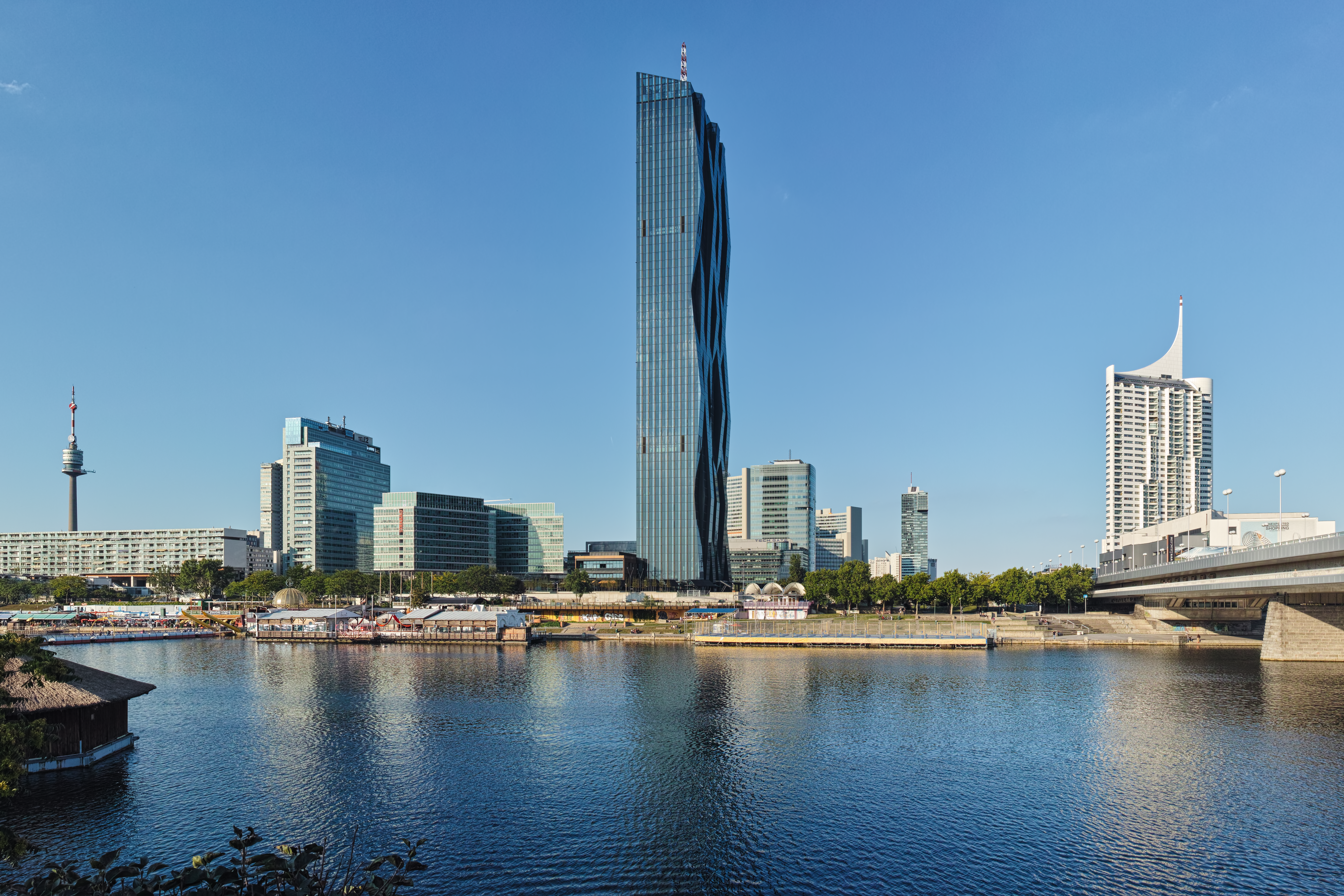
The DC Tower 1

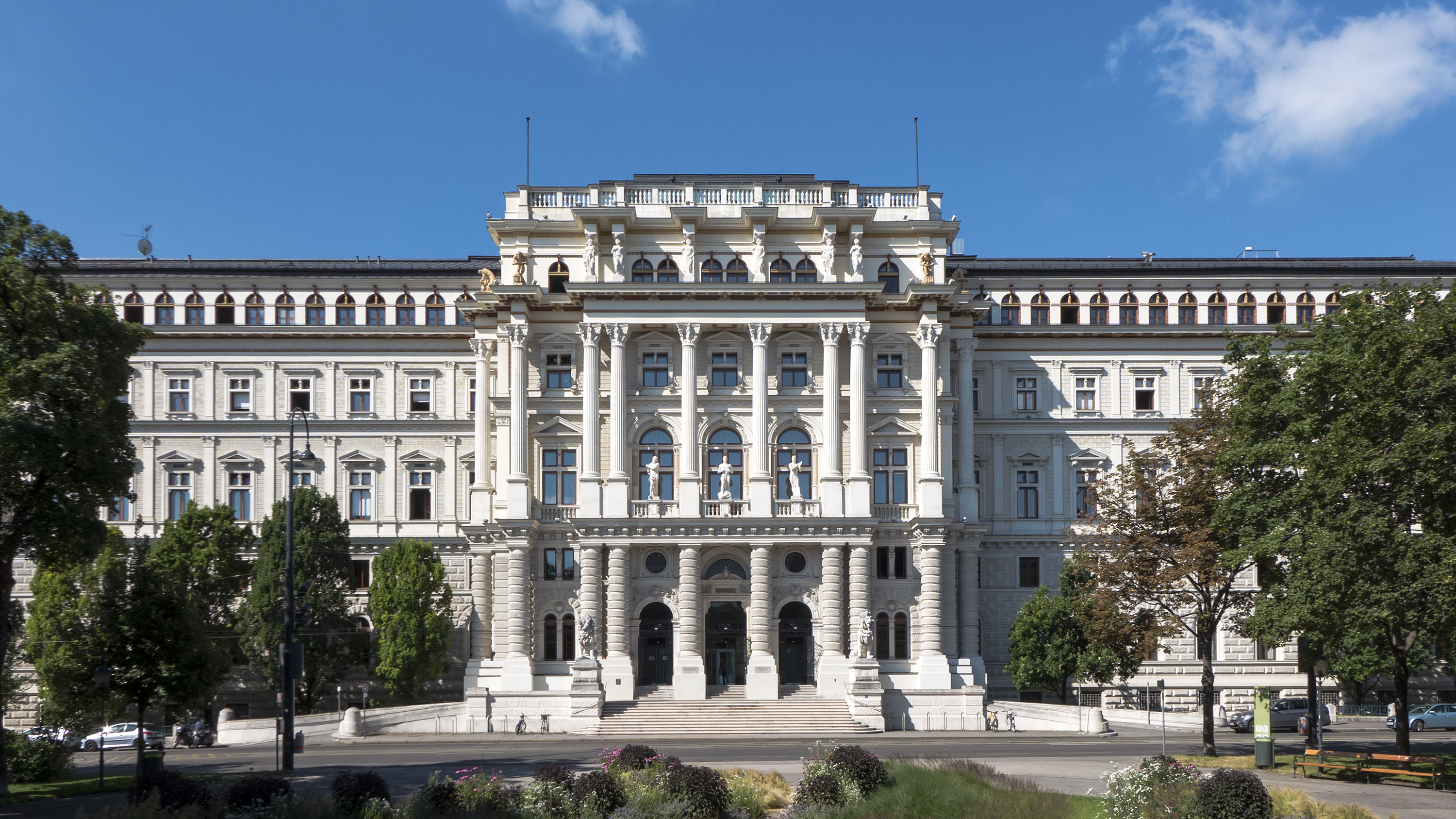
The Palace of Justice

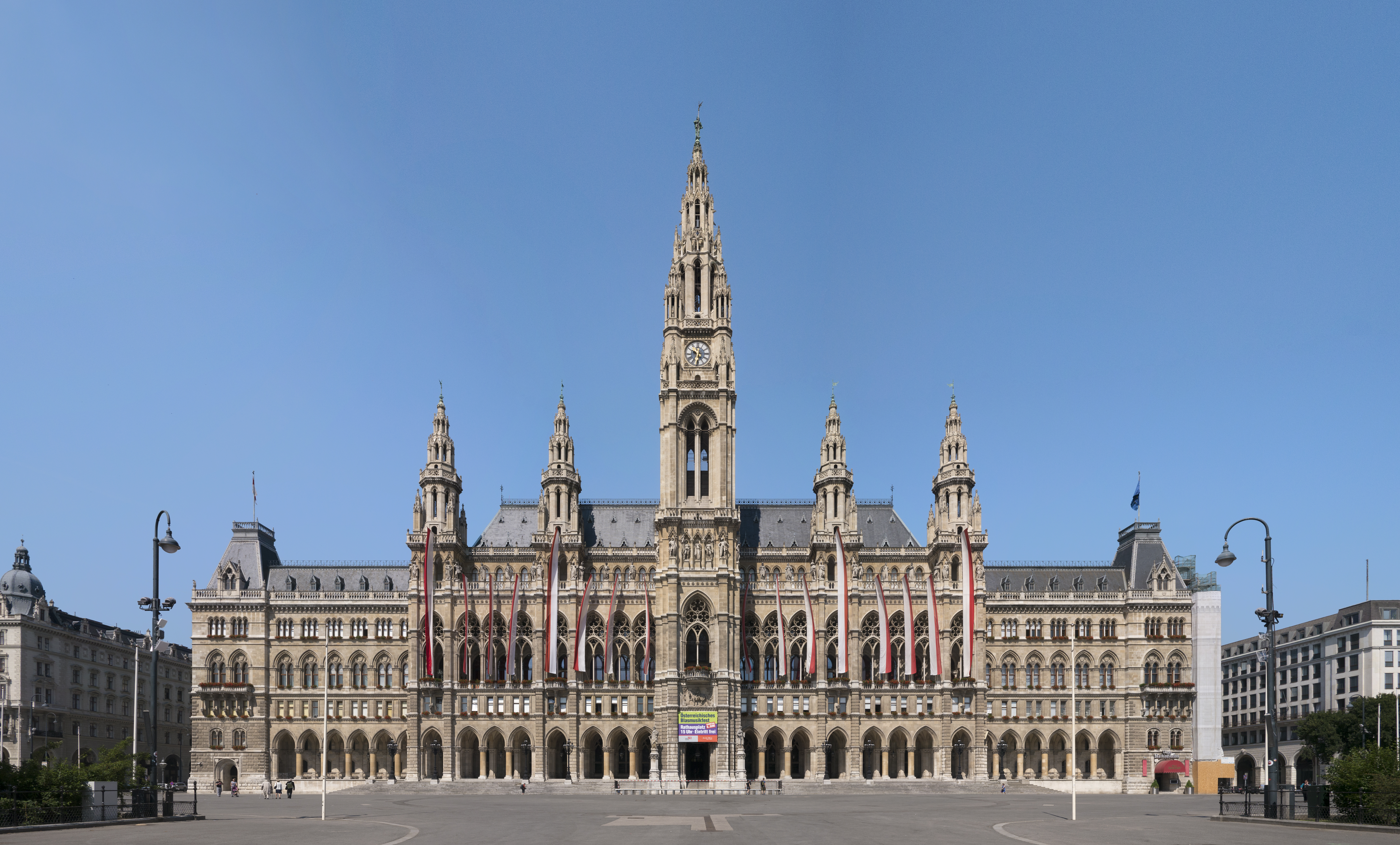
The Rathaus

- Arsenal
- Austrian Parliament Building
- Central Bathhouse Vienna
- DC Towers
- Dorotheum
- Gasometer
- Haas House
- Hundertwasserhaus
- Karl Marx-Hof
- Kursalon Hübner
- Lusthaus
- Messe Wien
- Millennium Tower
- Palace of Justice
- Palais des Beaux Arts
- Rathaus
  - Wienbibliothek im Rathaus
- Vienna International Centre
- Vienna Twin Tower
- Zacherlfabrik
- Zacherlhaus

==== Streets in Vienna ====
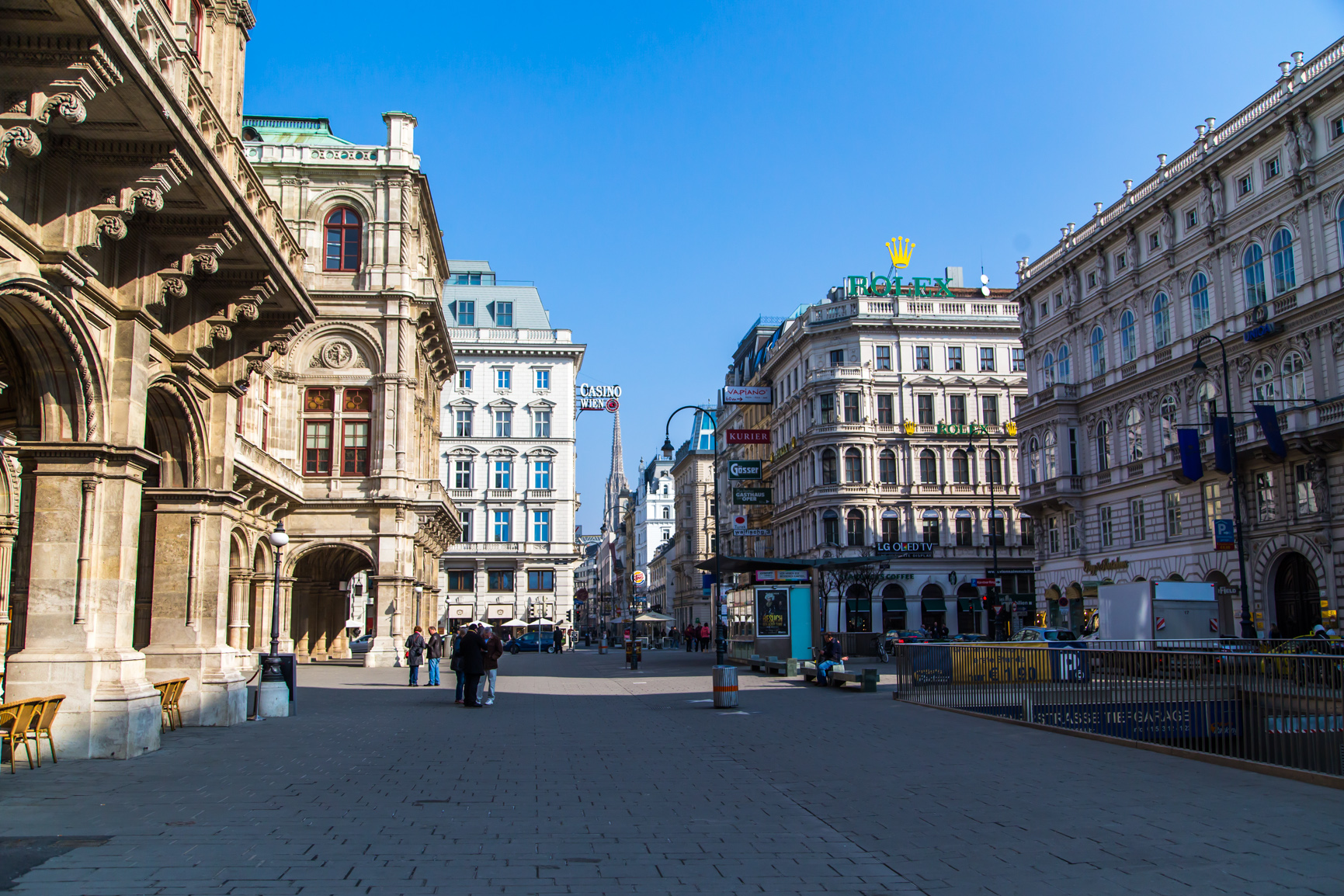
Kärntner Straße

- The Graben
- Herrengasse
- Kärntner Straße
- Vienna Beltway
- Wienzeile

==== Theatres in Vienna ====
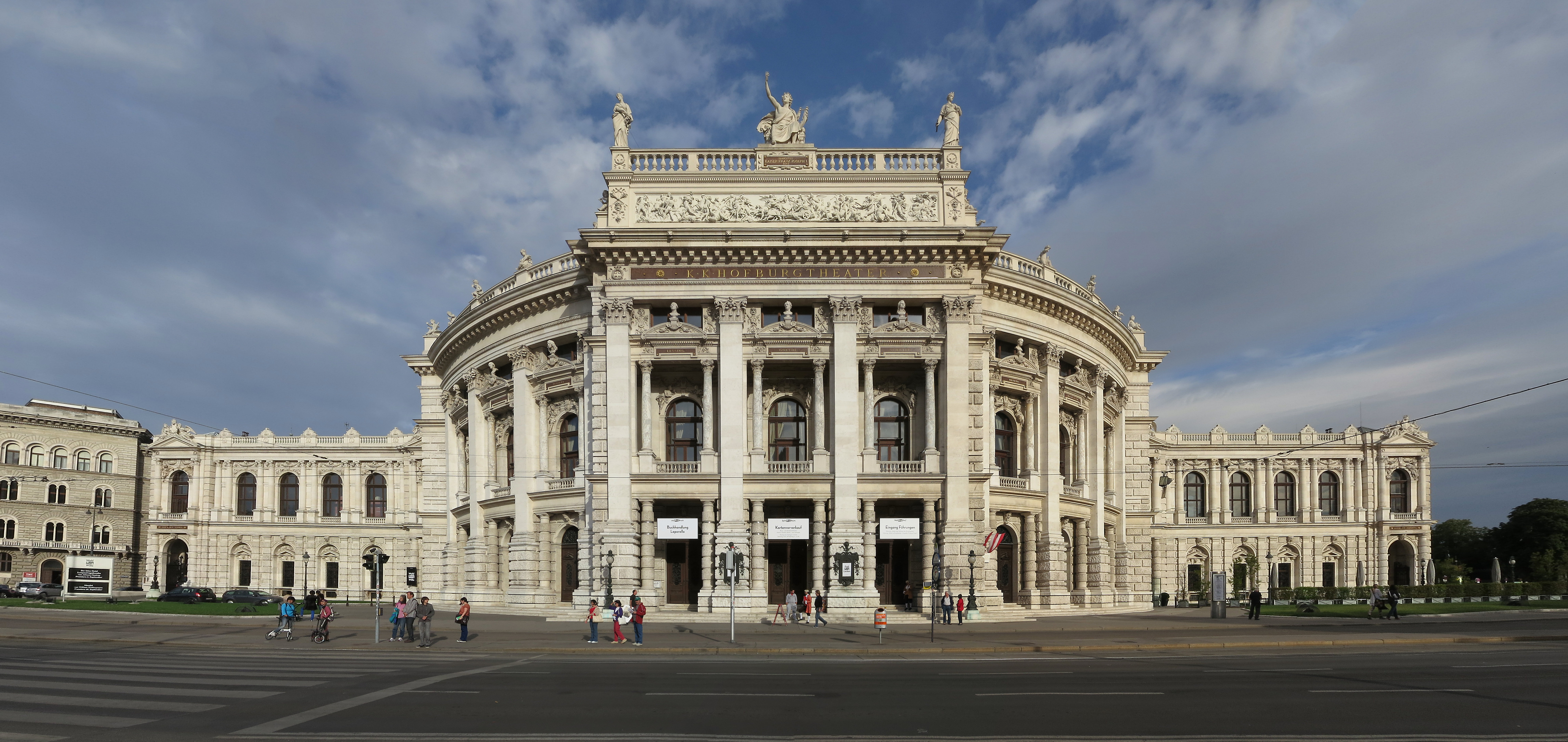
The Burgtheater

- Burgtheater
- Raimund Theater
- Theater am Kärntnertor
- Theater an der Wien
- Theater in der Josefstadt
- Vienna's English Theatre
- Volkstheater

==== Towers in Vienna ====
- Donauturm

=== Demographics of Vienna ===
Demographics of Vienna

== Government and politics of Vienna ==
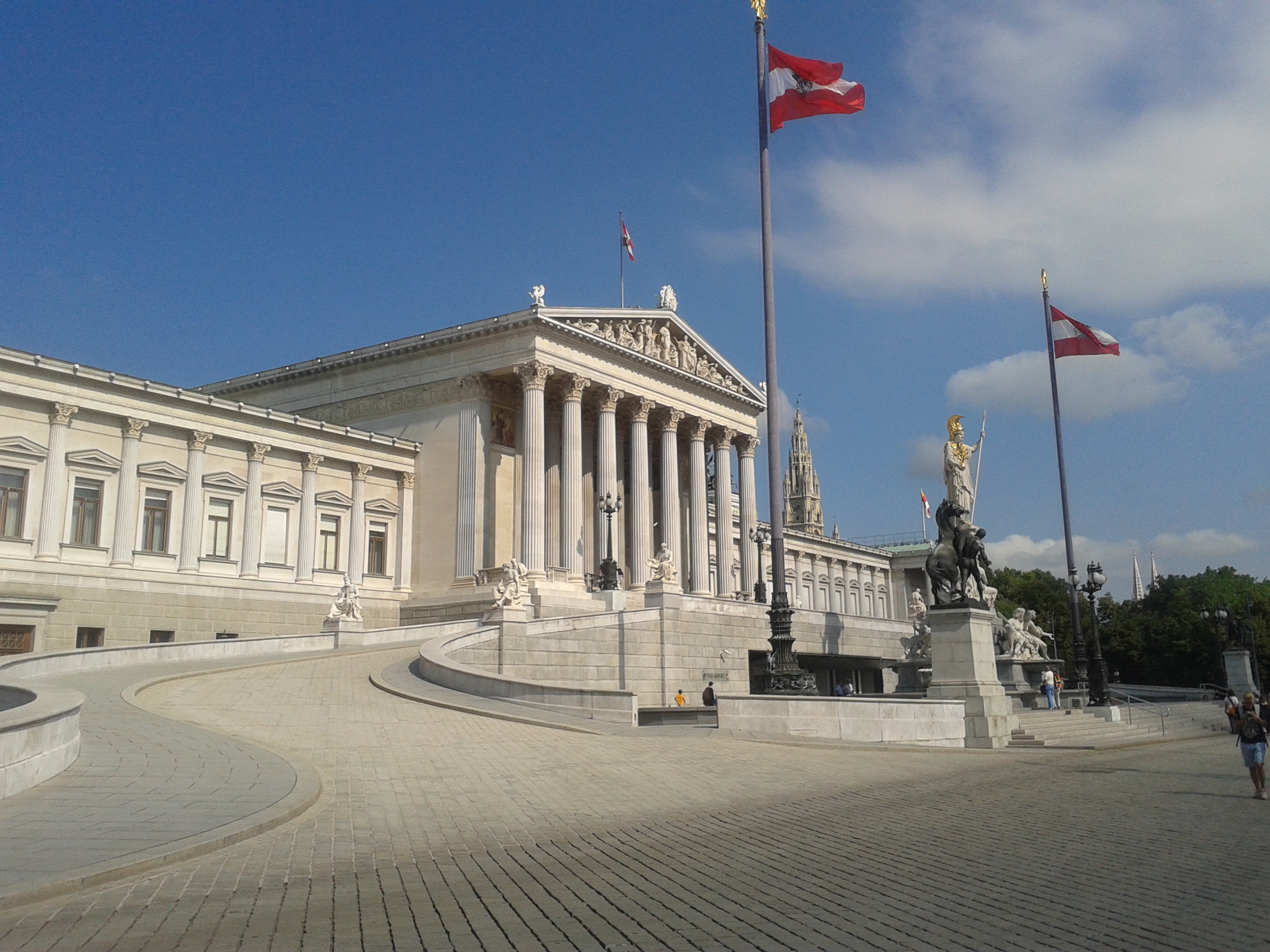
The Austrian Parliament Building

Politics of Vienna

- Government of Vienna
  - Gemeinderat and Landtag of Vienna
  - Mayor of Vienna

=== Law and order in Vienna ===
- Federal Police

=== International relations of Vienna ===
- United Nations Office at Vienna
  - United Nations Office on Drugs and Crime

== History of Vienna ==
History of Vienna

=== History of Vienna, by period or event ===
Timeline of Vienna

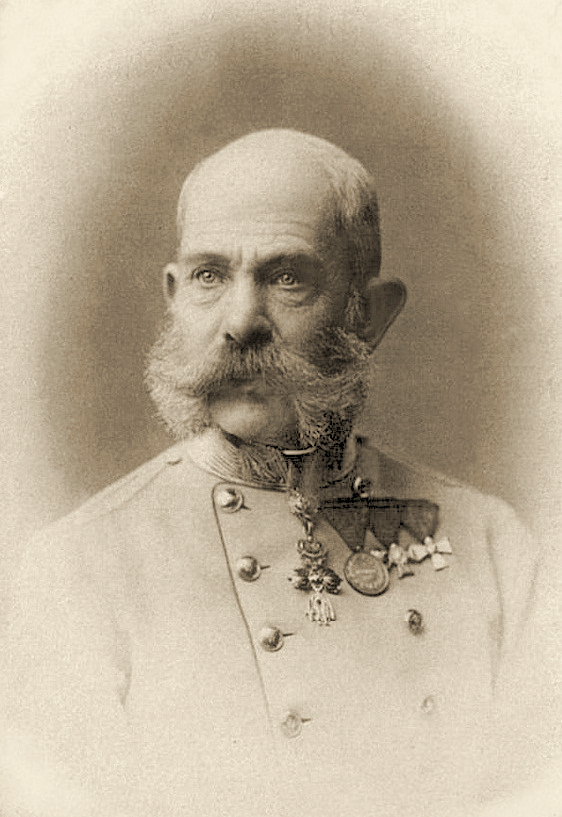
Franz Joseph I of Austria, the longest-reigning Emperor of Austria. Under his rule the city experienced rapid growth and an unprecedented flowering of the arts and architecture.

- Beginnings and early Middle Ages (from the 1st through the 10th century)
  - Babenberg rule (976)
  - Habsburg rule (1278)
    - Turkish sieges
      - Siege of Vienna (1529)
      - Battle of Vienna (1683)
- Vienna during the 18th century
  - Plague epidemic (1713)
- Vienna during the 19th century
  - Napoleonic Wars
    - Vienna becomes capital of the Austrian Empire (1804)
  - Congress of Vienna (1814–15)
  - Expansion under Emperor Franz Joseph I
- Vienna during the 20th century
  - World War I (1914–1918)
  - The First Republic – Vienna becomes capital of the Republic of German-Austria (1918) and then of the First Austrian Republic in 1919
  - Vienna during the Austrian Civil War of 1934
  - Annexation by German Third Reich (1938)
  - World War II (1939–1945)
    - Vienna Offensive (1945)
  - The Second Republic
- Modern history since independence (1955–present)

=== History of Vienna, by subject ===
- History of the Czechs in Vienna
- History of the Hungarians in Vienna
- History of the Jews in Vienna
- Treaty of Vienna (1606)
- Treaty of Vienna (1656)
- Treaty of Vienna (1657)
- Treaty of Vienna (1725)
- Treaty of Vienna (1731)
- Treaty of Vienna (1738)
- Treaty of Vienna (1864)
- Treaty of Vienna (1866)

== Culture of Vienna ==
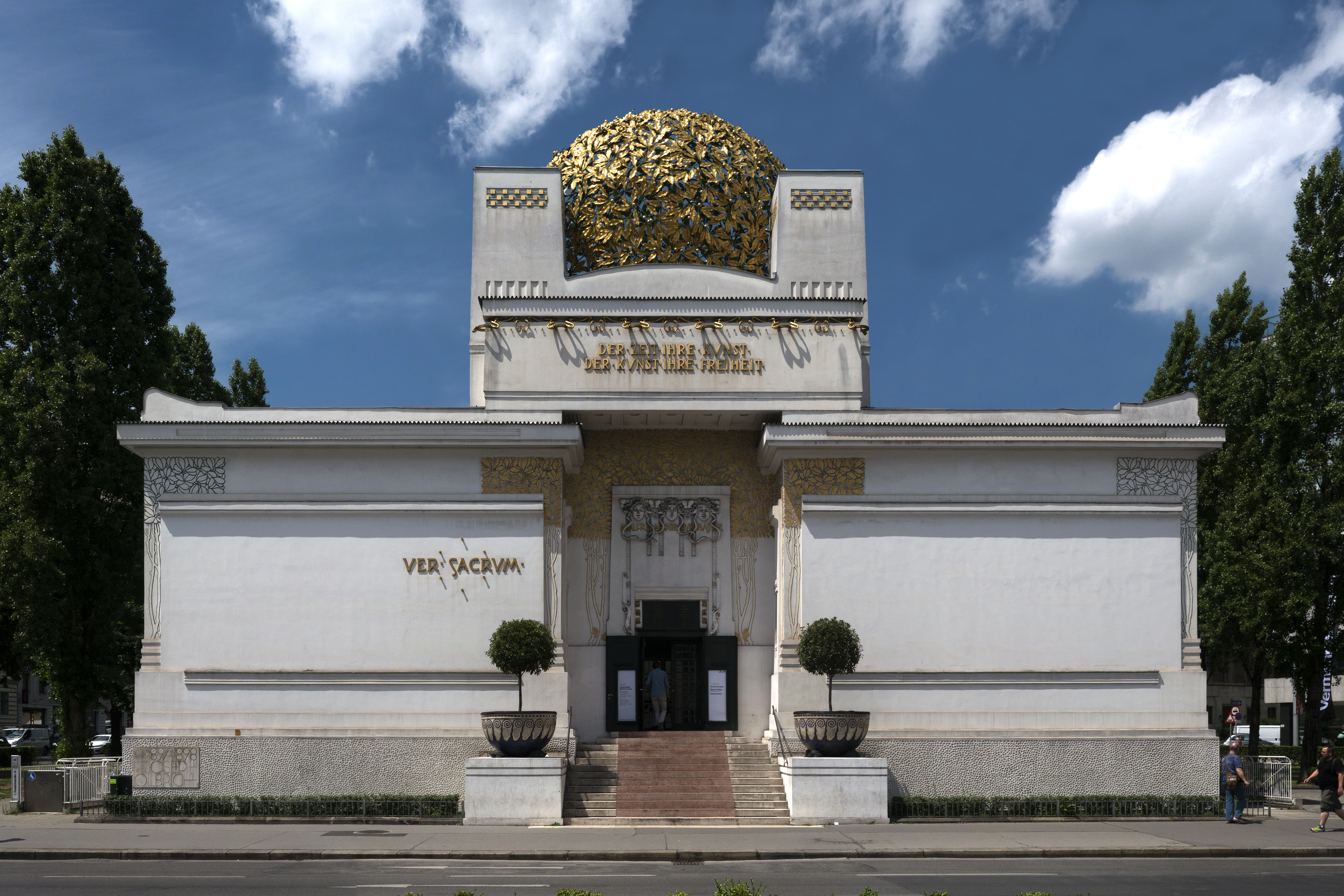
The Secession Building

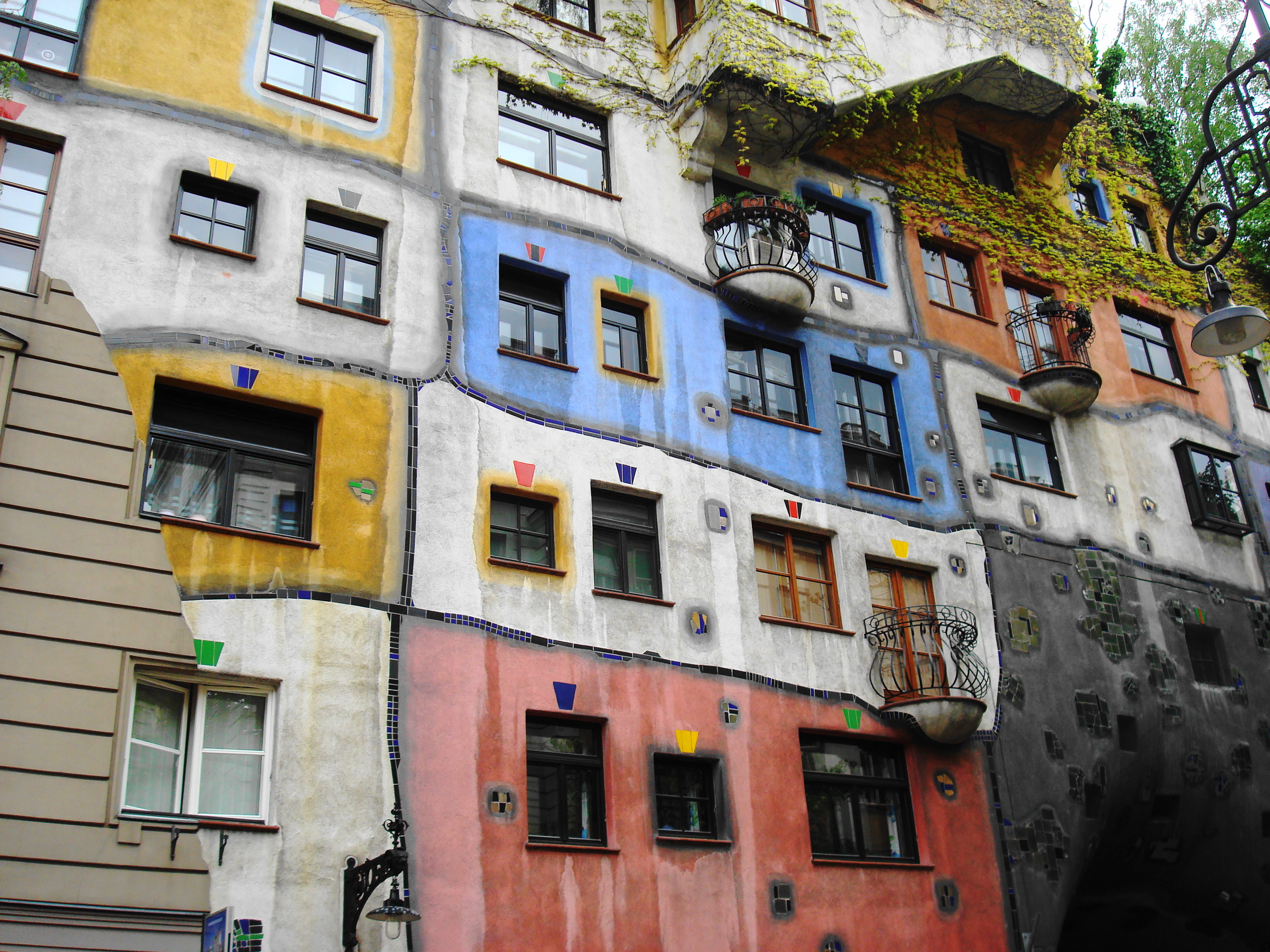
Hundertwasserhaus

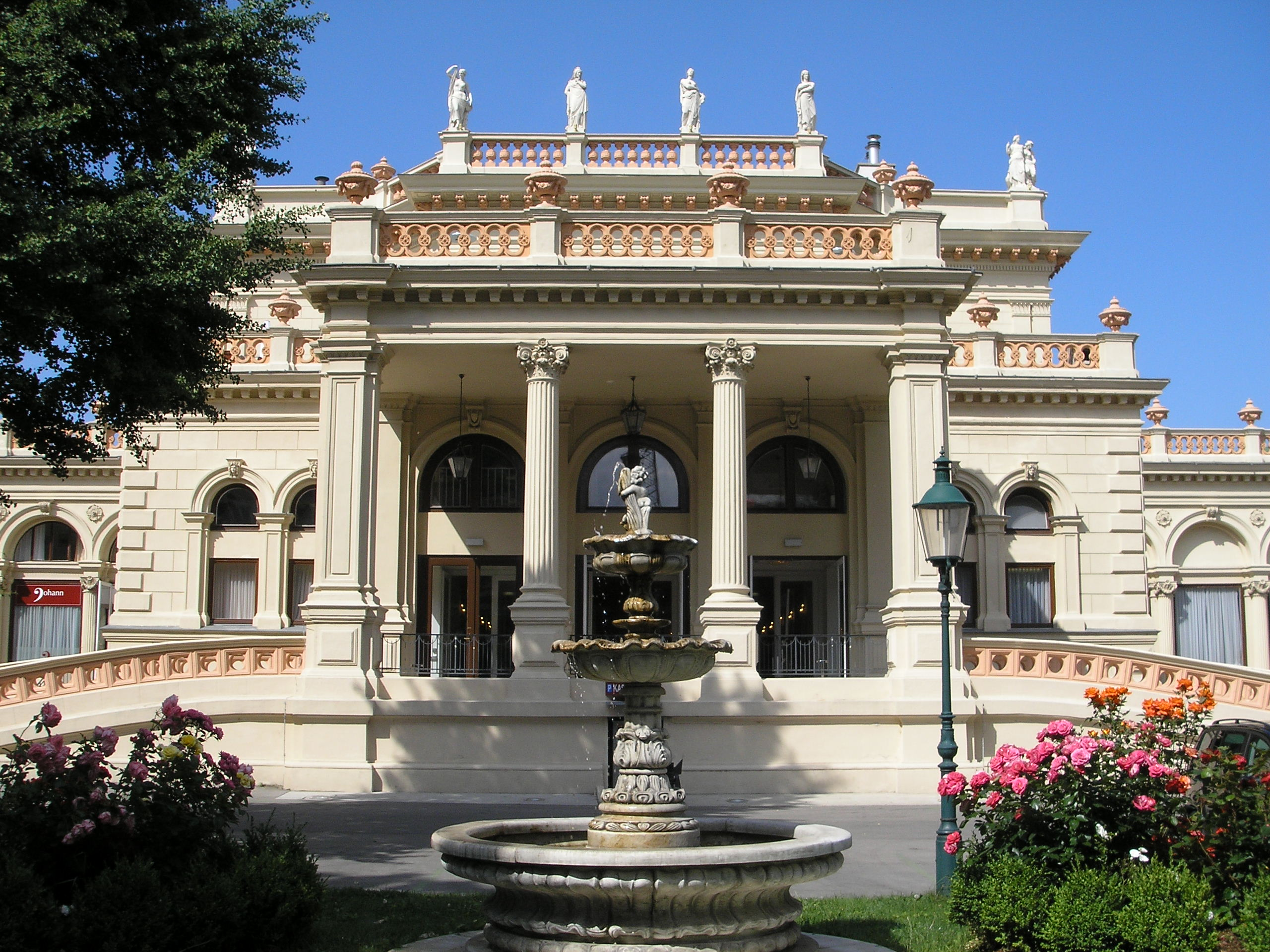
Kursalon Hübner

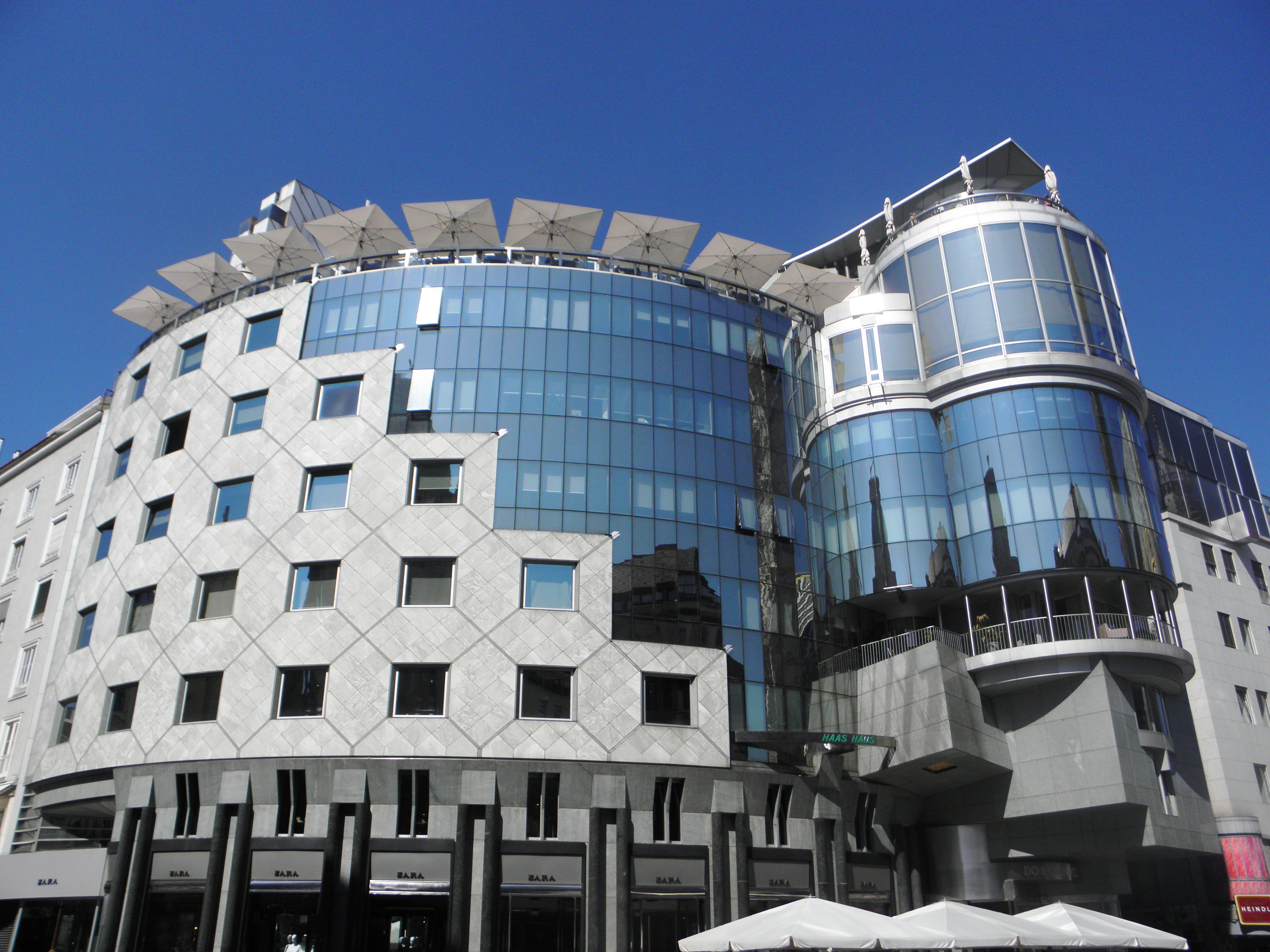
The Haas House

Culture of Vienna

=== Arts in Vienna ===
- Wiener Moderne

==== Architecture of Vienna ====
Architecture of Vienna

- Art Nouveau architecture in Vienna
  - Kirche am Steinhof
  - Secession Building
- Baroque architecture in Vienna
  - Karlskirche
- Expressionist architecture in Vienna
  - Hundertwasserhaus
- Gothic Revival architecture in Vienna
  - Rathaus
- Modern architecture in Vienna
  - DC Towers
  - Millennium Tower
- Neoclassical architecture in Vienna
  - Austrian Parliament Building
- Neo-Renaissance architecture in Vienna
  - Kursalon Hübner
- Postmodern architecture in Vienna
  - Haas House
- Romanesque architecture in Vienna
  - St. Rupert's Church

==== Cinema of Vienna ====
- Vienna International Film Festival
- Films set in Vienna

==== Literature of Vienna ====
- Young Vienna
- Wiener Gruppe

==== Music of Vienna ====
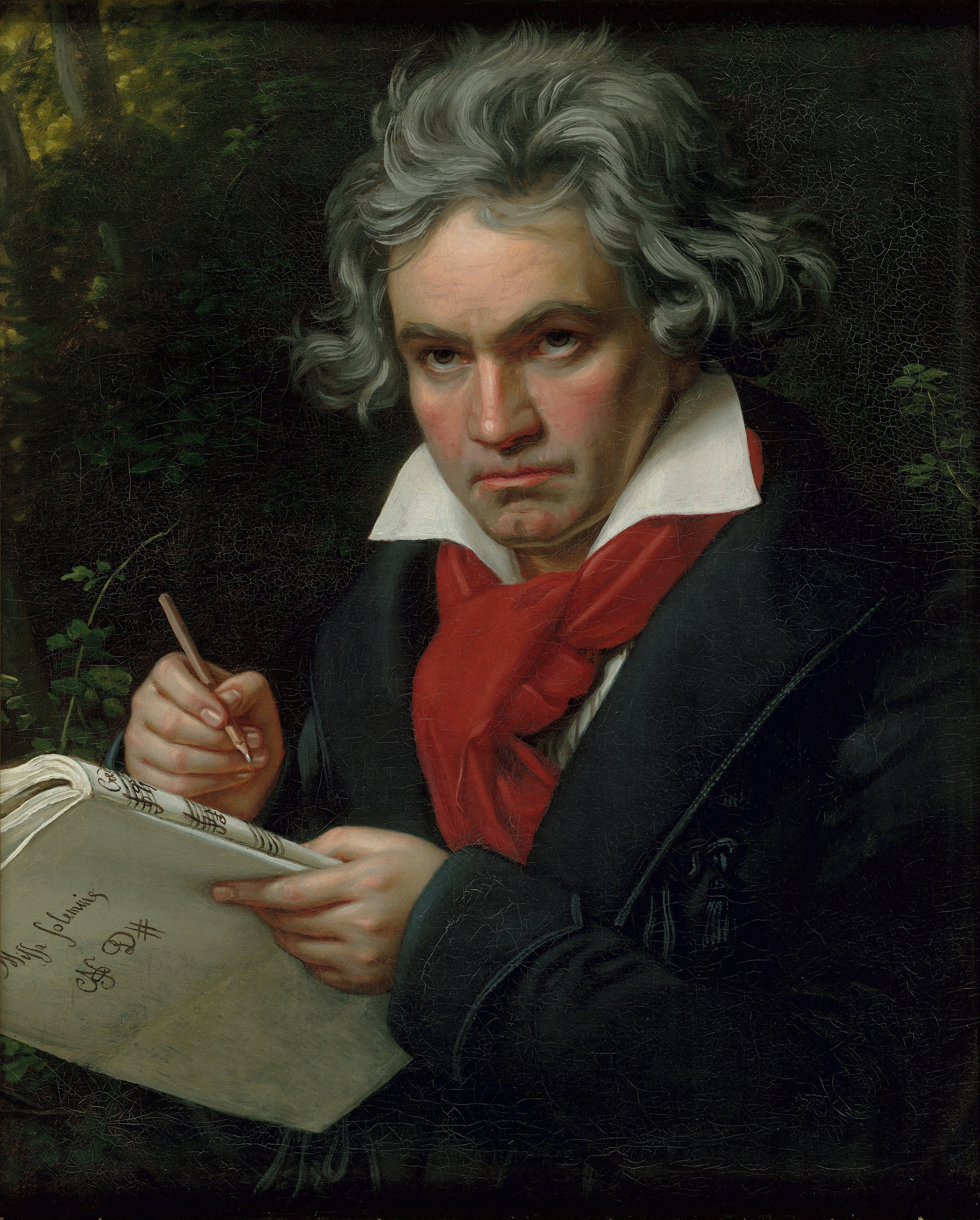
Ludwig van Beethoven spent much of his professional life in Vienna.

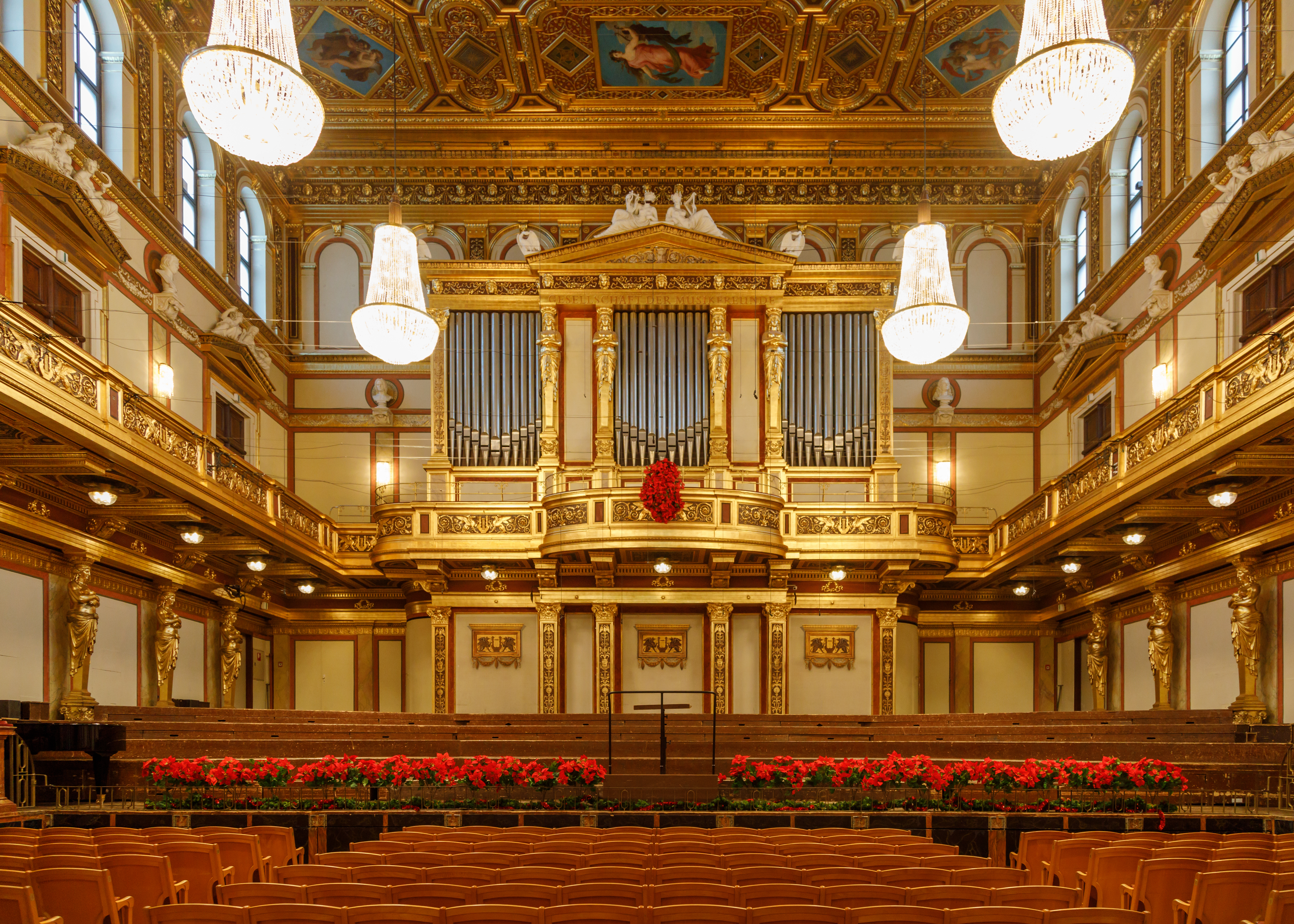
Musikverein, the Golden Hall

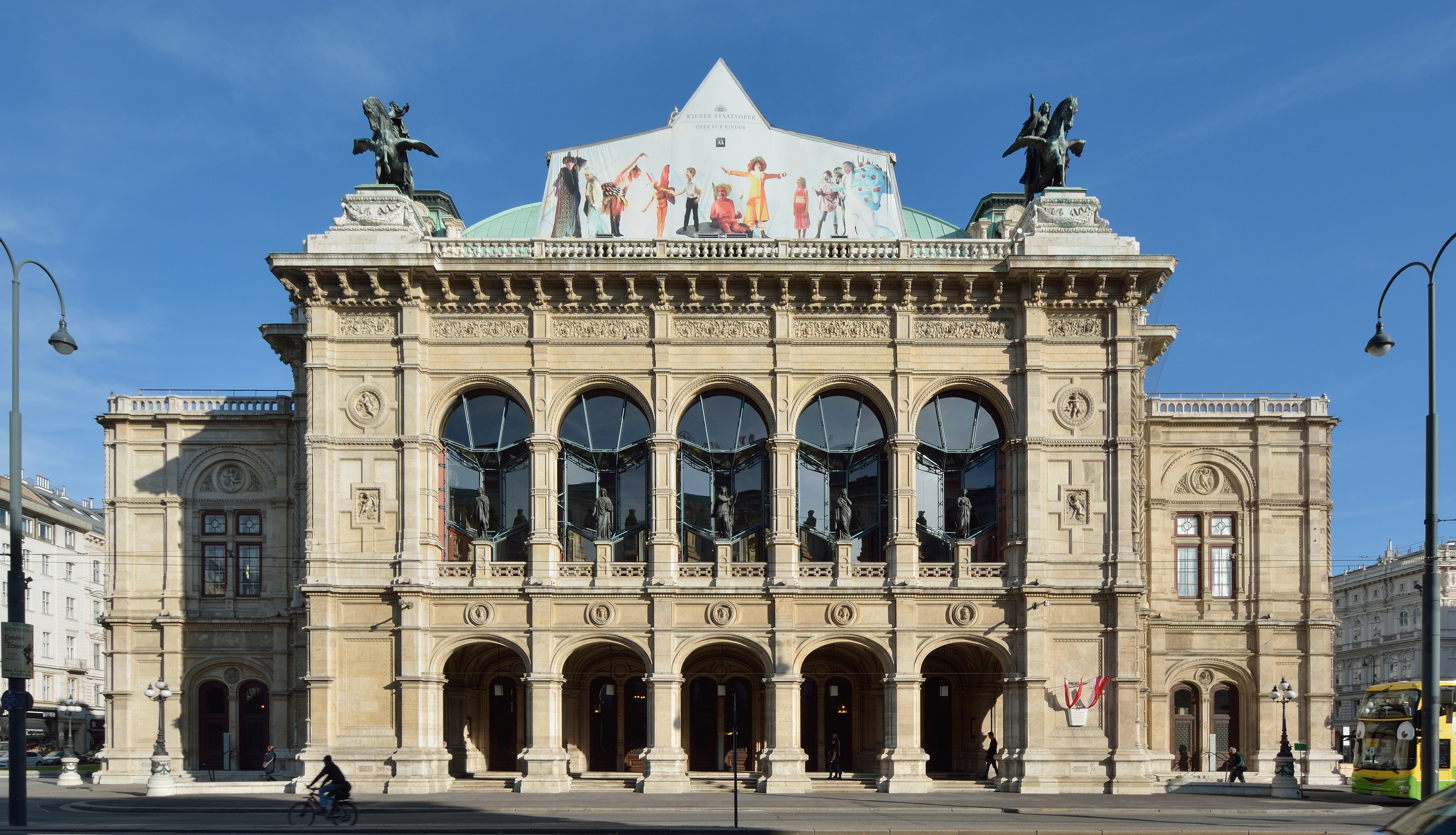
Vienna State Opera

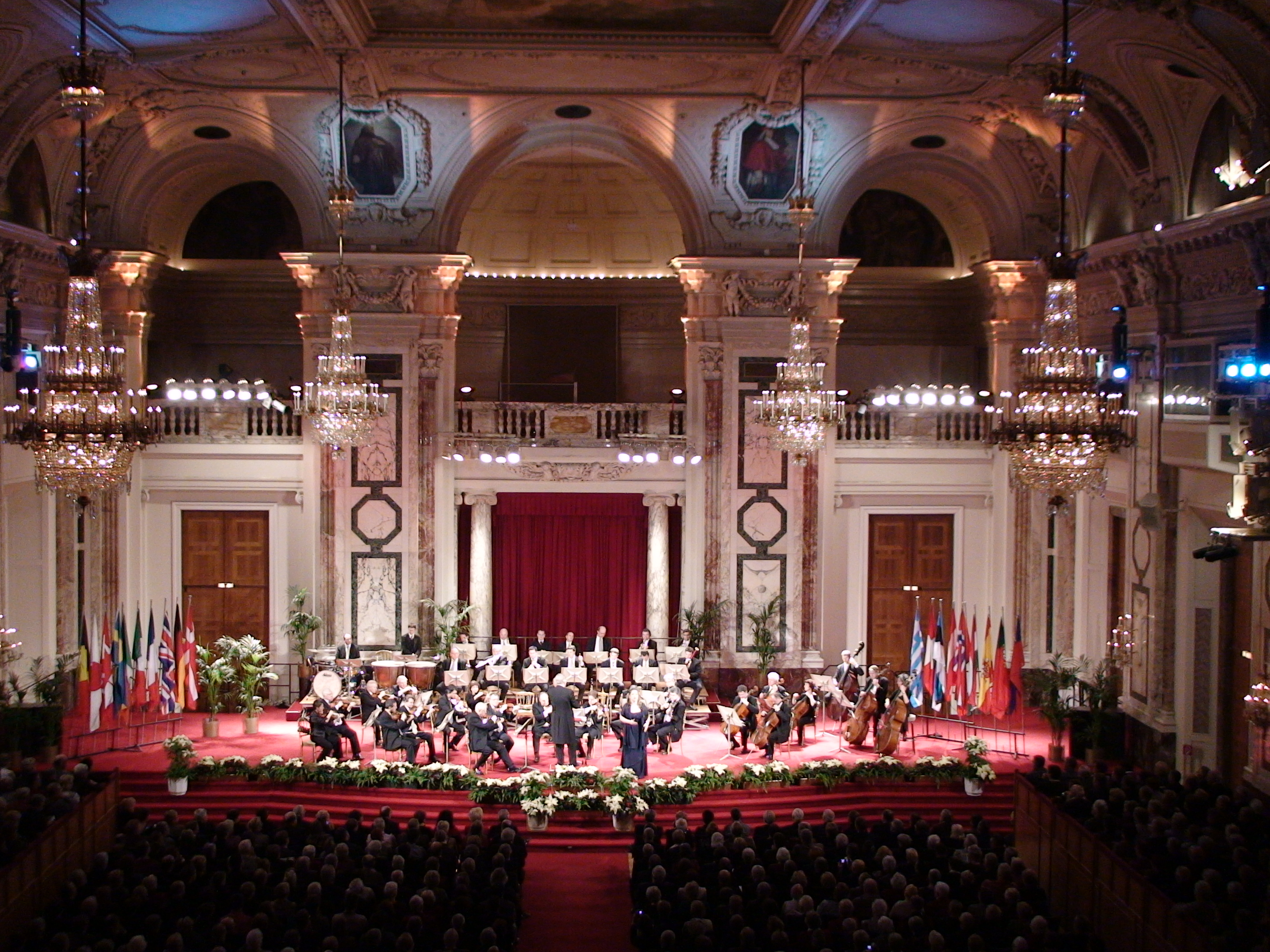
Vienna Hofburg Orchestra

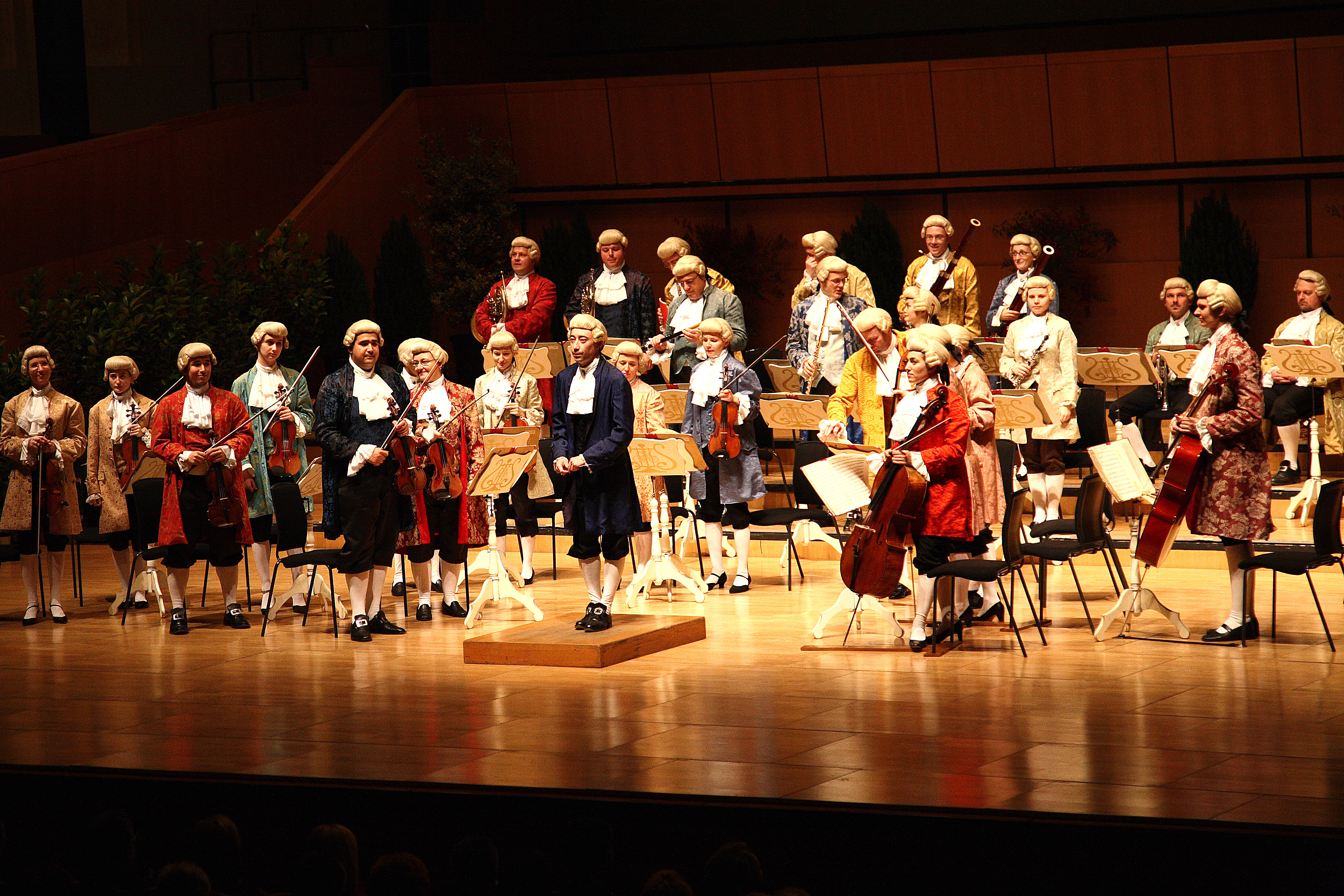
Vienna Mozart Orchestra

Music of Vienna

- Composers and musicians of Vienna
  - First Viennese School – refers to Vienna's greats from the classical period of music
    - Haydn
    - Mozart
    - Beethoven
    - Franz Schubert
  - Second Viennese School – Arnold Schoenberg and his students
    - Arnold Schoenberg
  - Third Viennese School
- Music genres originating in Vienna
  - Schrammelmusik
  - Viennese Waltz
  - Wienerlied
- Music venues in Vienna
  - Arena
  - Konzerthaus
  - Musikverein
    - Gesellschaft der Musikfreunde
  - Vienna State Opera
    - Vienna State Ballet
  - Vienna Volksoper
- Musical compositions set in Vienna
  - Wiener Blut (waltz)
  - The Blue Danube
- Musical ensembles in Vienna
  - Concentus Musicus Wien
  - Klangforum Wien
  - Neue Oper Wien
  - Orchester Wiener Akademie
  - Tonkünstler Orchestra
  - Vienna Boys' Choir
  - Vienna Hofburg Orchestra
  - Vienna Mozart Orchestra
  - Vienna Philharmonic
    - Summer Night Concert Schönbrunn
    - Vienna New Year's Concert
    - Wiener Klangstil
  - Vienna Radio Symphony Orchestra
  - Vienna Symphony
  - Wiener Singakademie
  - Wiener Taschenoper

==== Theatre of Vienna ====
Theatre of Vienna

==== Visual arts of Vienna ====
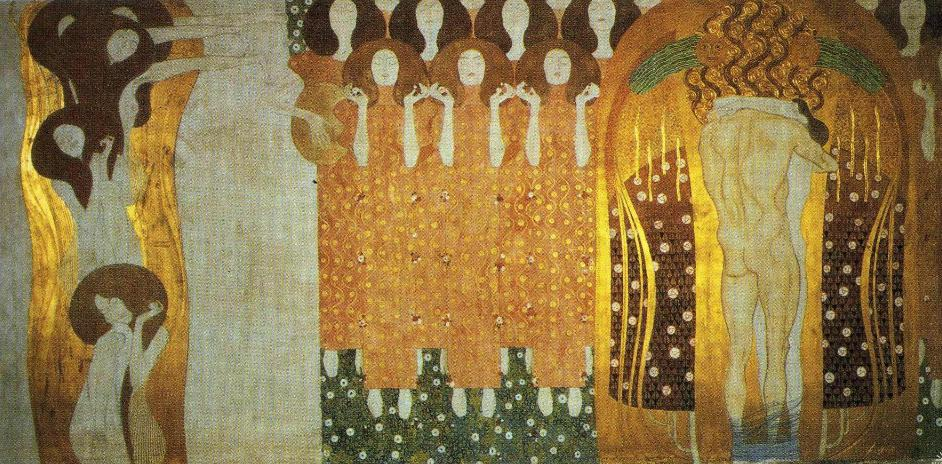
Beethoven Frieze, a painting by Gustav Klimt, one of the founders of the Vienna Secession art movement

- Academy of Fine Arts Vienna
- museum in progress
- Vienna School of Fantastic Realism
- Vienna Secession
- Viennese Actionism
- Wiener Werkstätte

=== Cuisine of Vienna ===
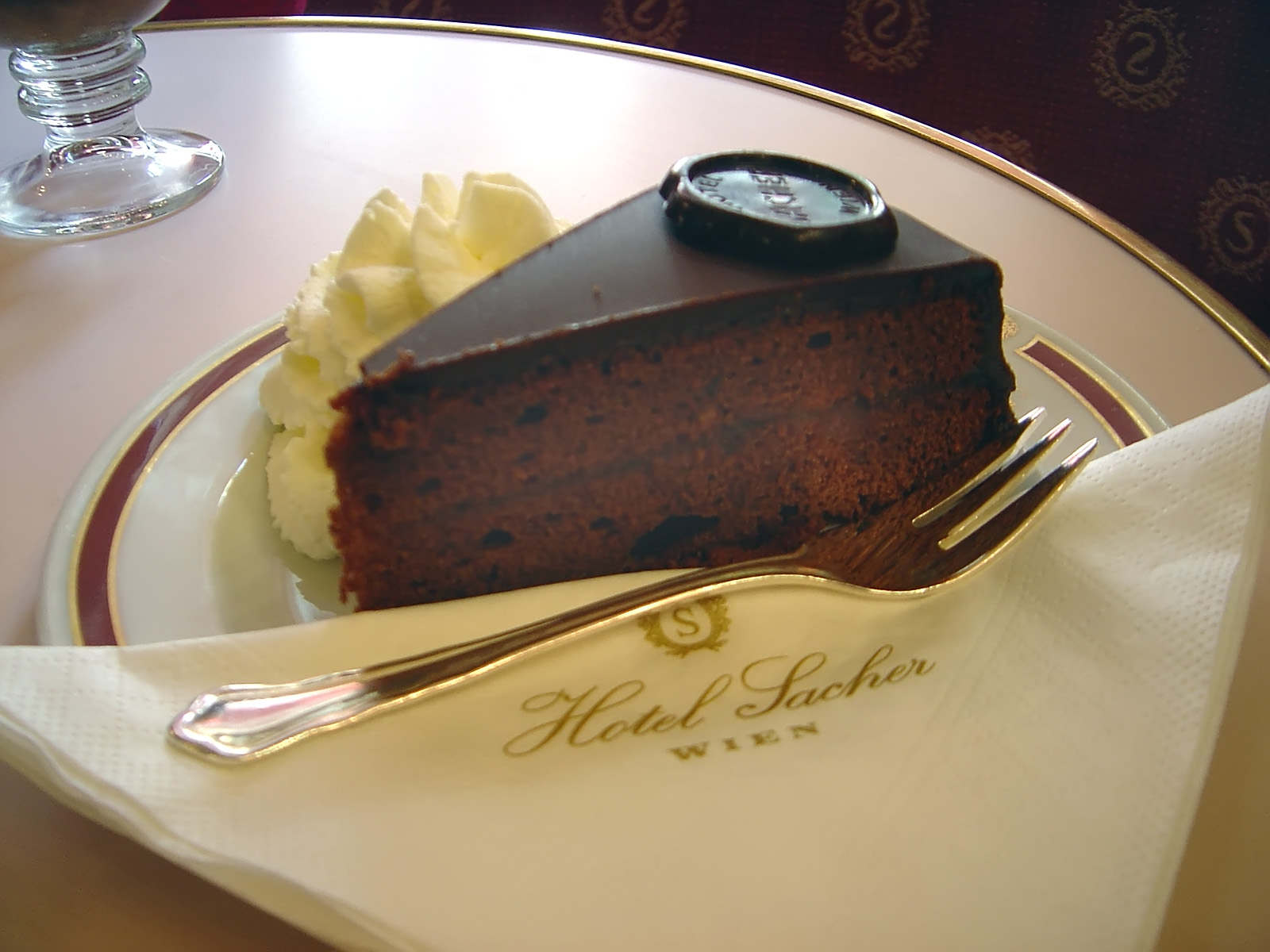
The original Sachertorte, as served at Vienna's Hotel Sacher

Cuisine of Vienna

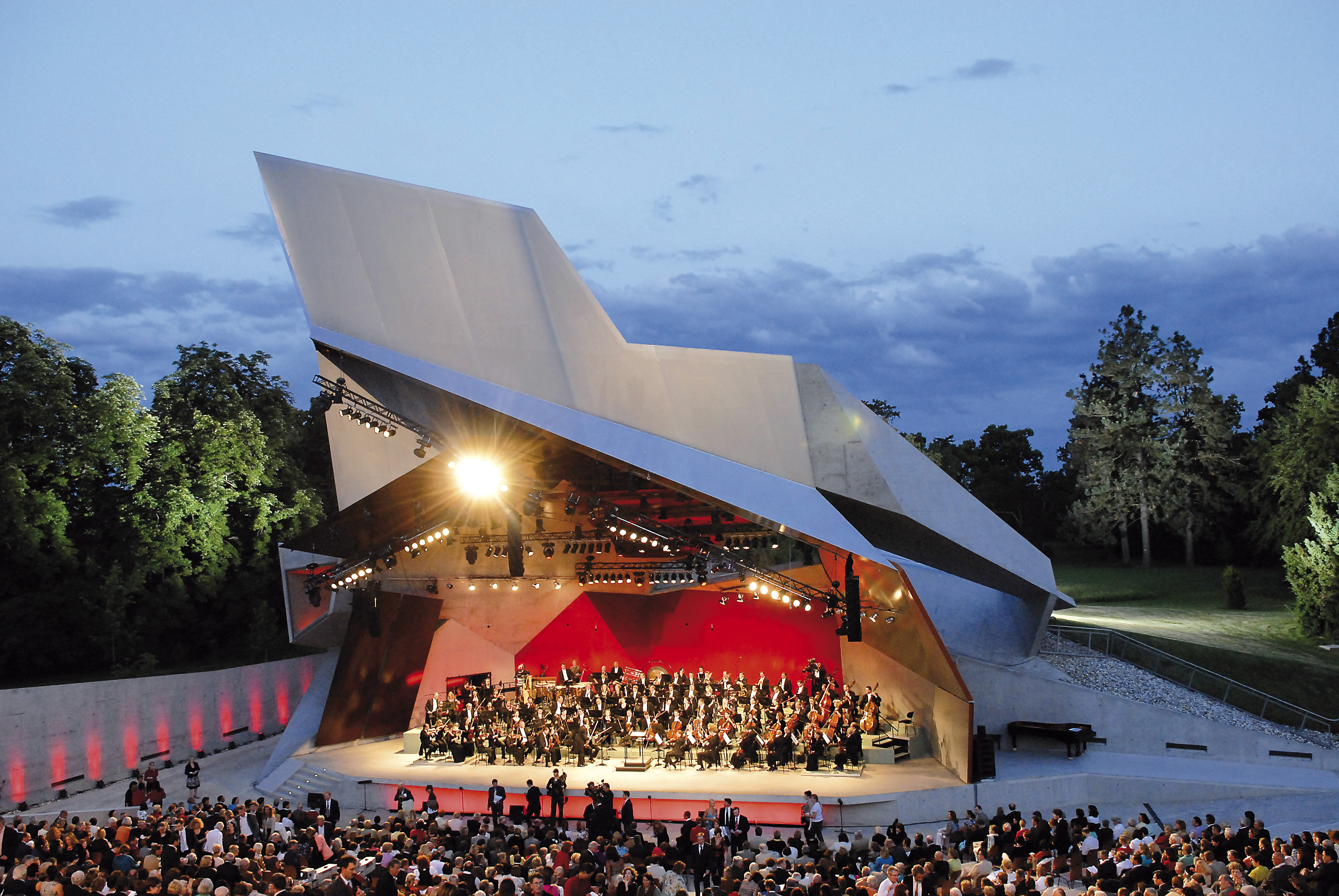
Grafenegg Festival, the open-air stage "Wolkenturm"

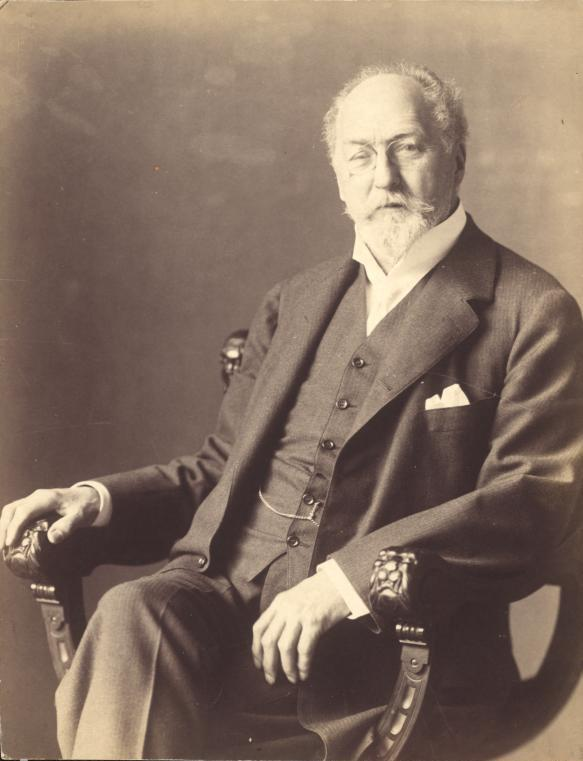
Otto Wagner, Austrian architect who contributed many landmarks to his home town Vienna

- Culinary specialities
- Popular dishes of Vienna

=== Events in Vienna ===
Events in Vienna

- Donauinselfest
- Donaukanaltreiben Festival
- Grafenegg Festival
- ImPulsTanz Vienna International Dance Festival
- Jazz Fest Wien
- Vienna Biennale
- Vienna Festival
- Vienna International Film Festival
- Vienna Nightrow
- Vienna Spring Festival
- Wien Modern
- Wiener Internationale Gartenschau 74

=== Languages of Vienna ===
Languages of Vienna

- Viennese German

=== Media in Vienna ===
Media in Vienna

- Newspapers in Vienna
  - Der Standard
  - Die Presse
  - Wiener Zeitung
- Radio and television in Vienna
  - ORF

=== People of Vienna ===
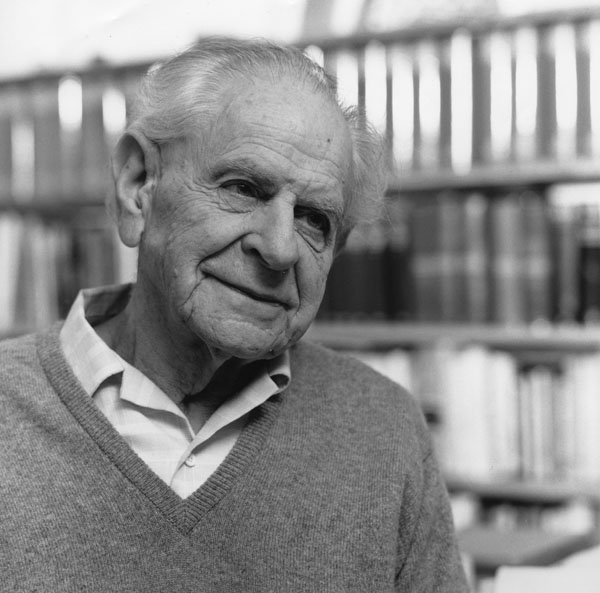
Sir Karl Popper, born in Vienna in 1902, played an important role in establishing the philosophy of science.

People of Vienna

- List of honorary citizens of Vienna
- List of people from Vienna

=== Philosophy of Vienna ===
Philosophy of Vienna

- Vienna Circle
  - Logical positivism

=== Religion in Vienna ===
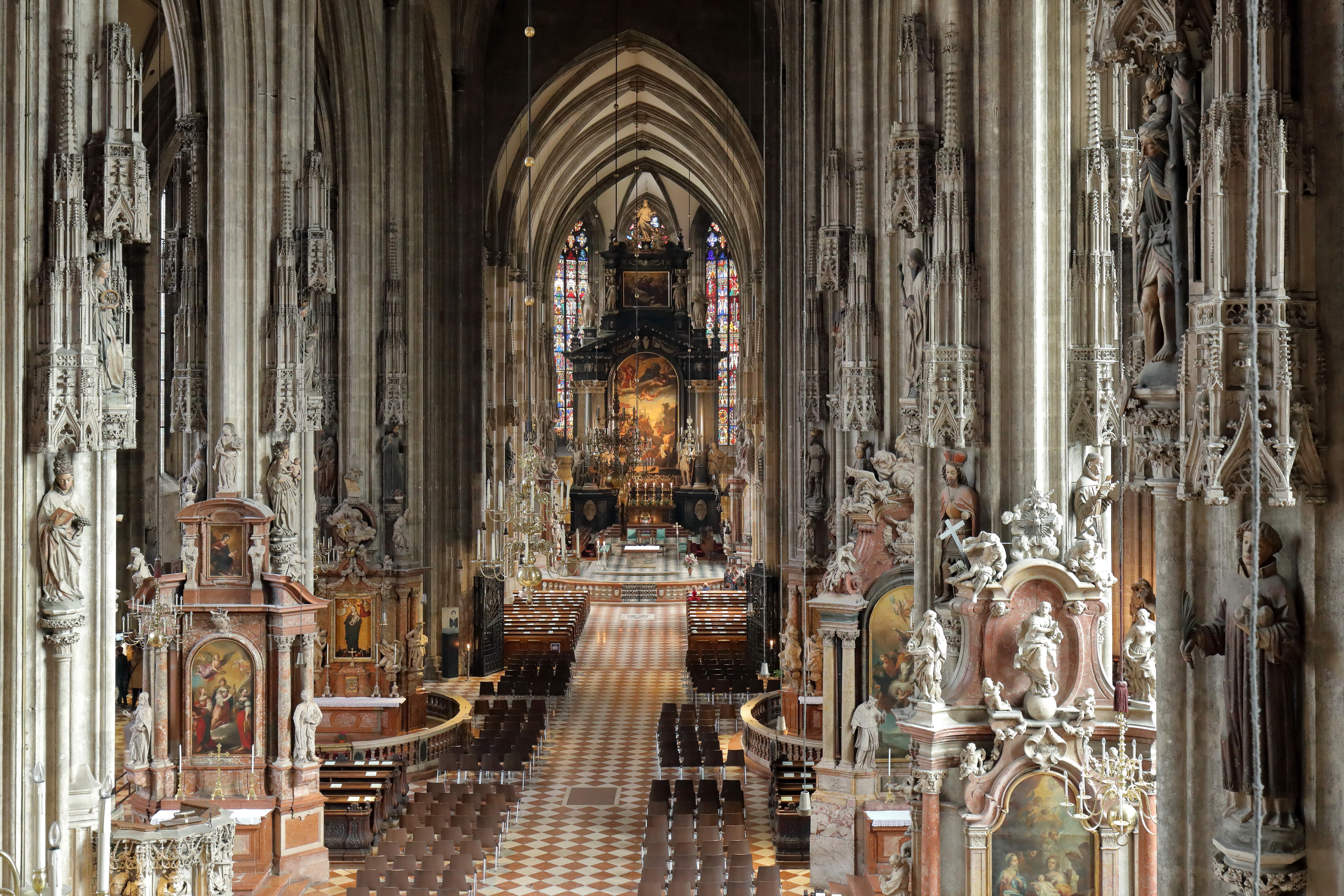
Interior of the St. Stephen's Cathedral

Religion in Vienna

- Catholicism in Vienna
  - Roman Catholic Archdiocese of Vienna
    - Archbishop of Vienna
    - St. Stephen's Cathedral
- Protestantism in Vienna
  - Lutheran City Church
- Buddhism in Vienna
  - Peace Pagoda
- Islam in Vienna
  - Vienna Islamic Centre

=== Sports in Vienna ===
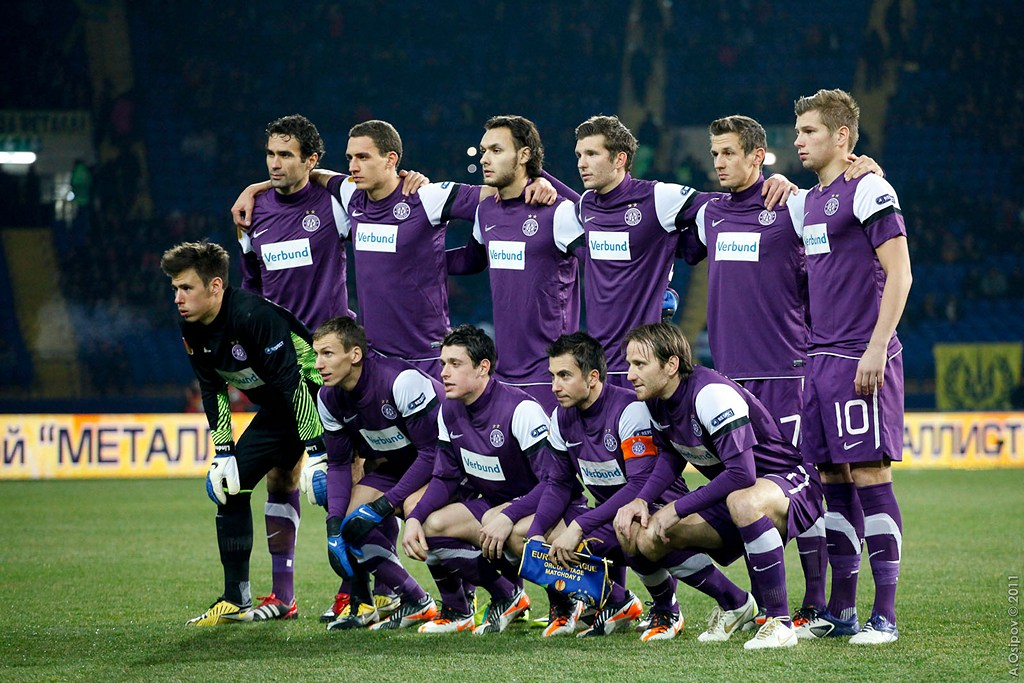
The FK Austria Wien team in 2011

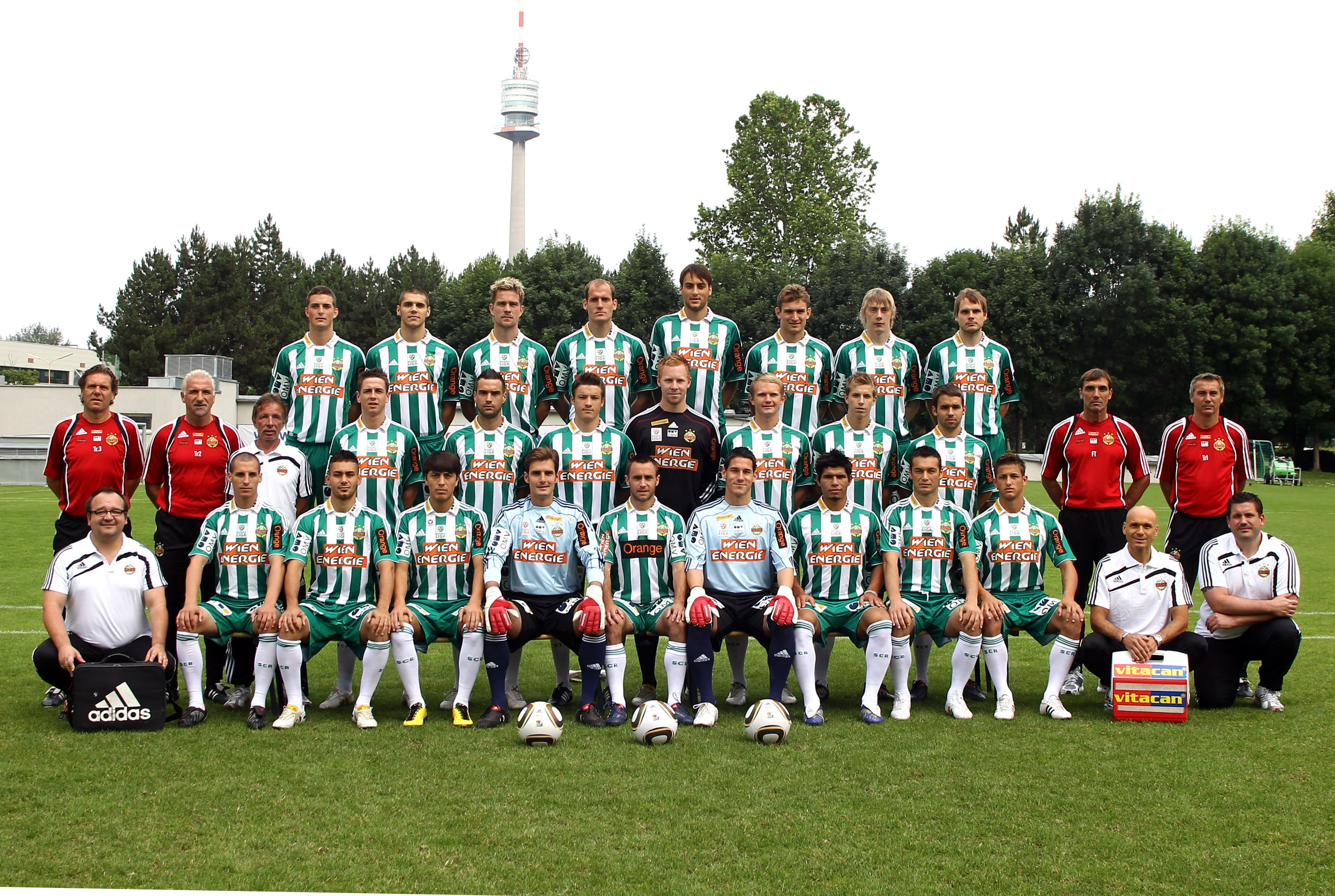
The SK Rapid Wien team in 2010

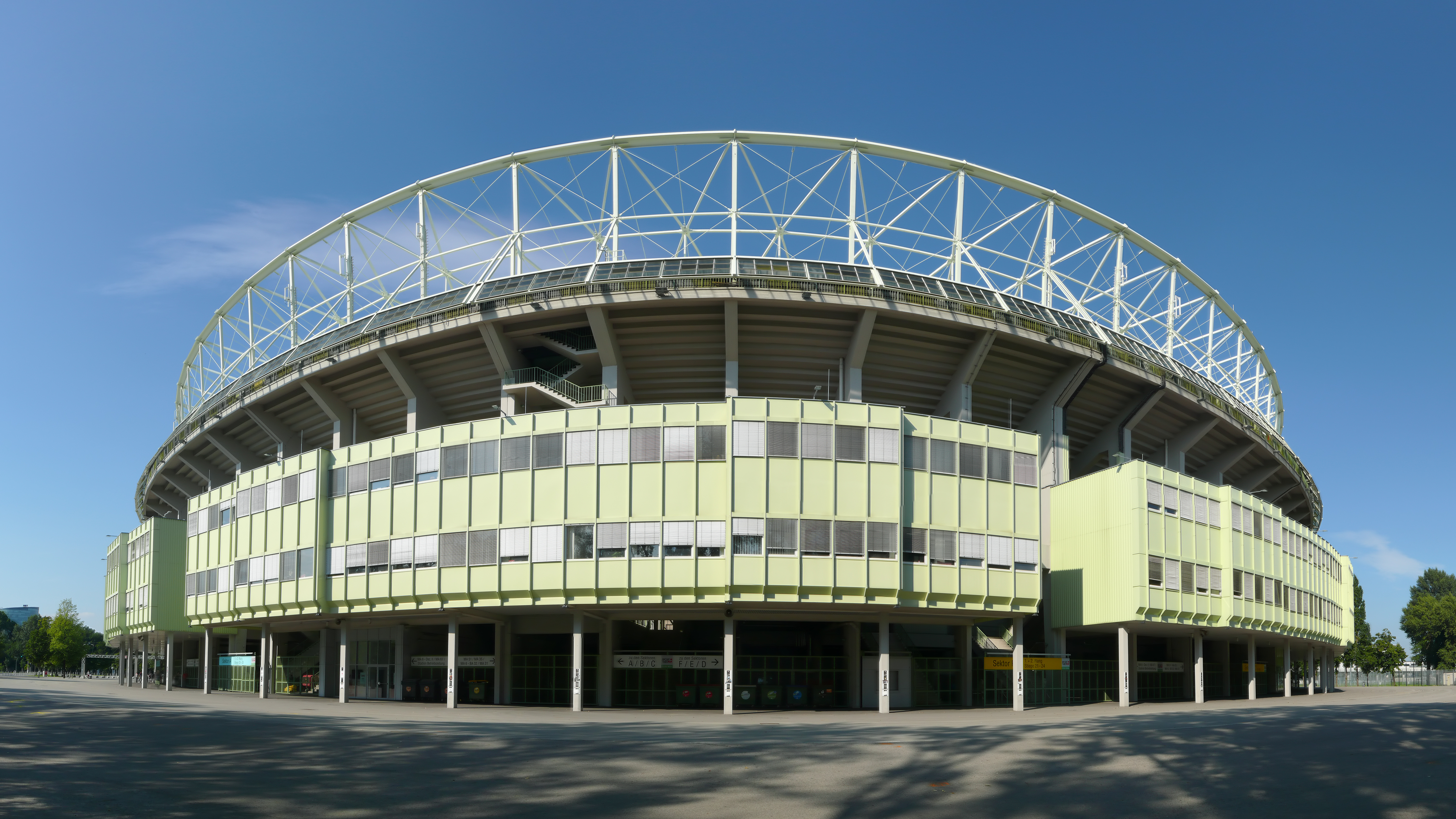
Ernst-Happel-Stadion

Sport in Vienna

- Basketball in Vienna
  - BC Vienna
- Football in Vienna
  - Austrian Football Bundesliga
    - FK Austria Wien
    - SK Rapid Wien
  - Vienna derby
- Rugby football in Vienna
  - Vienna Celtic RFC
- Ice hockey in Vienna
  - Vienna Capitals
- Running in Vienna
  - Vienna City Marathon
- Tennis in Vienna
  - Vienna Open
- Sports venues in Vienna
  - Albert Schultz Eishalle
  - Allianz Stadion
  - Ernst-Happel-Stadion
  - Franz Horr Stadium
  - Hohe Warte Stadium
  - Trabrennbahn Krieau
  - Vienna Watersports Arena
  - Wiener Stadthalle

== Economy and infrastructure of Vienna ==
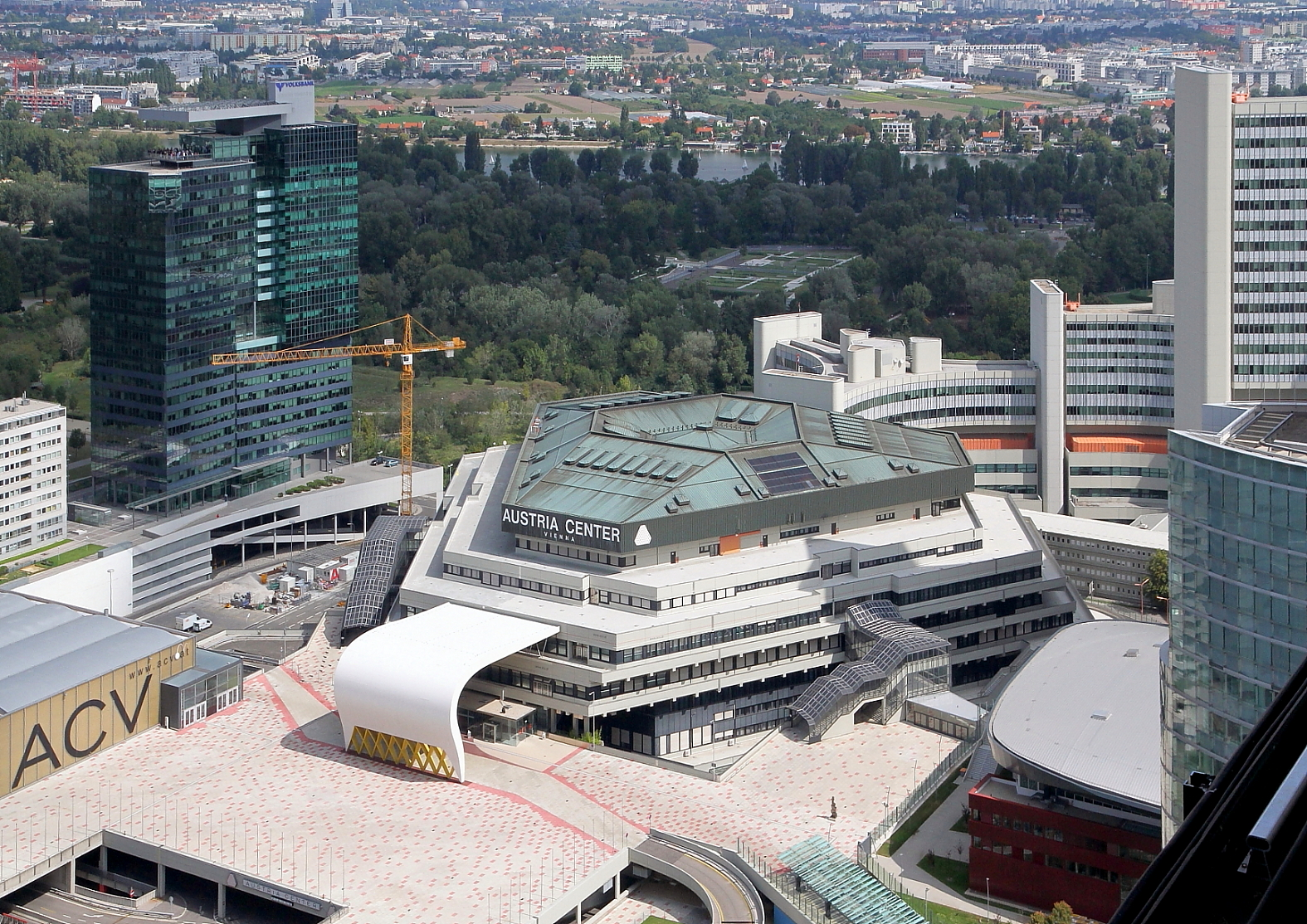
Austria Center Vienna (ACV)

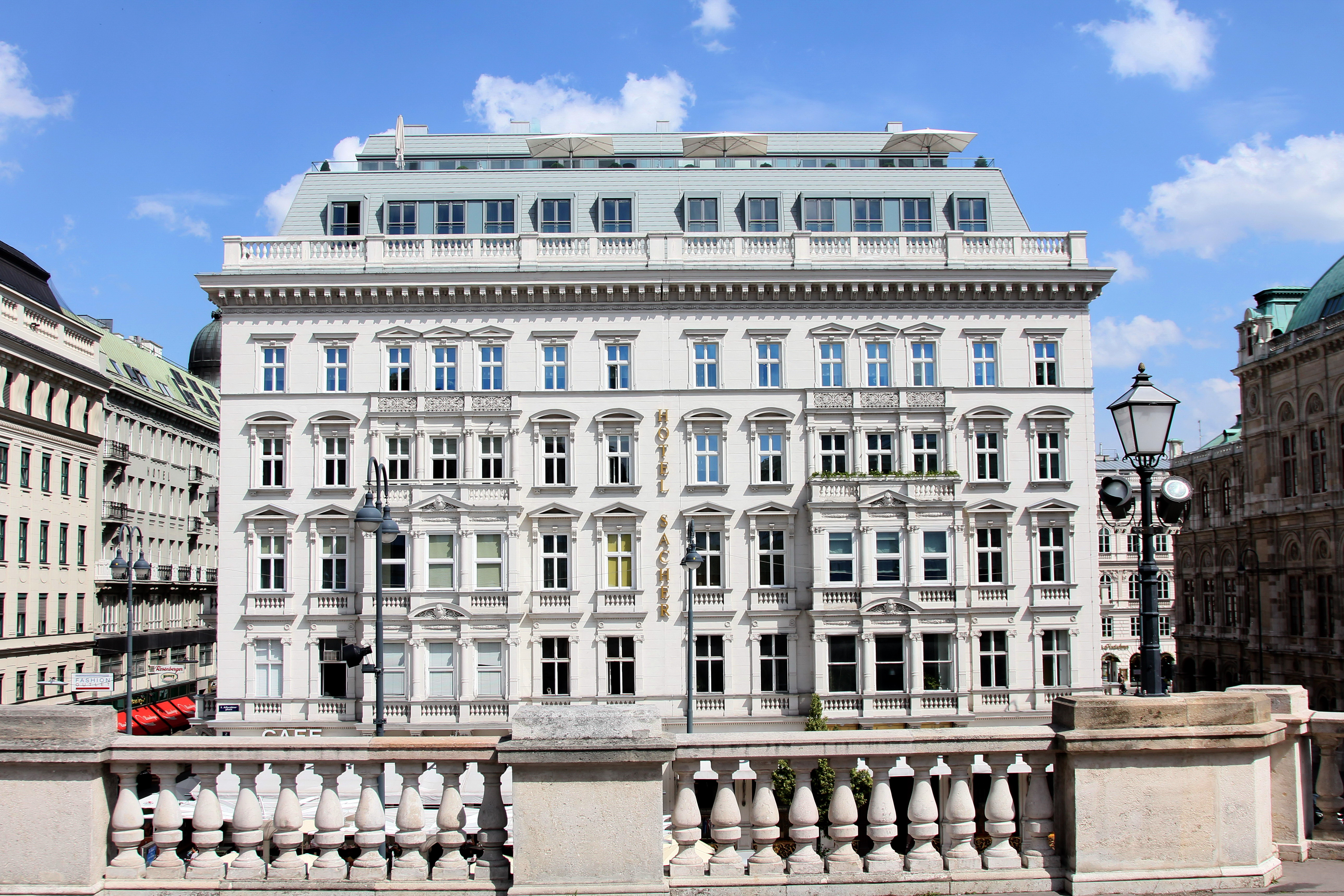
Hotel Sacher

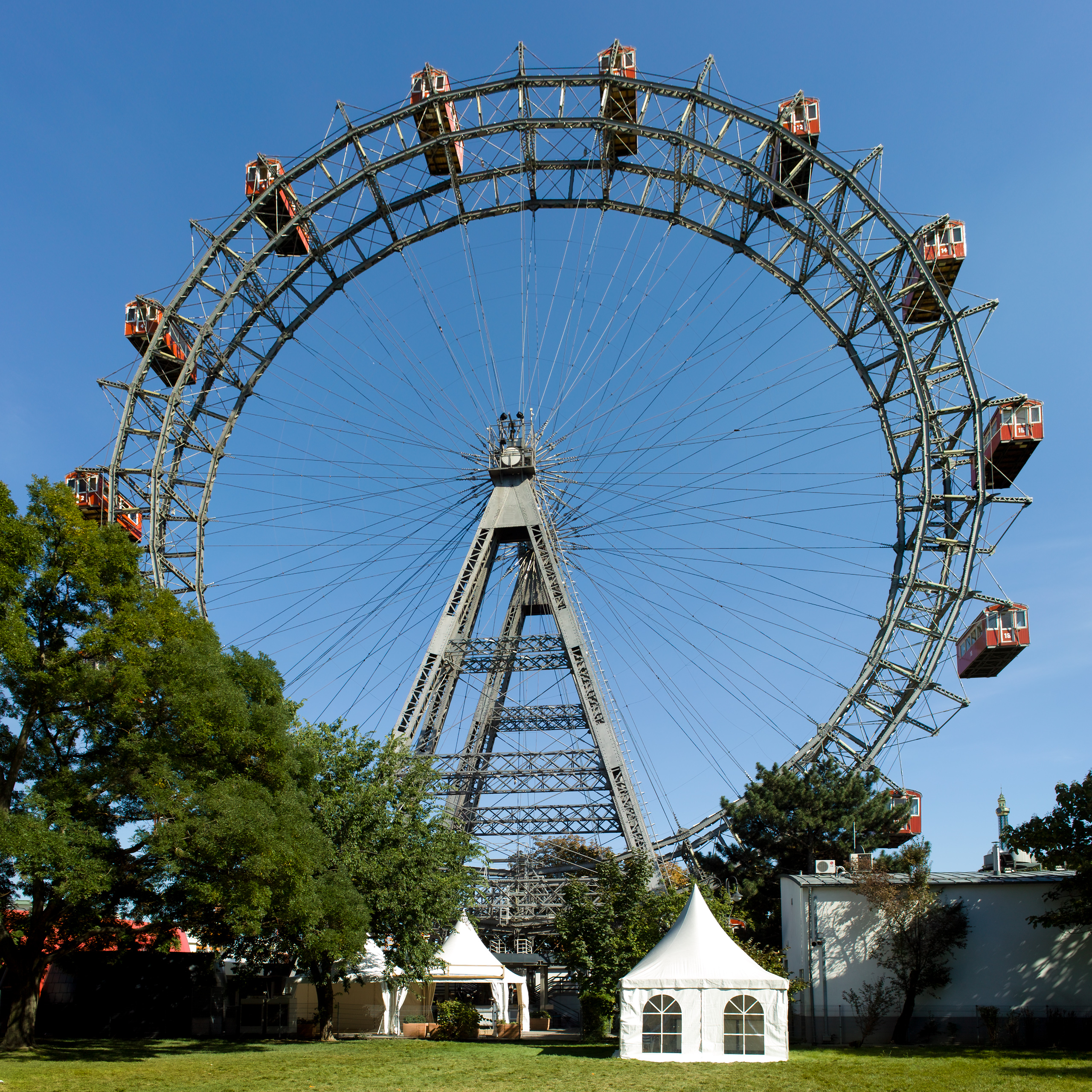
The Wiener Riesenrad, one of Vienna's most popular tourist attractions

Economy of Vienna

- Congress and Convention location
  - Austria Center Vienna (ACV)
- Financial services in Vienna
  - Bank Austria
  - Vienna Insurance Group
  - Wiener Börse
- Hotels in Vienna
  - Grand Hotel Wien
  - Hotel Imperial
  - Hotel Sacher
  - InterContinental Vienna
  - Schloss Wilhelminenberg
- Restaurants and cafés in Vienna
  - Restaurants in Vienna
    - Griechenbeisl
    - Schweizerhaus
  - Viennese coffee houses in Vienna
    - Café Central
    - Café Restaurant Residenz
    - Café Schwarzenberg
- Shopping malls and markets in Vienna
  - Kärntner Straße
    - Steffl Department Store Vienna
  - Naschmarkt
- Tourism in Vienna
  - Tourist attractions in Vienna

=== Transportation in Vienna ===
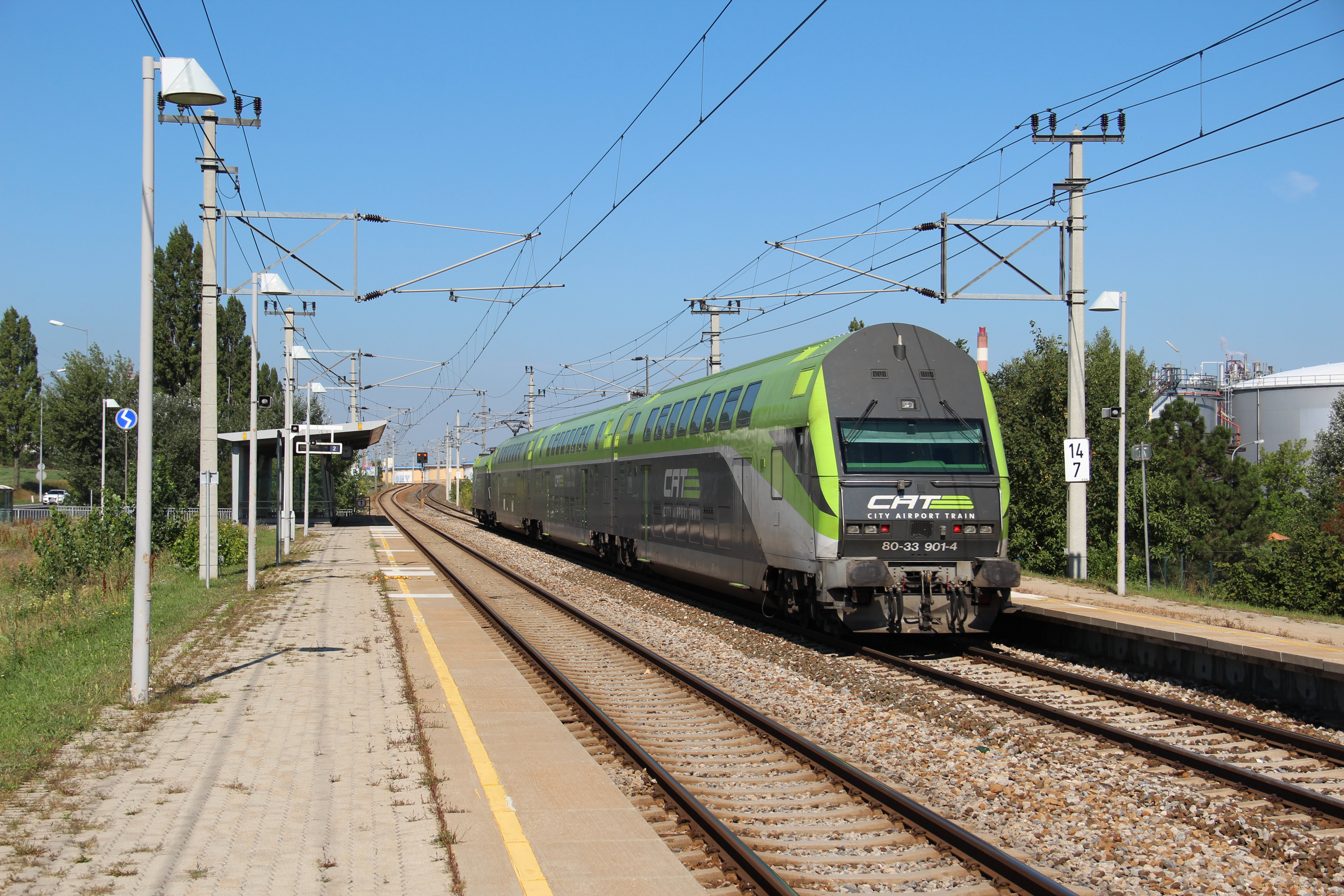
The City Airport Train (CAT)

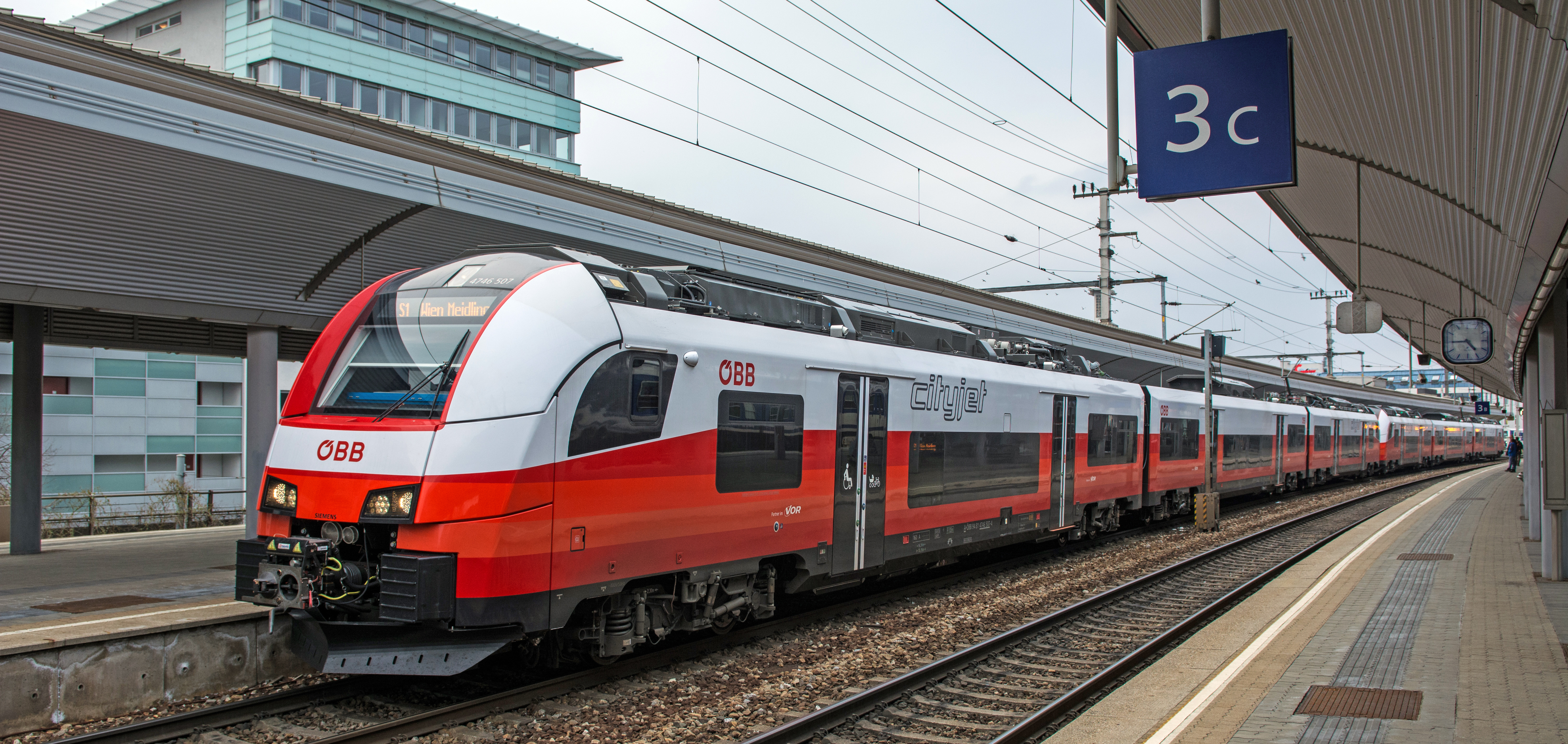
S1 cityjet EMU at Floridsdorf station

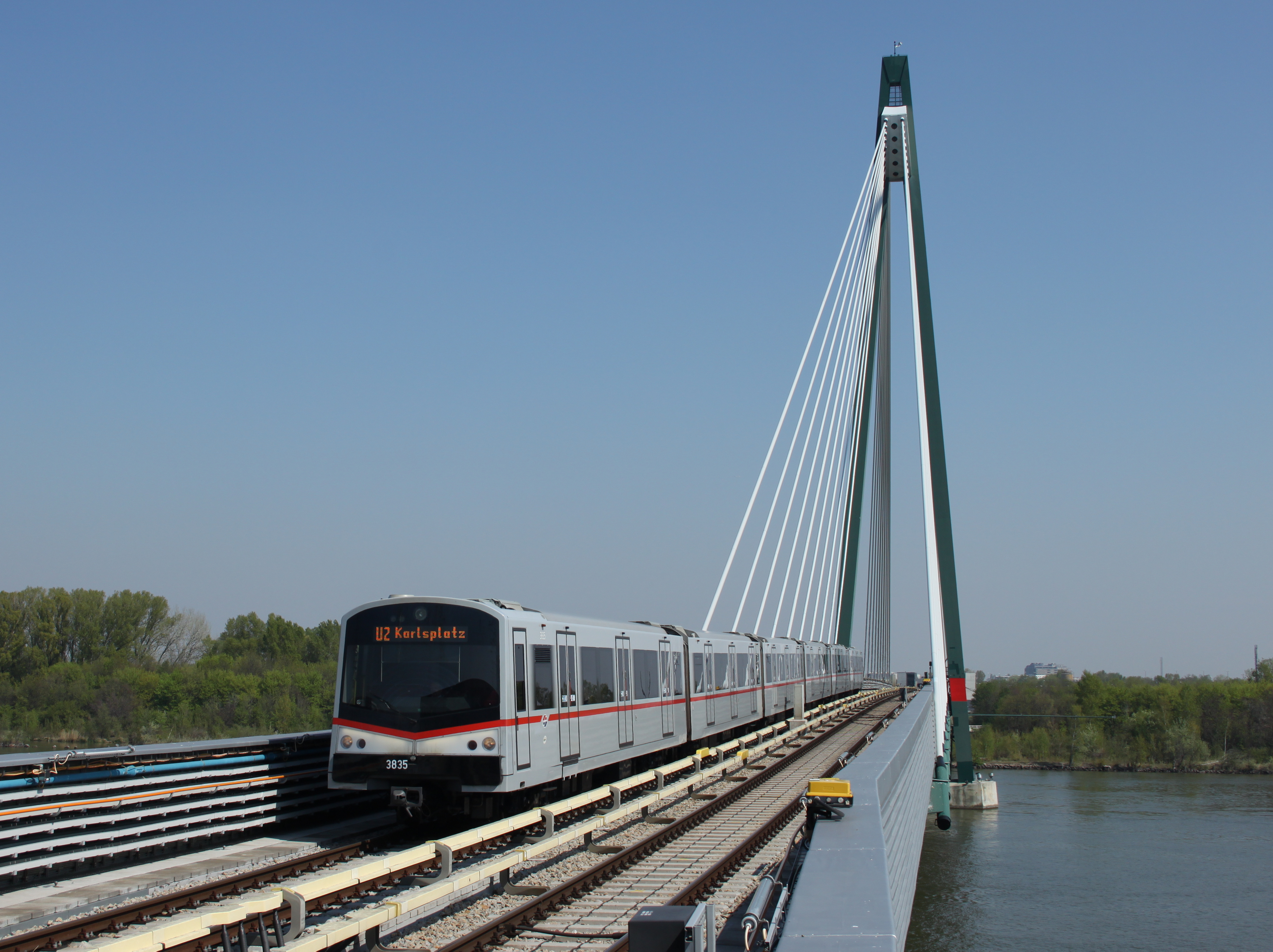
U2 train at the Donaustadtbrücke

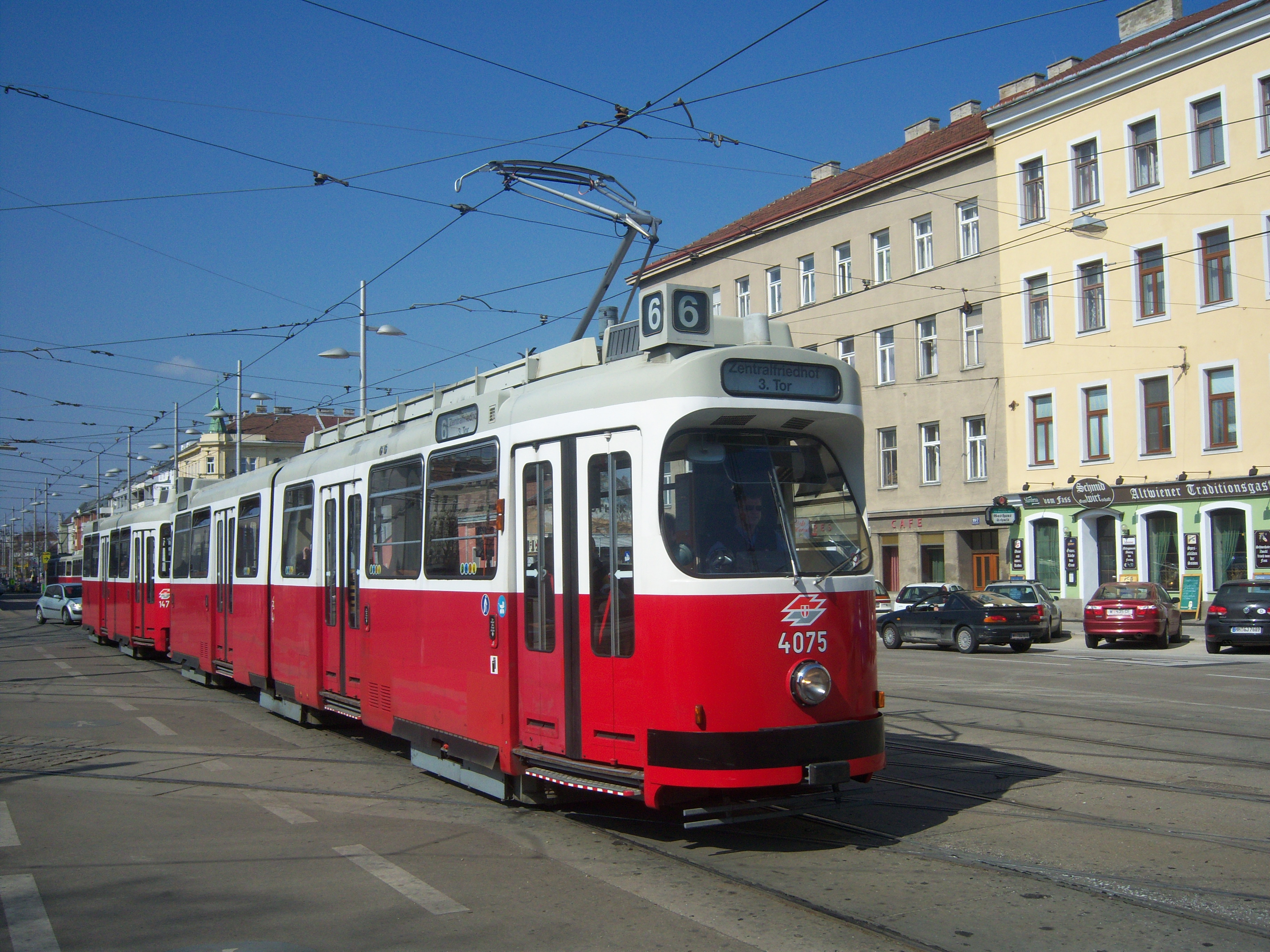
E2 type tramcar

Transportation in Vienna

- Public transport in Vienna
  - Public transport operators in Vienna
    - Wiener Linien
    - Wiener Lokalbahnen
- Air transport in Vienna
  - Airports in Vienna
    - Vienna International Airport
- Maritime transport in Vienna
  - River ports and harbours in Vienna
    - Harbours in Vienna
    - Port of Vienna
  - Shipping lines serving Vienna
    - Twin City Liner
- Road transport in Vienna
  - Bus transport in Vienna
  - Car sharing in Vienna
    - DriveNow
  - Vienna Ring Road

==== Rail transport in Vienna ====
Rail transport in Vienna

- City Airport Train
- Vienna S-Bahn
- Vienna U-Bahn
  - List of Vienna U-Bahn stations
- Wiener Lokalbahn
- Railway stations in Vienna
  - Wien Hauptbahnhof
  - Wien Mitte railway station
  - Wien Westbahnhof railway station
- Trams in Vienna

== Education in Vienna ==
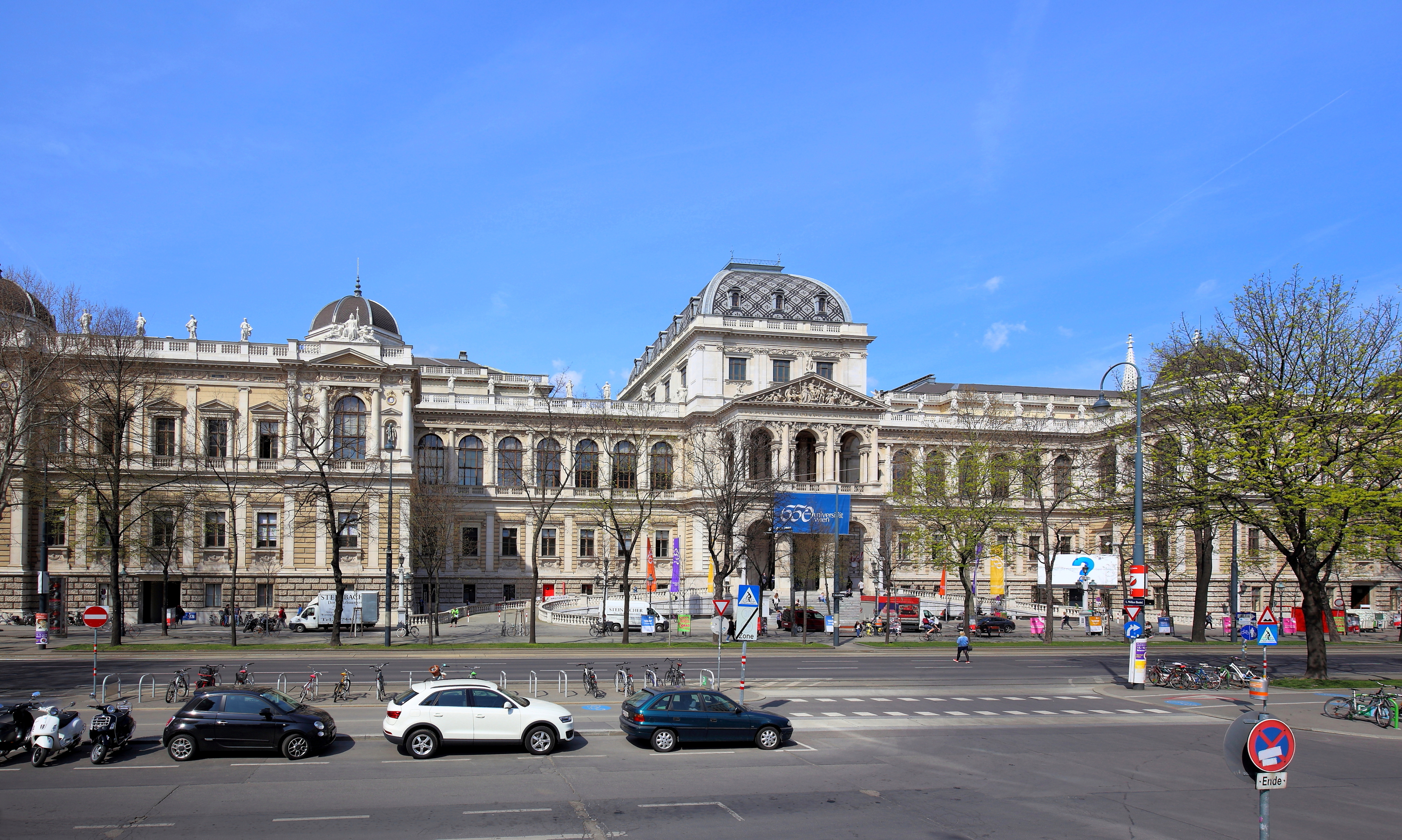
Main building of the University of Vienna

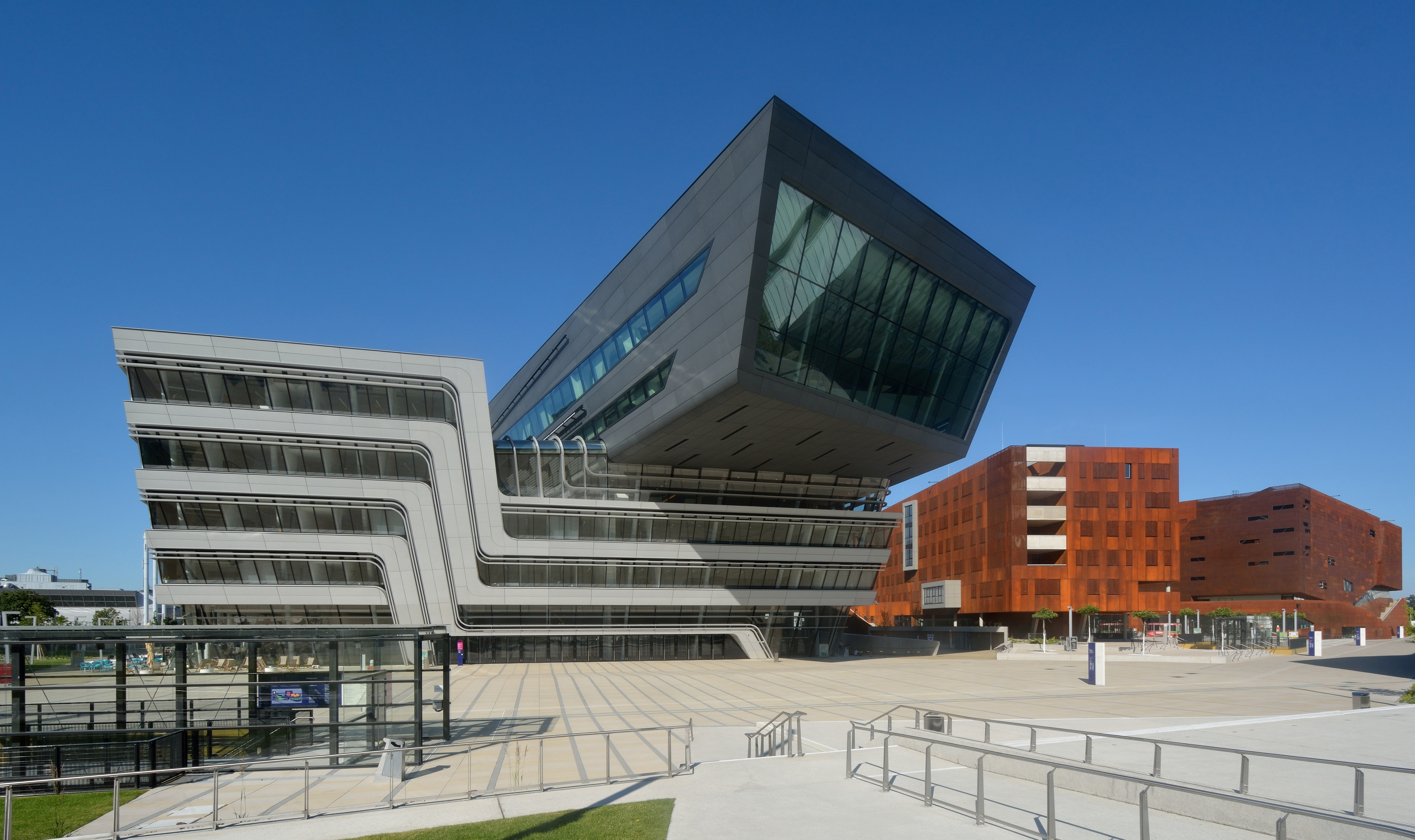
The Vienna University of Economics and Business

Education in Vienna

- Universities in Vienna
  - Medical University of Vienna
  - Music and Arts University of the City of Vienna
  - TU Wien
  - University of Applied Arts Vienna
  - University of Music and Performing Arts Vienna
  - University of Vienna
    - Vienna Observatory
  - Vienna University of Economics and Business
- Research institutes in Vienna
  - Austrian Institute of Technology
  - Erwin Schrödinger International Institute for Mathematical Physics
  - Institute Vienna Circle
  - Vienna Institute of Demography

== Healthcare in Vienna ==
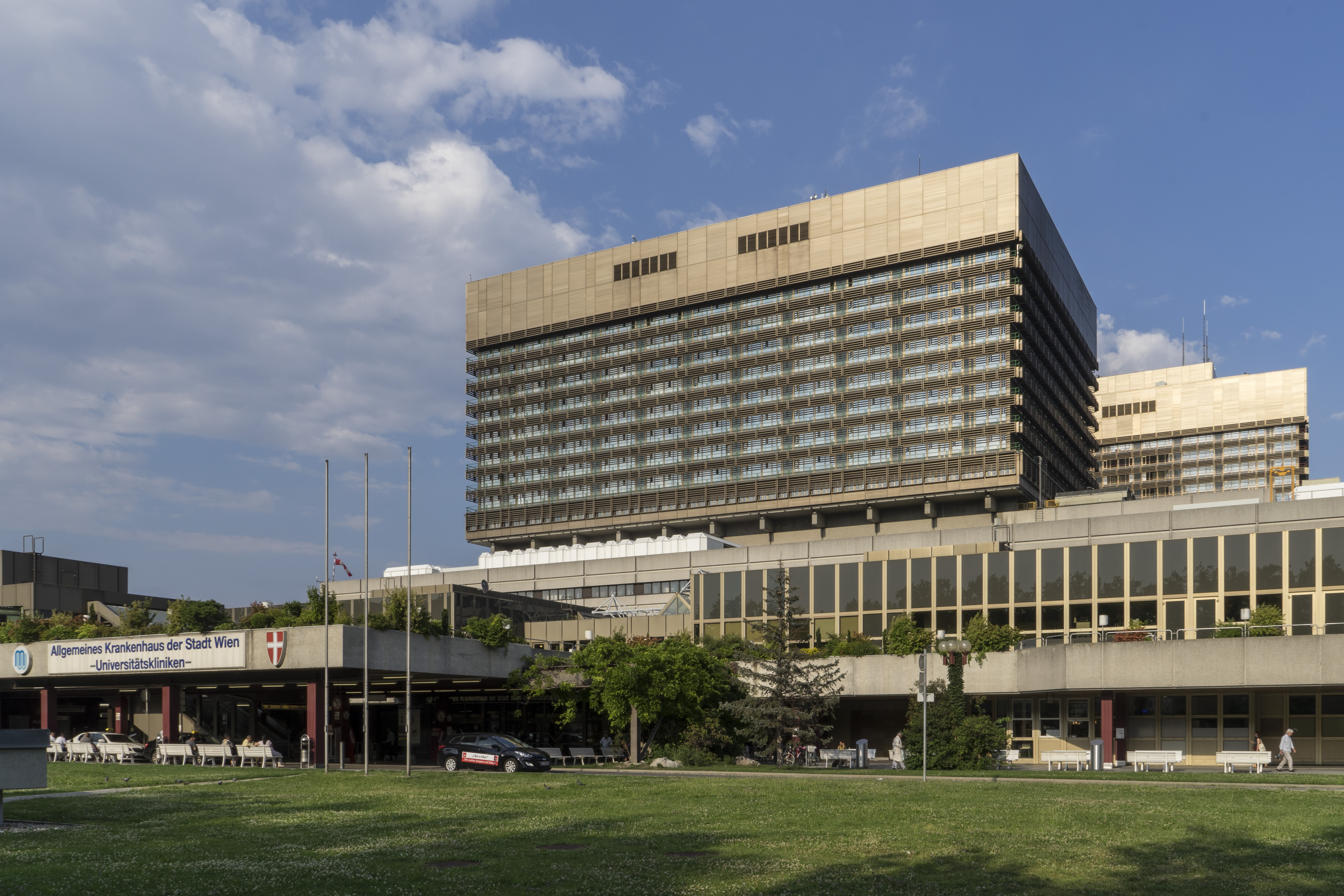
Vienna General Hospital

Healthcare in Vienna

- Gesellschaft der Ärzte in Wien
- Hospitals in Vienna
  - Steinhof
  - Vienna General Hospital
  - Wiener Privatklinik

== See also ==
- Outline of geography
