= House (surname) =

House is a surname found in English-speaking populations.

== People ==
Notable people with the surname include:

- Albert Phillip House (1890–1966), New Zealand rugby footballer
- Alex House (born 1986), Canadian actor
- Andrew House (born 1965), British businessman
- Ashley House (TV presenter) (born 1974), British television presenter
- Barry House (born 1949), Australian politician
- Brady House (born 2003), American baseball player
- Byron O. House (1902–1969), American jurist
- Carolyn House (born 1945), American swimmer
- Christopher House (born 1955), Canadian choreographer
- Colleen House (1952–2022), American politician
- Craig House (baseball) (born 1977), American baseball player
- Daina House (born 1954), American model and actress
- Dakota House (born 1974), Canadian actor
- Daniel House (born 1961), American musician
- Danielle House (born 1976), Canadian model
- Danuel House Jr. (born 1993), American basketball player
- Sir David House (1922–2012), British army officer
- Davon House (born 1989), American football player
- Eddie House (born 1978), American basketball player
- Edward M. House (1858–1938), American diplomat and politician
- Ernest R. House (born 1937), American academic
- Fred House (born 1978), American basketball player
- Frederick Maurice House (1865–1936), English-born Australian naturalist
- George House (disambiguation), multiple people
- Gerry House (born 1948), American radio personality
- Graham House (cricketer) (born 1950), Australian cricketer
- Harry House (1919–2006), Australian rules footballer
- Henry Alonzo House (1840–1930), American manufacturing engineer
- Homer Doliver House (1878–1949), American botanist
- Howard P. House (1908–2003), American otologist
- Jack House (1906–1991), British writer
- James House (singer) (born 1955), American musician
- Jeffry House (born 1946), Canadian lawyer
- Jemma House (born 1996), Australian soccer player
- Jim House (1948–2018), American politician
- J. R. House (born 1979), American baseball player
- Julian House, British musician
- Juliane House (born 1942), German linguist
- Karen Elliott House, American journalist
- Kevin House (born 1957), American football player
- Kevin House, Jr. (born 1979), American football player
- Kristian House (born 1979), English cyclist
- Matilda House (activist) (born 1945), Australian activist
- Mel House (born 1976), American film director
- Michael House, American singer and actor
- Monty House (born 1946), Australian politician
- Pat House (born 1940), American baseball player
- Paul D. House (1943 or 1944–2021), Canadian chief executive
- Paul R. House (born 1958), American Old Testament scholar and writer
- Rachael House, British contemporary artist
- Rachel House (actress) (born 1971), New Zealand actress
- Richard House, British writer
- Rick House (born 1957), Canadian football player
- Royal Earl House (1814–1895), American communications engineer
- Silas House (born 1971), American writer
- Simon House (1948–2025), English composer and musician
- Son House (1902–1988), American musician
- Stephen House (born 1957), British police officer
- Steve House (born 1970), American climber
- T. J. House (born 1989), American baseball player
- Tanner House (ice hockey) (born 1986), Canadian ice hockey player
- Ted House (born 1959), American politician and judge
- Tom House (born 1947), American baseball player
- Will House (cricketer) (born 1976), English cricketer
- William F. House (1923–2012), American otologist
- Yoanna House (born 1980), American model

== Characters ==
- Gregory House, a physician specializing in infectious disease and nephrology, the titular character in the American drama TV series House, M.D.
- Robert Edwin House, the fictional leader of Post-Apocalyptic Las Vegas featured in the roleplaying video game Fallout: New Vegas

== See also ==
- House (disambiguation)
- Haus (disambiguation)
- Hauss (surname)
