= Tourist attractions in Vienna =

UNESCO World Heritage Site
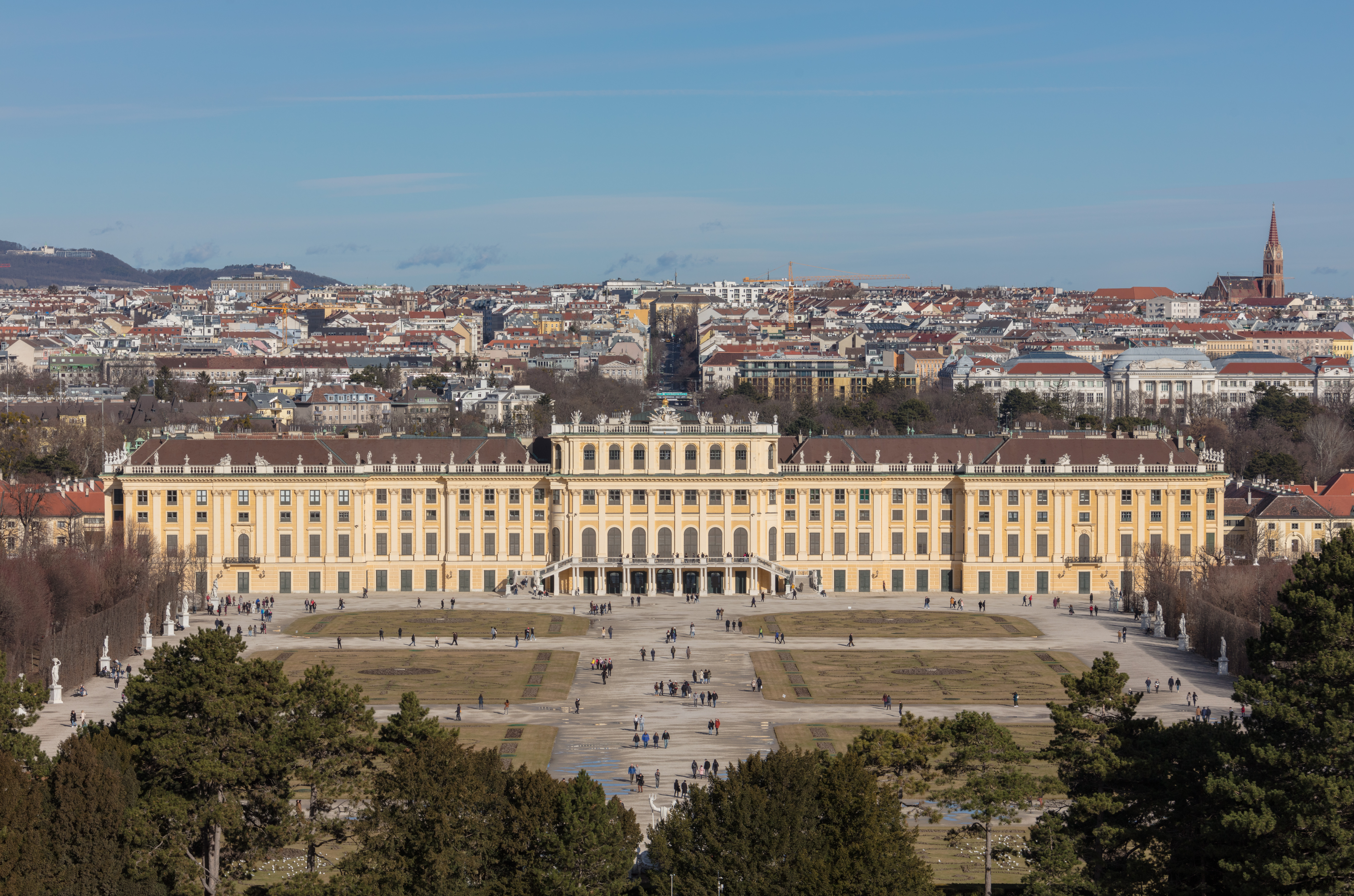
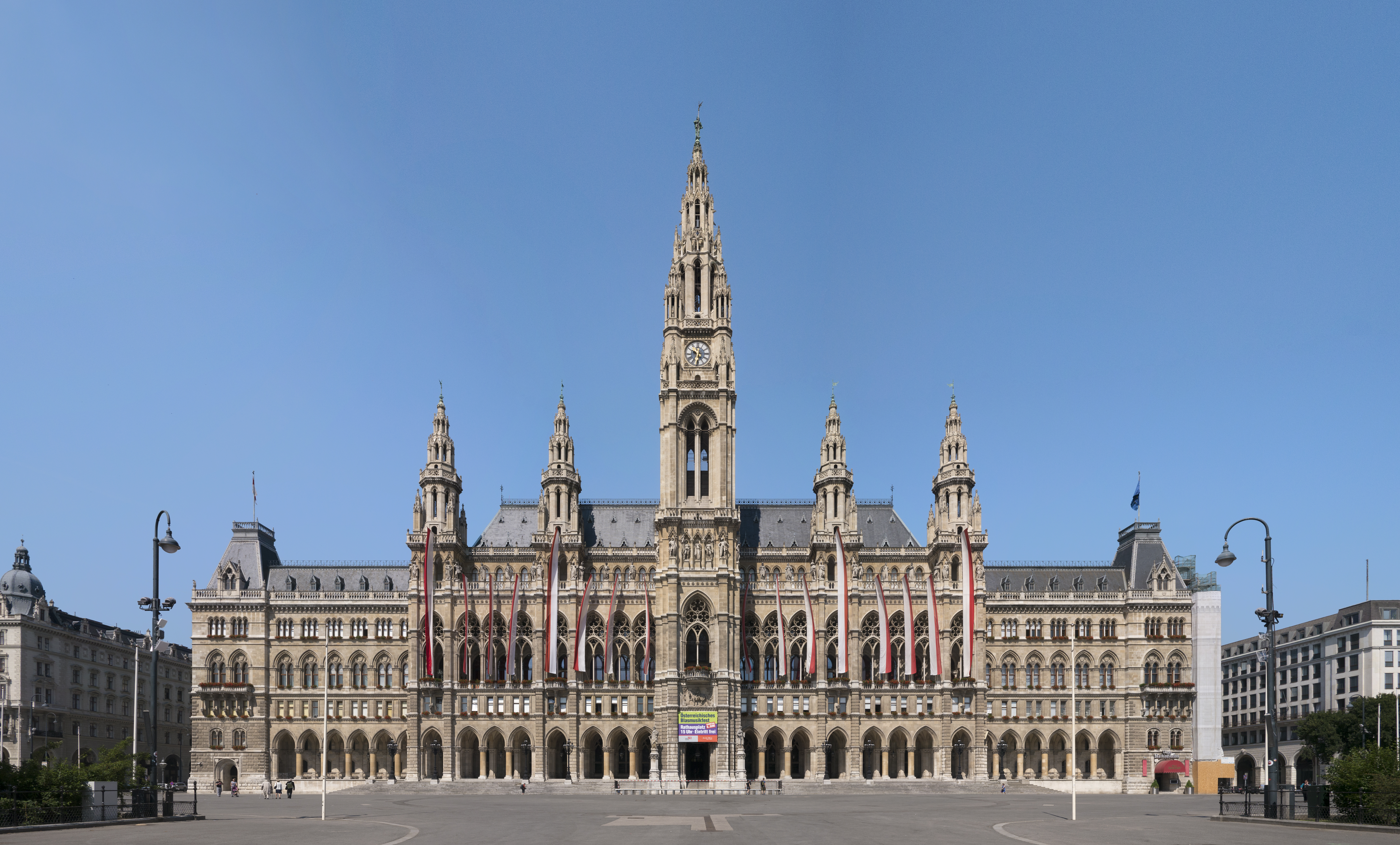
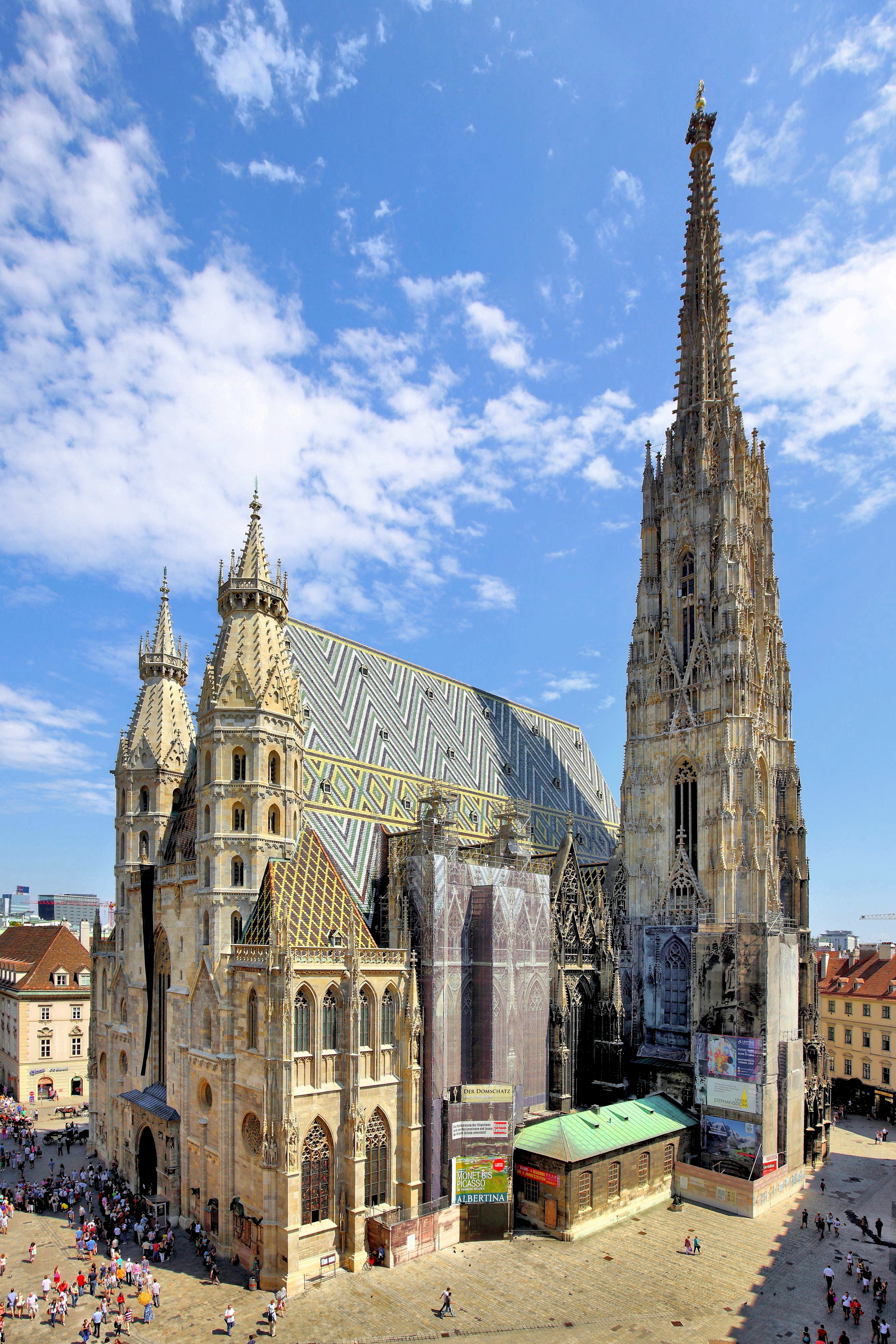
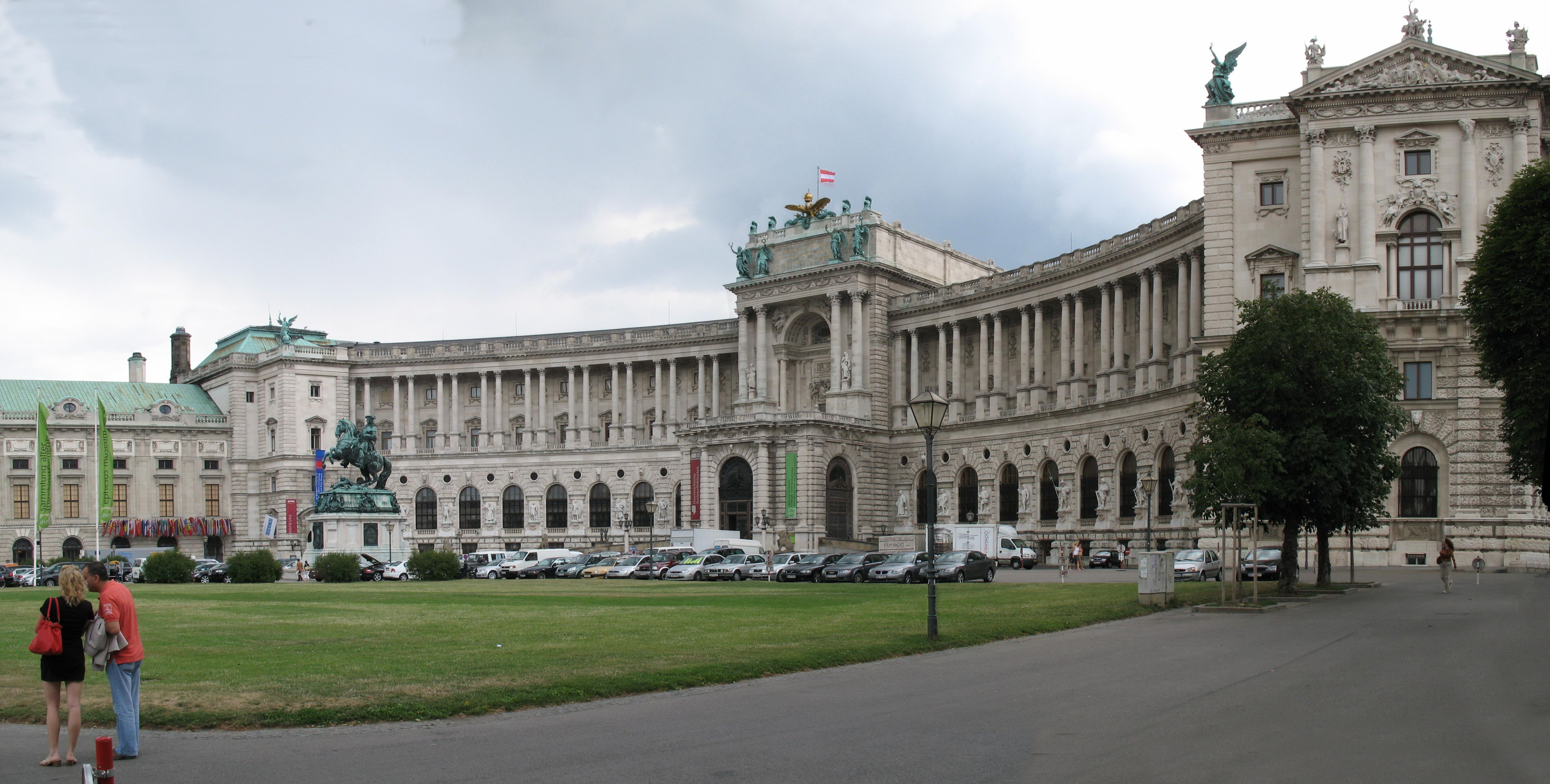

UNESCO World Heritage Site
- Official name: Historic Centre of Vienna
- Criteria: Cultural: (ii)(iv)(vi)
- Reference: 1033
- Inscription: 2001 (25th Session)
- Endangered: 2017–...
- Area: 371 ha (1.43 sq mi)
- Buffer zone: 462 ha (1.78 sq mi)

The tourist attractions of Vienna concentrate in three distinct areas. The largest cluster, centred on Schönbrunn Palace, attracted around five million visitors in 2009, down from six million in 2008. Museums and exhibitions of Hofburg Palace accounted for nearly two million visitors in 2008, with a significant decline in 2009. The third, and the newest, cluster of modern art museums in Museumsquartier attracted less than one million visitors. (Note: According to the Vienna Tourist Board, the Schönbrunn cluster includes the Palace itself, Tiergarten Schönbrunn, the Palmenhaus, the Wüstenhaus, the Imperial Coach Collection (Wagenburg), the Maze Gardens (Irrgarten) and the Privy Gardens (KronPrinzgarten). See Sehenwurdigkeiten 2007 (in German) and Sehenwurdigkeiten 2008 (in German) for exact composition of each of three clusters.) Nearby duo of Kunsthistorisches and Naturhistorisches museums, located halfway between Museumsquartier and Hofburg, also reported around one million visitors. The Landstraße district, which lies south-east of the old city, is home to art exhibitions at the Belvedere Palace and the KunstHausWien.

Vienna stands out among other European tourist destinations for being a "new old city", a city in transition from an older "picture city" like Florence and Venice to being a global city like Paris and London. For six consecutive years, 2003–2008, tourism industry was on the rise, but the 2008 financial crisis caused a sharp decline, especially in long-distance tourism from Asia and North America. The new museums of modern art retained or even increased their attendance, but museums of classical art lost more than a third of their former ticket sales. According to preliminary data for the first half of 2010, Vienna is already past the bottom of the crisis and visitor numbers are rising again. In 2013, Vienna was ranked the world's most livable city for the fifth consecutive year, playing host to 5.8 million tourists, a growth of over four percent as compared to 2012.

== Effects of the global crisis ==
In 2003–2008 the Austrian tourism industry enjoyed a six-year streak of growth, with each year beating the previous record by an average 2.1%. Tourism generated 8.4% of Austrian gross domestic product (23.6 billion Euros) and provided 181 thousand jobs. The "top ten" of Vienna's tourist attractions in this period included the Schönbrunn Palace, Tiergarten Schönbrunn, the Albertina, the Wiener Riesenrad, the Hofburg Palace museums, the Belvedere, the Kunsthistorisches and Naturhistorisches museums, the KunstHausWien and the Donauturm observation deck.

In 2008, the effects of the 2008 financial crisis on the economy were more than offset by a boost from the UEFA Euro 2008. The number of tourists reached an all-time high, although during the tournament itself museum attendance dropped by 60%, and theatres cancelled their shows altogether. The crisis hit the Austrian tourist industry in the first quarter of 2009, when international tourist arrivals dropped by 8.6%. Museum attendance suffered disproportionately higher losses. Ticket sales at Hofburg palace exhibitions dropped by 20%. Tickets sales at the Albertina, the most visited art collection in Vienna, dropped by more than a third, from 997 thousand in 2008 to 630 thousand in 2009. Its former third place in the list of Viennese attractions was taken over by the Wiener Riesenrad. The Schönbrunn Palace also recorded a drop in visitors, but its profits actually increased by a third. Tiergarten Schönbrunn reported a "record drop" of 70% in February 2009 (Note: Compared to February 2008, which was an all-time high record month. In February 2008, the Tiergarten began displaying the giant panda and polar bear cubs, which attracted unusually high numbers of local visitors. - Eintrittspreise: Was alles teurer wird (in German). Die Presse. April 6, 2009 (printed edition: April 7). Retrieved 2010-08-28.) (50% for the first quarter of 2009). Practically all museums and zoos increased ticket prices, by an average of 16.7%, the first price hike since the introduction of the Euro in 2002.

According to the Vienna Tourist Board, in 2009 the city's hotels recorded 4.385 million visitors (2008: 4.593 million). 20% of the visitors were Austrians, 24% were Germans, 5% Italians and 5% Americans. The worst losses were recorded among tourists from Asia, North America and Eastern Europe. The state responded with promoting Austria in the neighbouring countries to compensate the losses in long-distance international tourism. In the end of 2009, the trend reversed with an increase in tourists from Japan, Italy, Spain, Greece and Russia. Recovery continued in the first half of 2010. Schönbrunn Palace recorded a 5% increase in ticket sales compared to the first half of 2009, Hofburg had a twelve per cent increase.

== Ranking of tourist attractions ==
Annual rankings of tourist attractions are compiled and published by the Vienna Tourist Board (German: Wiener Tourismusverband). The underlying tickets sales statistics counts all visitors, tourists and Viennese natives, together. Freely accessible landmarks are omitted from the statistics altogether. The symbol of Vienna, St. Stephen's Cathedral, ranks only seventeenth: the number (218,000 visitors in 2009) represents sales of tickets to its underground crypts, but access to the cathedral itself is free.

The Schönbrunn Palace counts each entry by a holder of a multi-entry ticket as a separate visit. Thus, for example, in 2008 it sold 1.98 million tickets, but reported 2.581 million entries. The Palmenhaus and the Wüstenhaus, tropical landscape exhibits in the historic greenhouses of Tiergarten Schönbrunn, are counted as separate tourist attractions. The three Hofburg exhibitions (the Imperial Apartments, Sisi Museum and the Imperial Silver collection) are usually visited as a package, and each combo ticket is counted as one visit.

Rank 2009	Place	Visitors				Location
Rank 2009	Place	2006	2007	2008	2009	Location
1	Schönbrunn Palace (Note: Quoted numbers do not include tickets to the Tiergarten, Palmenhaus and Wüstenhaus which are listed as separate list entries, and the Imperial Coach Collection, which falls below top thirty. The numbers do not represent attendance to the freely accessible Schönbrunn Park and the Gloriette.); Suburban palace of the Habsburgs	2,507,000	2.590.000	2.581.000	2,467,000	48°11′5″N 16°18′44″E; Schönbrunn Palace Park, Hietzing
2	Tiergarten Schönbrunn (Note: Quoted numbers includes all visitors, including a substantial share of the natives of Vienna. The Palmenhaus and the Wüstenhaus are counted as separate tourist destinations.); World's oldest public zoo established in 1752	2,270,996	2,453,987	2,578,698	2,183,000	48°10′56″N 16°18′10″E; Schönbrunn Palace Park, Hietzing
3	Wiener Riesenrad; The Ferris wheel in Prater	620,000	620,000	660,000	640,000	48°13′00″N 16°23′45″E; Prater park, Leopoldstadt
4	Albertina; Museum of classical graphic arts	725,759	557,307	997,000	630,000	48°12′16″N 16°22′04″E; Albertinaplatz, Innere Stadt
5	Imperial Apartments, Hofburg Palace; Downtown residence of the Habsburgs	634,000	625,000	632,000	586,000	48°12′27″N 16°21′59″E; Hofburg Palace, Innere Stadt
6	Kunsthistorisches Museum; Museum of classical art	618,522	619,318	937,090	582,000	48°12′13″N 16°21′42″E; Maria-Theresienplatz, Innere Stadt
7	Upper Belvedere (former Austrian Gallery); Museum of classical and modern art. Gustav Klimt collection.	430,073 (Note: Includes both Upper and Lower Belvedere.)	594,678	807,283	448,000	48°11′29″N 16°22′52″E; Prinz-Eugen-Straße 27, Landstraße
8	Donauturm; Observation deck of the highest structure in Vienna	408,080	415,000	419,635	396,000	48°14′24″N 16°24′39″E; Donaupark, Donaustadt
9	Naturhistorisches Museum; Museum of natural history	368,801	397,140	372,778	392,000	48°12′19″N 16°21′35″E; Maria-Theresienplatz, Innere Stadt
10	Haus des Meeres; Public aquarium in a converted flak tower	247,012	258,294	336,162	353,000	48°11′51″N 16°21′11″E; Esterhazypark, Neubau
11	Leopold Museum; Museum of Austrian modern art	301,000	302,000	291,000	316,000	48°12′9″N 16°21′33″E; Museumsquartier, Mariahilf
12	Lower Belvedere; Temporary art exhibitions	(Note: Included in the number for Upper Belvedere.)			301,000	48°11′47″N 16°22′48″E; Rennweg 6, Landstraße
13	Technisches Museum Wien; Museum of technology	282,104	289,179	296,180	298,000	48°11′27″N 16°19′03″E; Mariahilfer Straße 212, Penzing (Note: Technisches Museum Wien is located within a short walking distance from the main entrance of the Schönbrunn Palace.)
14	Schatzkammer; Austrian Crown Jewels on display in the former Imperial Treasury	283,585	279,541	276,871	280,000	48°12′24″N 16°21′56″E; Hofburg Palace, Innere Stadt
15	Spanish Riding School; Classical dressage show (Note: Closed in the summer, when the horses recuperate in the open country.)	218,000	233,711	279,000	257,000	48°12′25″N 16°22′01″E; Hofburg Palace, Innere Stadt
16	Museum Moderner Kunst; Museum of international modern art	206,000	243,617	234,960	241,000	48°12′13″N 16°21′28″E; Museumsquartier, Mariahilf
17	St. Stephen's Cathedral (Note: Quoted numbers includes sales of tickets to the subterranean crypts and the belltower ascent. They do not represent actual attendance by worshippers and casual visitors.); The Mother Church of the Roman Catholic Archdiocese of Vienna	168,000	190,633	500,000	218,000	48°12′31″N 16°22′23″E; Stephansplatz, Innere Stadt
18	Imperial Crypt; Burial vault of the Habsburgs since 1633	246,600	230,000	234,531	215,000	48°12′20″N 16°22′11″E; Capuchin Church, Neuermarkt, Innere Stadt
19	Haus der Musik; Interactive museum of music and sound	200,743	199.533	203,000	205,000	48°12′14″N 16°22′24″E; Seilerstätte 30, Innere Stadt
20	Minopolis; Theme park			247,275	202,000	48°13′4″N 16°24′52″E; Donau City, Donaustadt
21	Karlskirche; Panoramic lift and observation deck (Note: Sales of tickets to the panoramic sightseeing lift inside one of the columns. The number does not represent attendance by worshippers and casual visitors.)	150,000	180,000	180,000	200,000	48°11′53″N 16°22′19″E; Karlsplatz, Wieden
22	Museum für angewandte Kunst; Museum of contemporary applied arts	196,127	175,419	176,848	178,000	48°12′27″N 16°22′54″E; Stubenring 5, Innere Stadt (Note: The MAK also manages permanent exhibitions in the flak tower in Arenbergpark and other locations.)
23	KunstHausWien; Museum of Friedensreich Hundertwasser	388,571	376,934	294,672	174,000	48°12′39″N 16°23′36″E; Untere Weißgerberstraße 13, Landstraße (Note: Former Gebrüder Thonet factory, rebuilt by Hundertwasser and Krawina.)
24	Museum of the Vienna State Opera			166,000	167,000	48°12′15″N 16°22′5″E; Hanuschgasse 3, Innere Stadt (Note: City block immediately west of the Opera building, and immediately south of the Albertina building and the Burggarten Palmenhaus.)
25	Palmenhaus Schönbrunn (Note: Another prominent Palmenhaus is located in the Burggarten of the Innere Stadt, 48°12′18″N 16°22′1″E. It shares the block of the former Augustinian Bastion with the Albertina building.); Tropical exhibit in the historic greenhouse of the Tiergarten	156,146	160,141	171,164	160,000	48°11′3″N 16°18′11″E; Schönbrunn Palace Park, Hietzing
26	The Prunksaal of the Austrian National Library; The historical Grand Hall of the Court Library	155,316	156.265	169,427	159,000	48°12′22″N 16°22′0″E; Hofburg Palace, Innere Stadt
27	Austrian Parliament Building; Guided tours through the parliament building			123,440	149,000	48°12′29″N 16°21′29″E; Dr.-Karl-Renner-Ring 3, Innere Stadt
28	Mozarthaus; Mozart's residence from 1784 to 1787	203,098	135,815	133,263	141,000	48°12′29″N 16°22′32″E; Domgasse 5, Innere Stadt
29	Heeresgeschichtliches Museum; Military history museum			126,000	140,000	48°11′07″N 16°23′15″E; Former Arsenal buildings, Landstraße
30	Wüstenhaus Schönbrunn; Desert exhibit in the historic greenhouse of the Tiergarten				135,000	48°11′5″N 16°18′6″E; Schönbrunn Palace Park, Hietzing

== See also ==
Museums in Vienna not included in the 2009 top thirty ranking:

- Architekturzentrum Wien
- Museum of Art Fakes
- Austrian Theatre Museum (Note: Partnered with the State Opera Museum, which is included in the ranking, through a joint ticketing program.)
- Ephesos Museum in Hofburg
- Museum of Ethnology in Hofburg
- Judenplatz Holocaust Memorial
- Kunsthalle Wien
- Bestattungsmuseum Wien
- Vienna Künstlerhaus
- Liechtenstein Museum
- Jewish Museum Vienna
- Museum of the Vienna Secession
- Sigmund Freud Museum
- Vienna Museum (group)

== Other attractions ==
- Bohemian Prater a historical but still functioning amusement park.
- UNO-City Guided tours of the United Nations Office at Vienna, one of the four global UN headquarters.
- Vienna Gasometers repurposed as housing from their original function as gas storage for the city.

== Sources ==
- Mazanec, Josef; Wober, Karl (2009). Analysing International City Tourism. Springer. ISBN 3-211-09415-6.
- OECD (2010). OECD Tourism Trends and Policies 2010. OECD Publishing. ISBN 92-64-07741-3.
