= House (disambiguation) =

A house is a structure used for habitation by people.

House(s) may also refer to:

== Arts, entertainment, and media ==
=== Film ===
- House (1977 film), a Japanese horror film
- House (film series), an American horror/comedy film series
  - House (1985 film), the first film in the series directed by Steve Miner
- House (1995 film), a Canadian film directed by Laurie Lynd
- House!, a 2000 British comedy film
- House (2008 film), a horror film based on the novel by Frank E. Peretti and Ted Dekker
- Houses (film), a 2025 Israeli film
- Thomas "House" Conklin, a character in Police Academy comedy films

=== Television ===
- House (TV series), an American television medical drama
  - Gregory House, main character of said drama
- House, a villain in the Doctor Who episode "The Doctor's Wife"

=== Literature ===
- House (novel), a 2006 Christian fiction horror novel by Frank Peretti and Ted Dekker
- House, a 1985 documentary book by Tracy Kidder
- House, one of two plays that constitute House & Garden (plays), 1999, by Alan Ayckbourn

=== Music and dance ===
==== Generic terms ====
- House band, a venue's in-house group
- House music, a style of electronic dance music
  - House dance, a related form of street dance

==== Bands ====
- A House, from Dublin
- The House Band, from Edinburgh

==== Songs ====
- "House" (Patrick Wolf song), 2011
- "House" (The Psychedelic Furs song), 1989
- "House" (Charli XCX song), 2025
- "Houses", by Judy Collins on So Early in the Spring
- "Houses", by Dinosaur Jr. on Farm
- "Houses", by the Fire Theft on The Fire Theft
- "Houses", by Maisie Peters on Florescence
- "Houses", by Søren on Stargazing
- "The House Song", by Peter, Paul and Mary on Album 1700

=== Other media ===
- House (sculpture), a Turner-Prize-winning sculpture by Rachel Whiteread
- House (ball culture)
- Auditorium, or house in theatrical jargon
- Robert House, a character from the 2010 action role-playing game Fallout: New Vegas

== People ==
- House (line of rulers), a noble or royal family, also known as dynasty, family, clan
- House (surname), includes a list of people with the name

== Business ==
- Fashion house (maison couture), a business, often family-owned, which specializes in fashion design, including haute couture
- House brand, a private label brand made by the company that sells it in its own stores
- House Foods, a Japanese food manufacturer and brand
- House (brand), a clothing brand

== Education ==
- House system, a traditional feature of schools in the Commonwealth
- House, the name for various Harvard University residences

== Places ==
=== United States ===
- House, New Mexico, a village
- House, North Carolina, an unincorporated community

== Religion and mythology ==
- House (astrology)
- Religious house or monastery

== Other uses ==
- House (curling), the target in the sport of curling
- House (game), a children's role-playing game
- House (legislature), several law-making bodies
- House (steamboat), the cabin structure on a steamboat
- Broadway house, chiefly American English, describing entertainment venues in the Theater District, Manhattan

== See also ==
- The House (disambiguation)
- Haus (disambiguation)
- Household
- Houses of Parliament (disambiguation)
