= Desert House =

Desert House may refer to:

- Kaufmann Desert House, Palm Springs, California, United States
- Wüstenhaus Schönbrunn, Vienna, Austria
- Desart Court, historic houses near Cuffesgrange and Callan, County Kilkenny, Ireland.
