= The House =

The House may refer to:

== In arts and entertainment ==
=== In film and television ===
- The House (1975 film), a Yugoslav film
- The House (1983 film), an Icelandic film
- The House (1997 film), a Lithuanian film
- The House (1999 film), a Chinese film directed by Wang Xiaoshuai
- The House (2011 film), a Slovak/Czech drama film directed by Zuzana Liová
- The House (2013 film), a Chinese film directed by Yuan Li
- The House (2017 film), an American comedy film directed by Andrew J. Cohen
- House of Lust, a 2022 French-Belgian film also known as The House
- The House (TV series), a 1996 BBC series about the Royal Opera House, London
- The House (TV special), a 2022 three-part stop-motion anthology
- "The House" (Not Going Out), a 2013 television episode
- The House, a 2017 Australian TV series by Annabel Crabb

=== In print ===
- The House, a 1920 novel by Katharine Tynan
- The House, a 1926 novel by Richmal Crompton
- The House, a 1944 book by Marjorie Hill Allee
- The House, a 1997 novel by Bentley Little
- The House (novel), a 2006 novel by Danielle Steel
- The House (magazine), a magazine relating to the House of Commons of the United Kingdom
- The House, a 2009 children's book written by J. Patrick Lewis and illustrated by Roberto Innocenti

=== Other uses in arts and entertainment ===
- The House (Katie Melua album), 2010
- The House (Porches album), 2018
- The House (radio program), a political radio programme in Canada
- The House, a palace-city surrounded by the Garden in the fantasy series The Claidi Journals
- The House (The Keys to the Kingdom), the primary setting of a Garth Nix fantasy series

== Other uses ==
- The House (trees), a group of monumental Giant Sequoias in Sequoia National Park, California
- House (legislature), in various countries
- The House (restaurant), Michelin starred restaurant in Ireland
- A casino, in the context of a gamble for which it sets the terms
- Christ Church, Oxford, a college nicknamed "the House"
- Random House, a publishing company nicknamed "the House"

== See also ==
- House (disambiguation)
