= Hauss =

Hauss is a surname. Notable people with the surname include:

- Alberto Hauss (1954–2025), German composer and producer
- David Hauss (born 1984), French triathlete
- Len Hauss (1942–2021), American football center
- Marcel Hauss (1890–1917), World War I flying ace
- René Hauss (1927–2010), former French footballer and coach

Given name

- Hauss Hejny (born 2005), American football player

== See also ==
- Haus § People
