= Vienna Gasometers =

Gas storage complex in Vienna

Coordinates: 48.185°N 16.420°E

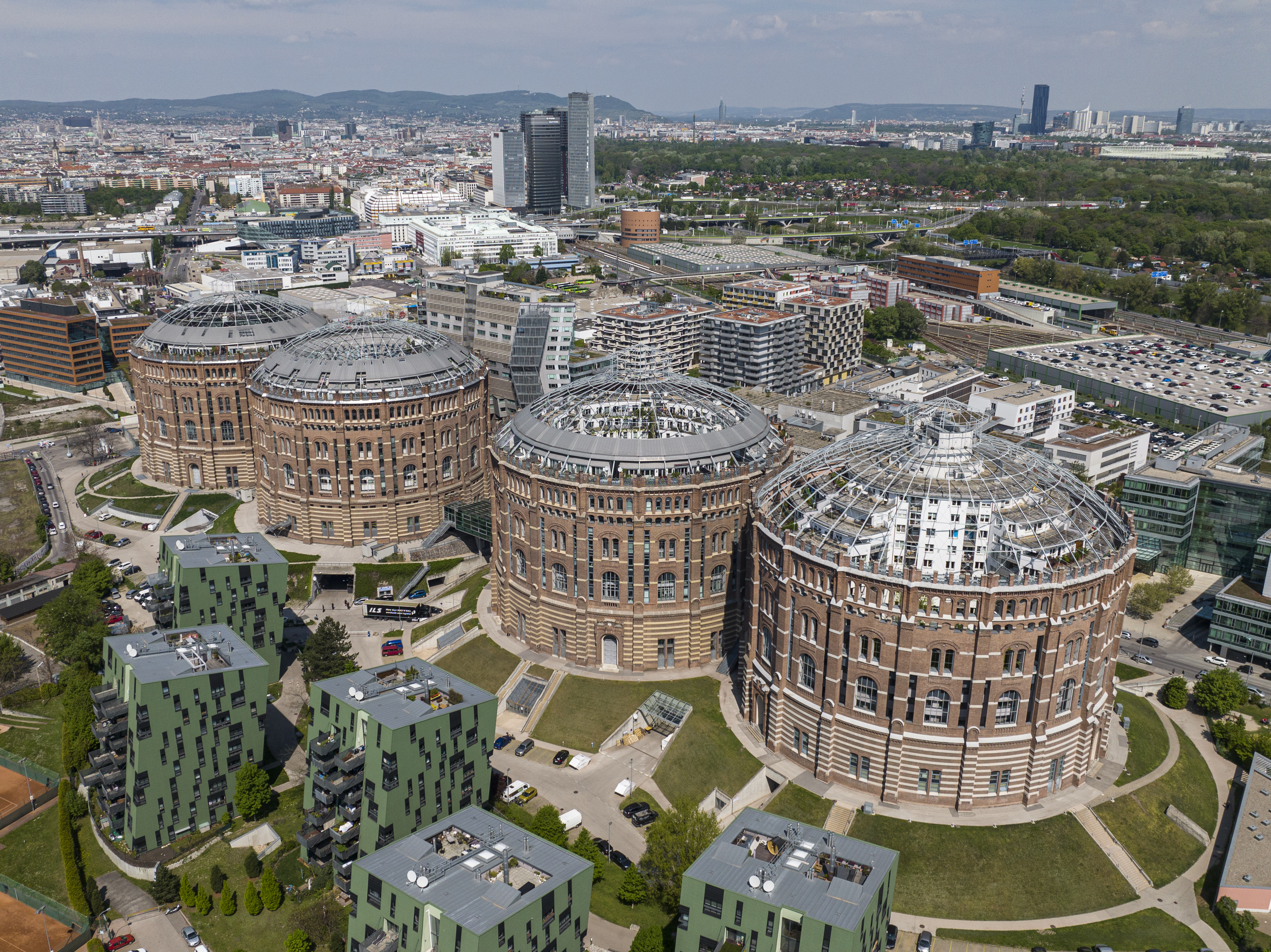
Birdview of gasometer Vienna

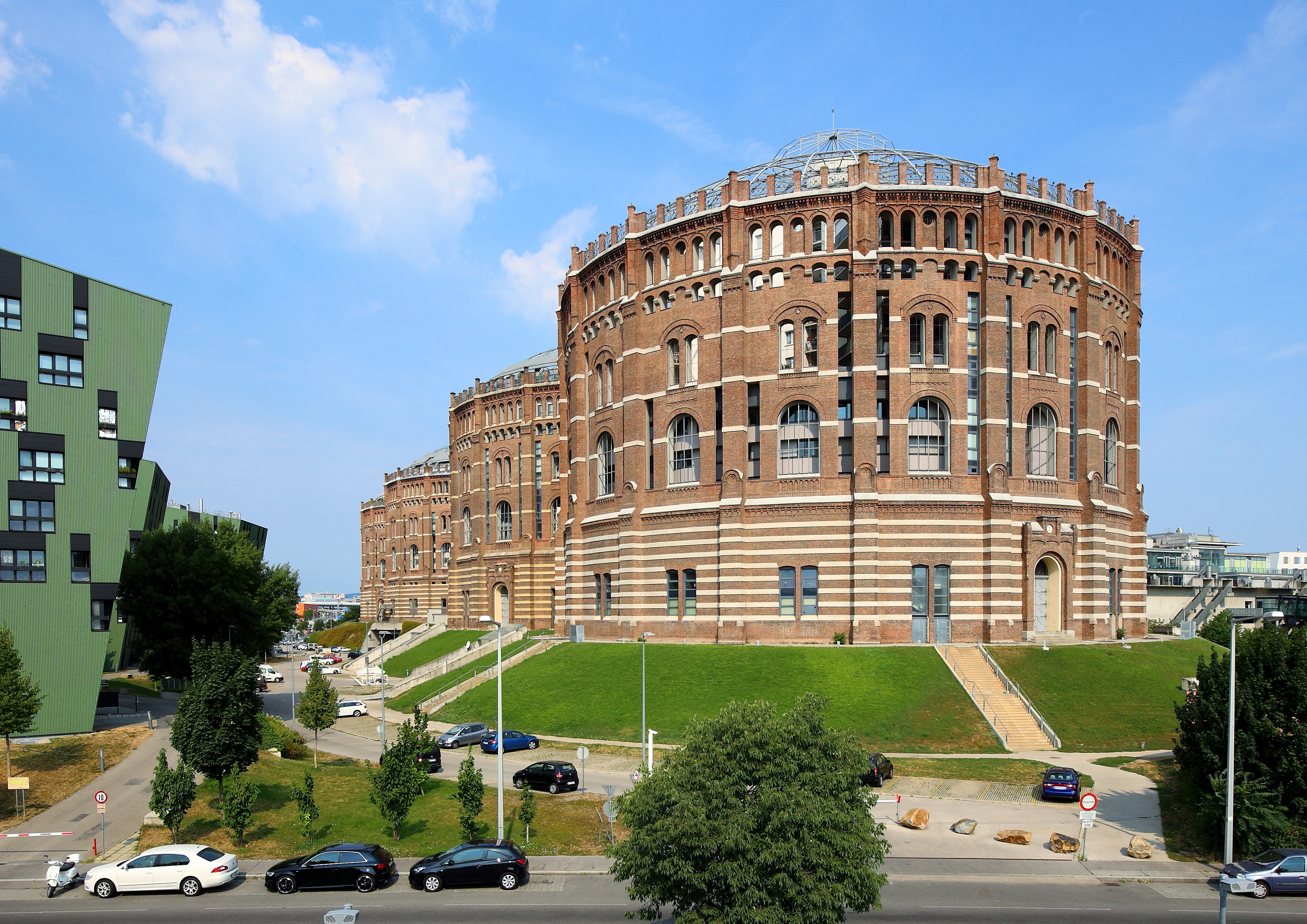
Gasometer Vienna

The Vienna Gasometers are four gasholder houses, built as part of the municipal gas works in Vienna, Austria. The original gasholder houses were constructed from 1896 to 1899. They are located in the 11th district, Simmering. They were used from 1899 to 1984 to house gas holders (also known as gasometers), each with a storage capacity of 90,000 cubic meters (3 million cu. ft.).

After the transition from coal gas to natural gas between 1969 and 1978, the four gasholder houses were no longer used and were shut down. Only the brick exterior walls were preserved. The structures have found new residential and commercial use in modern times, and are now a tourist attraction.

== History ==
The Gasometers were built from 1896 to 1899 in the Simmering district of Vienna near the Gaswerk Simmering gas works of the district. The containers were used to help supply Vienna with town gas, facilities which had previously been provided by the English firm Inter Continental Gas Association (ICGA). Once the contracts with the ICGA expired, the city decided to construct facilities to handle its own gas needs. The Gasometers were retired in 1985 because Vienna transitioned from town gas and coal gas to natural gas.

The Vienna Gasometer was featured in the 1987 James Bond film The Living Daylights.

=== Residential redevelopment ===
Vienna undertook a remodelling and revitalization of the protected monuments and in 1995 called for ideas for the new use of the structures. The chosen designs by the architects Jean Nouvel (Gasometer A), Coop Himmelblau (Gasometer B), Manfred Wehdorn (Gasometer C) and Wilhelm Holzbauer (Gasometer D) were completed between 1999 and 2001. Each gasometer was divided into several zones for living (apartments in the top), working (offices in the middle floors) and entertainment and shopping (shopping malls in the ground floors). The shopping mall levels in each gasometer are connected to the others by skybridges. The historic exterior wall was conserved. One of the ideas rejected for the project was the plan by architect Manfred Wehdorn to use the Gasometers for hotels and facilities for the planned World Expo in Vienna and Budapest.

On 30 October 2001 the mayor of Vienna attended the official grand opening of the Gasometers, although people had begun moving in as early as May 2001.

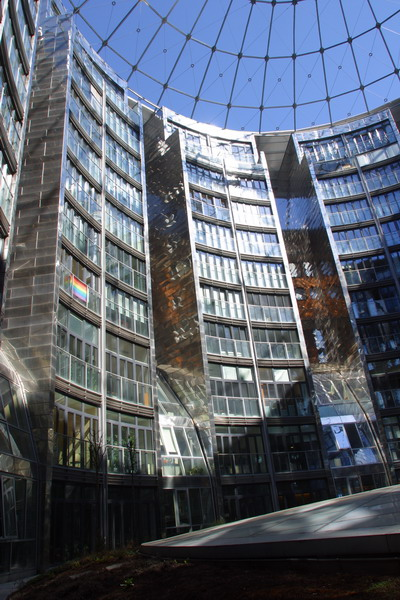
Gasometer A, inside

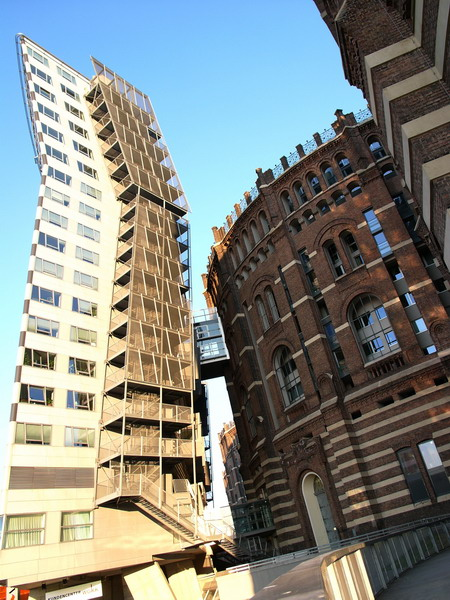
Gasometer B, outside

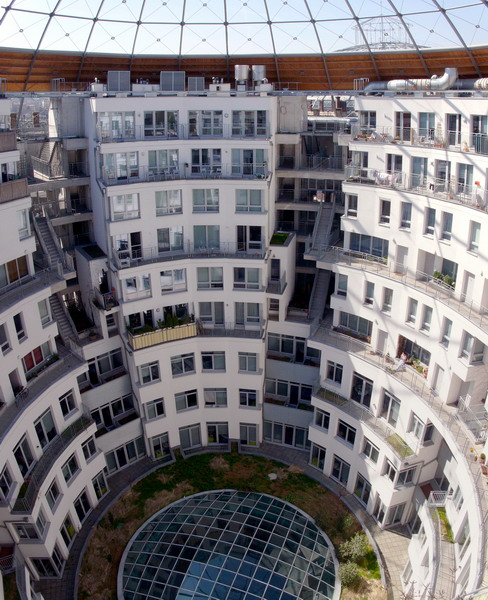
Gasometer C, inside

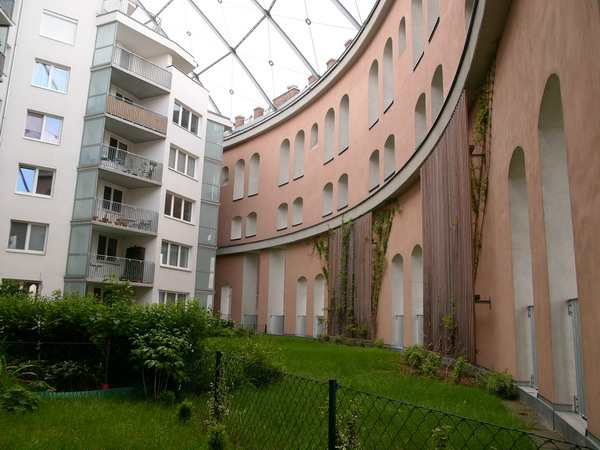
Gasometer D, inside

== Technical details ==
Raiffeisen Halle
- Halle Gasometer
- Full name: Planet.tt Raiffeisen Halle
- Former names: BA-CA Halle (2001-03); Bank Austria Halle (2003-24)
- Address: Guglgasse 8 A-1110 Vienna, Austria
- Owner: Stadt Wien
- Operator: Planet Music & Media GmbH
- Capacity: 4,200

Construction
- Groundbreaking: 5 February 1999
- Opened: 31 August 2001
- Renovated: 2005

Website
- Venue Website

The four Gasometers structures each held a cylindrical telescopic gas holder, each with a volume of about 90,000 m^{3} (3 million cu. ft.) seated in a water basin, each enclosed by a red-brick facade. They are each 70 metres (230 ft) tall and 60 metres (200 ft) in diameter. The Gasometers were gutted during the remodelling and only the brick exterior and parts of the roof were left standing.

Coal gas was dry-distilled from coal and was stored in these containers before it was distributed into the city gas network. The "town gas" was originally used only by the street lamps, but in 1910, its use for cooking and heating in private homes was introduced.

== Indoor facilities ==
Indoor facilities include a music hall, a movie theatre, a student dormitory, and a municipal archive. There are about 800 apartments, two thirds within the historic brick walls, with 1600 regular tenants, as well as about 70 student apartments.
