= Closet Space =

- Closet Space poster artwork
- Directed by: Mel House
- Written by: Jason Stewart
- Produced by: Mel House; Chelsea Viles; Carlyn Burton; Bree Perrin
- Starring: Melanie Donihoo; Jovan Jackson; James LaMarr; Morgan McCarthy; Evan Scott; Peyton Wetzel; Tim Wrobel
- Cinematography: William Leonardo Molina
- Edited by: Mel House
- Release date: December 2008
- Country: United States
- Language: English

Closet Space is a 2008 horror film directed by Mel House. It stars Melanie Donihoo, Jovan Jackson, James LaMarr, Morgan McCarthy and Tim Wrobel. It was filmed in and around Houston, Texas.

== Plot ==
Inspired by the writings of H. P. Lovecraft, the film follows a group of university students who are seeking their lost professor. They soon learn that he has discovered an alternate universe, accessible through a closet in an old farmhouse, and they decide to rescue him. Little do they know, horrible creatures live in the darkness of his alternate reality - ready to consume anything that enters their world.

== Cast ==
- Melanie Donihoo as Nancy
- Jovan Jackson as Dallas
- James LaMarr as Jack
- Morgan McCarthy as Kristen
- Evan Scott as Laurie
- Peyton Wetzel as Glen
- Tim Wrobel as Professor Polanco
- Danielle Jones as Monica
- Richard Boatto as Sobajima

== Reception ==
Geek of Doom was mixed in their review. Dread Central rated Closet Space at 3 1/2, writing that the film "has issues that almost all first-time low budget features do, but the subject matter, intellect of the characters and solid pacing place it a step above the rest of the indie schlock that’s out there."
