= George House =

George House may refer to:

== People ==
- George House (British politician) (1892–1949), Labour Member of Parliament for St Pancras North 1945–1949
- George House (California politician) (1929–2016), Republican member of the California State Assembly

== Places in the United States ==
- George Farmhouse, Smyrna, Delaware, listed on the National Register of Historic Places (NRHP) in Kent County
- Strong-Davis-Rice-George House, Eatonton, Georgia, listed on the NRHP in Putnam County
- Stovall-George-Woodward House, Vienna, Georgia, listed on the NRHP in Dooly County
- G. J. George House, Fairfield, Illinois, listed on the NRHP in Wayne County
- George-Vest House, Verona, Kentucky, listed on the NRHP in Boone County
- George House (Chaumont, New York), listed on the NRHP in Jefferson County
- Lee & Helen George House, Hickory, North Carolina, listed on the NRHP in Catawba County
- Charles Noden George House, Topton, North Carolina, listed on the NRHP in Graham County
- Henry George Birthplace, Philadelphia, Pennsylvania, listed on the NRHP in Center City, Philadelphia
- Samuel George House, Louisville, Tennessee, listed on the NRHP in Blount County
- Murray-George House, Beloit, Wisconsin, listed on the NRHP in Rock County
- Warren B. George House, Wauwatosa, Wisconsin, listed on the NRHP in Milwaukee County
