= Haus =

Haus is a Germanic word meaning house. It may refer to:

== People ==
- Anton Haus (1851–1917), Austrian grand admiral, fleet commander of the Austro-Hungarian Navy in World War I
- Georg Haus (1895–1945), German general
- Hermann A. Haus (1925–2003), Slovene-American physicist, electrical engineer and Institute Professor at the Massachusetts Institute of Technology
- Jacques-Joseph Haus (1796–1881), Belgian lawyer and professor
- Julie Haus (b. 1973), American fashion designer
- Knut Haus (1915–2006), Norwegian politician
- Samuel Haus (born 1990), Swedish actor

== Places ==
- Haus Municipality, a former municipality in the old Hordaland county, Norway
- Haus, Osterøy, a village in Osterøy municipality in Vestland county, Norway
- Haus Church, a parish church in Osterøy municipality in Vestland county, Norway
- Haus im Ennstal, a city in Styria, Austria

== Buildings ==
- Haus am Horn, historic home in Weimar, Germany
- Haus Auensee, concert hall in Leipzig, Germany
- Haus Bamenohl, castle in North Rhine-Westphalia, Germany
- Haus Carstanjen, castle on the River Rhine, Germany
- Haus Cumberland, Grade II listed building in Charlottenburg, Berlin
- Haus des Lehrers, congress center in Berlin
- Haus des Meeres, public aquarium in Vienna, Austria
- Haus des Rundfunks, historic broadcasting center in Berlin
- Haus Tambaran, a type of ancestral worship space in Papua New Guinea
- Haus Vaterland, former pleasure palace in Berlin, Germany
- Haus Wittgenstein, historic home in Vienna, Austria

== Businesses and Organizations ==
- Haus Alkire, American fashion label
- Haus Altenberg, educational institution in Altenberg, Germany
- Haus der Geschichte, national museum of contemporary history, Berlin
- Haus der Kulturen der Welt, international center for contemporary arts, Berlin
- Haus der Kunst, art museum in Munich, Germany
- Haus der Musik, national museum of sound and music, Vienna, Austria
- Haus Konstruktiv, an arts foundation in Zürich, Switzerland
- Haus Laboratories, a cosmetics brand launched by Lady Gaga
- Haus Publishing, London-based publishing company

== Music ==
- "Haus am See", song released in 2008 by German musician Peter Fox
- Haus der Lüge, 1989 album by the German band Einstürzende Neubauten
- "Haus of Holbein", song from pop musical Six (musical)
- Haus Party, Pt. 1, 2019 album by Todrick Hall
- Haus Party, Pt. 2, 2019 album by Todrick Hall

== Science ==
- The category of Hausdorff space with continuous maps, in mathematics
- HAUS1, a human gene
- HAUS3, a human gene
- HAUS6, a human gene
