= Palmenhaus Schönbrunn =

Greenhouse in Vienna, Austria

Coordinates: 48°11′05″N 16°18′10″E

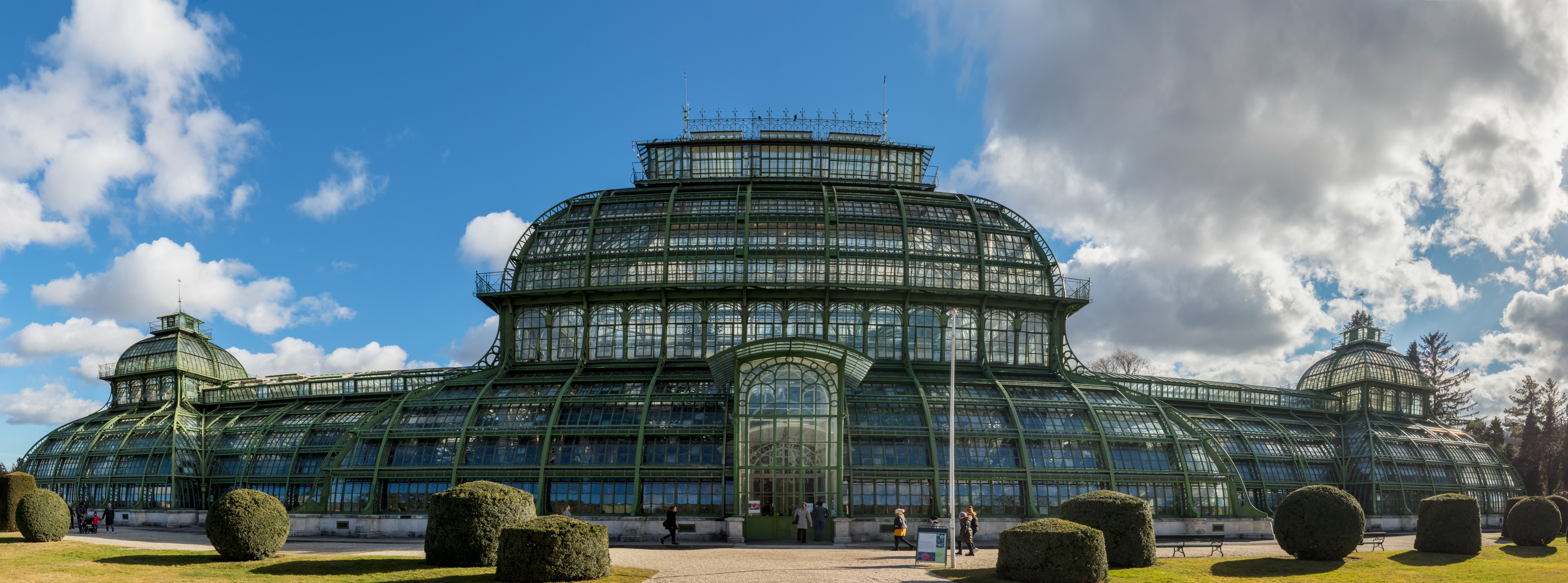
The Palmenhaus Schönbrunn

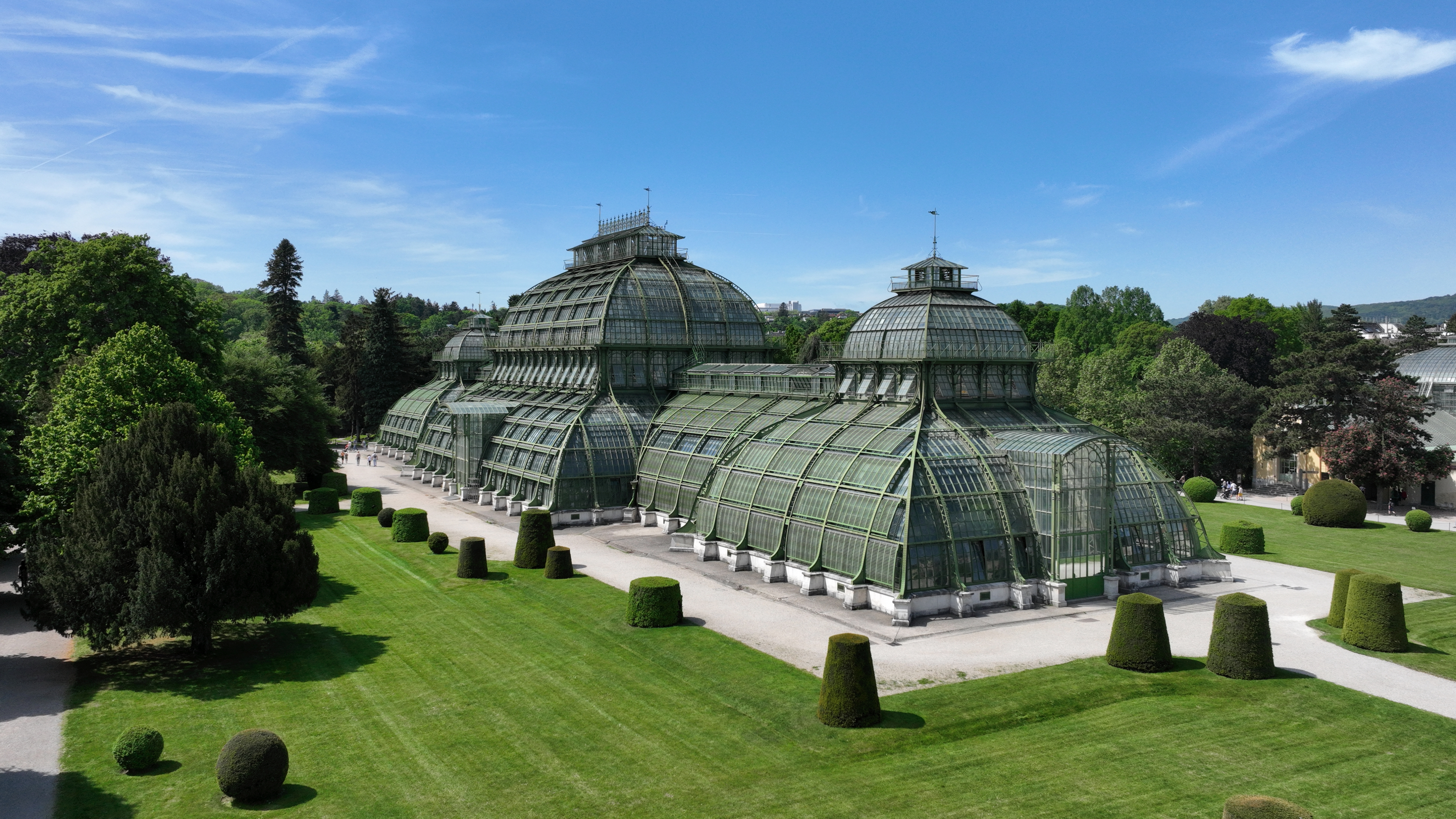
Aerial view of the Palm House in the park at Schönbrunn Palace

The Palmenhaus Schönbrunn is a large greenhouse in Vienna, Austria featuring plants from around the world. It opened in 1882. It is the most prominent of the four greenhouses in Schönbrunn Palace Park, and is also among the largest botanical exhibits of its kind in the world, with around 4,500 plant species.

== History ==
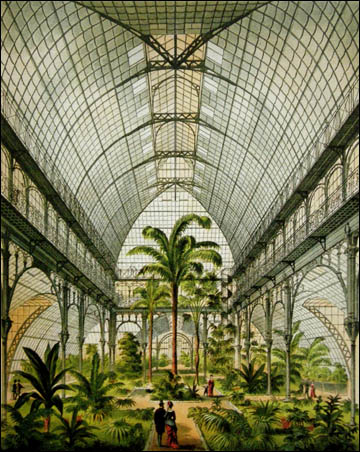
A drawing of the Palmenhaus in 1883.

Several forerunners were built in the Palace Park in the 18th and 19th centuries, under Emperors Francis I and Joseph II. The present building was built by Ignaz Gridl following plans by court architect Franz-Xaver von Segenschmid, known for his projects of bridges, and Sigmund Wagner. Groundbreaking took place in 1881 and Franz Joseph I opened the greenhouse on 19 June 1882. Since 1918 it has been run by the Bundesgärten (Federal Gardens). A heavy bomb attack on Schönbrunn Palace in February 1945 destroyed most of the glazing of the Palmenhaus. Many plants died, although some were saved by being transferred to the nearby Sonnenuhrhaus. The rebuilding began in 1948, and the Palmenhaus was reopened in 1953.

The building was closed to the public in 1976 as a safety measure following the collapse of the Reichsbrücke. Renovations were carried out between 1986 and 1990.

== Architecture ==
Built with 600 tons of wrought iron and 120 tons of cast iron, the Palmenhaus is 111 metres long, 28 metres wide and 25 metres high, and has 45,000 glass tiles. The annexes on the north and south sides serve as a coldhouse and a hothouse respectively.

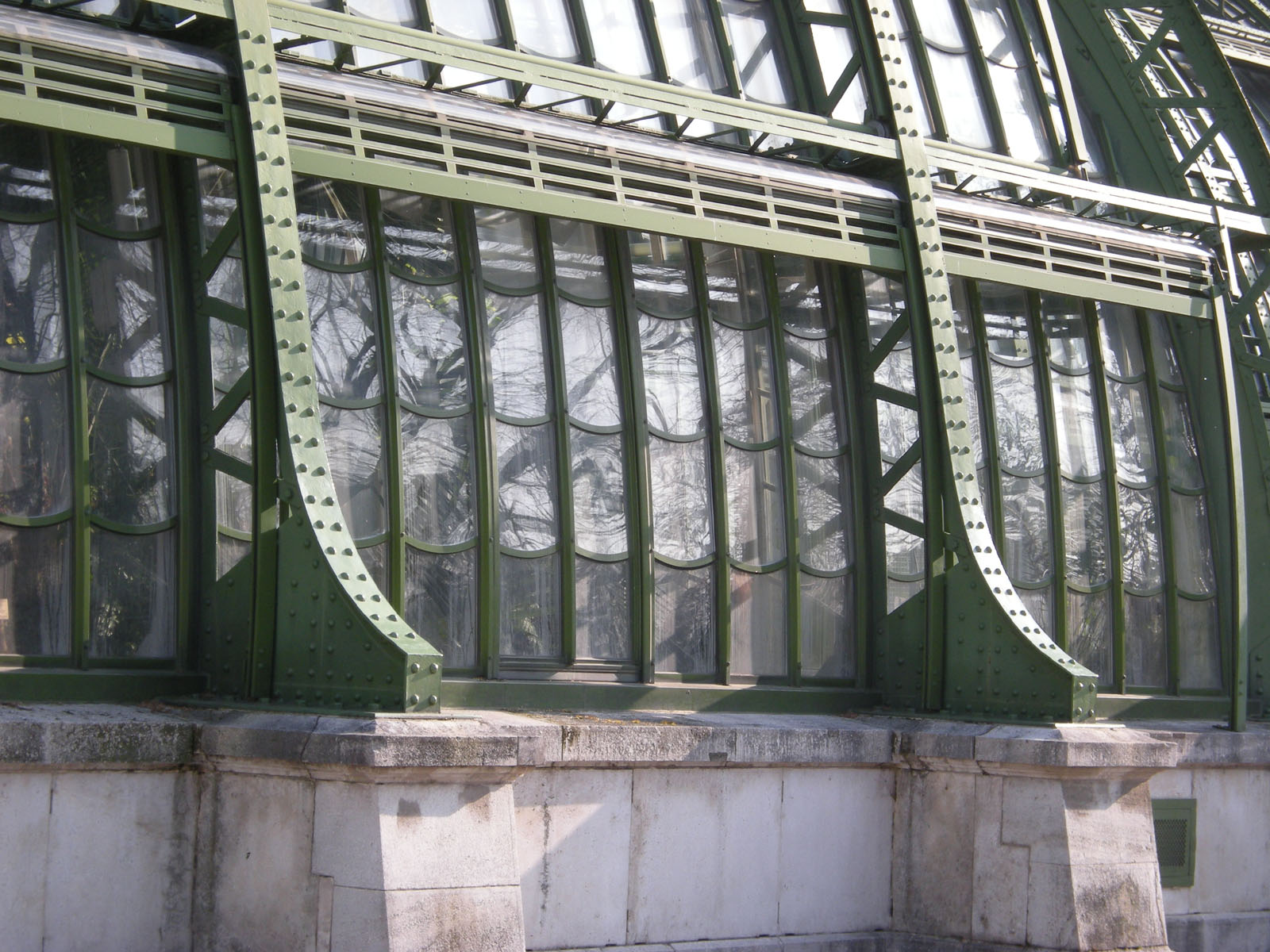
Detail of the structure.

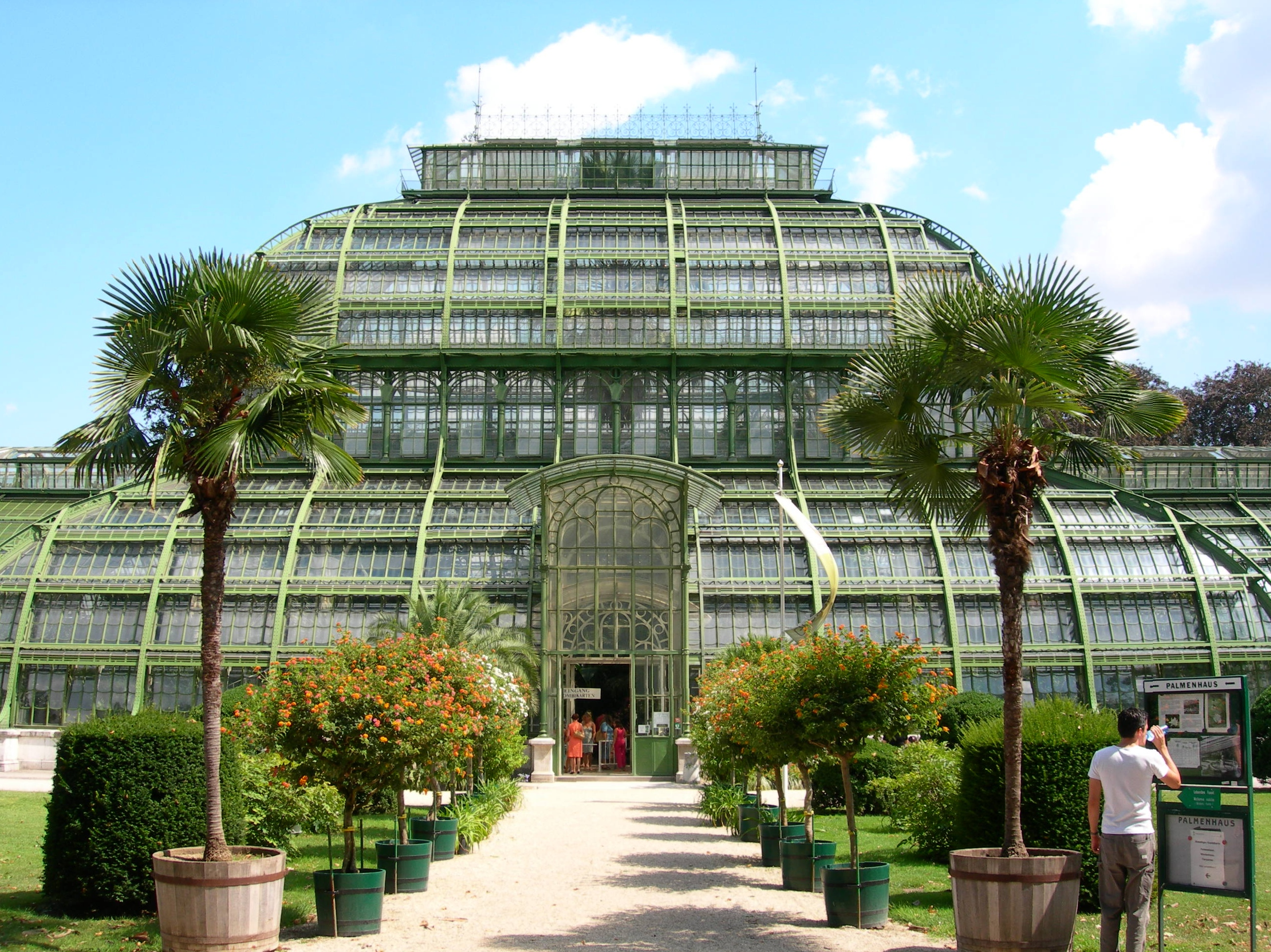
Central Hall entrance.

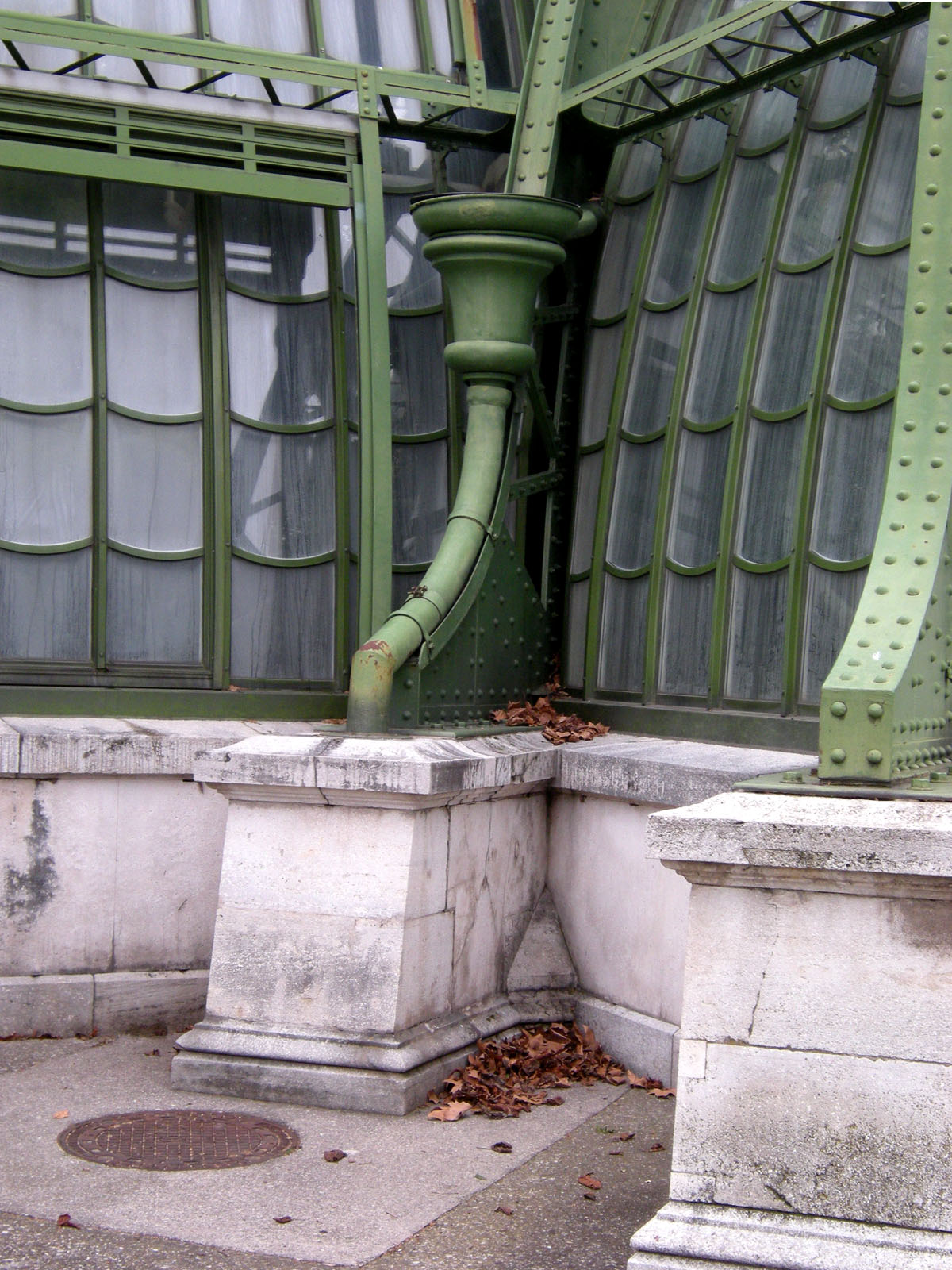
Detail of water conduit.

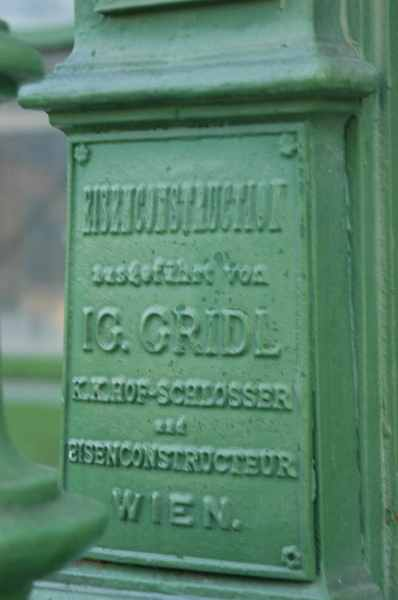
Detail of the metal structure showing Gridl's name.

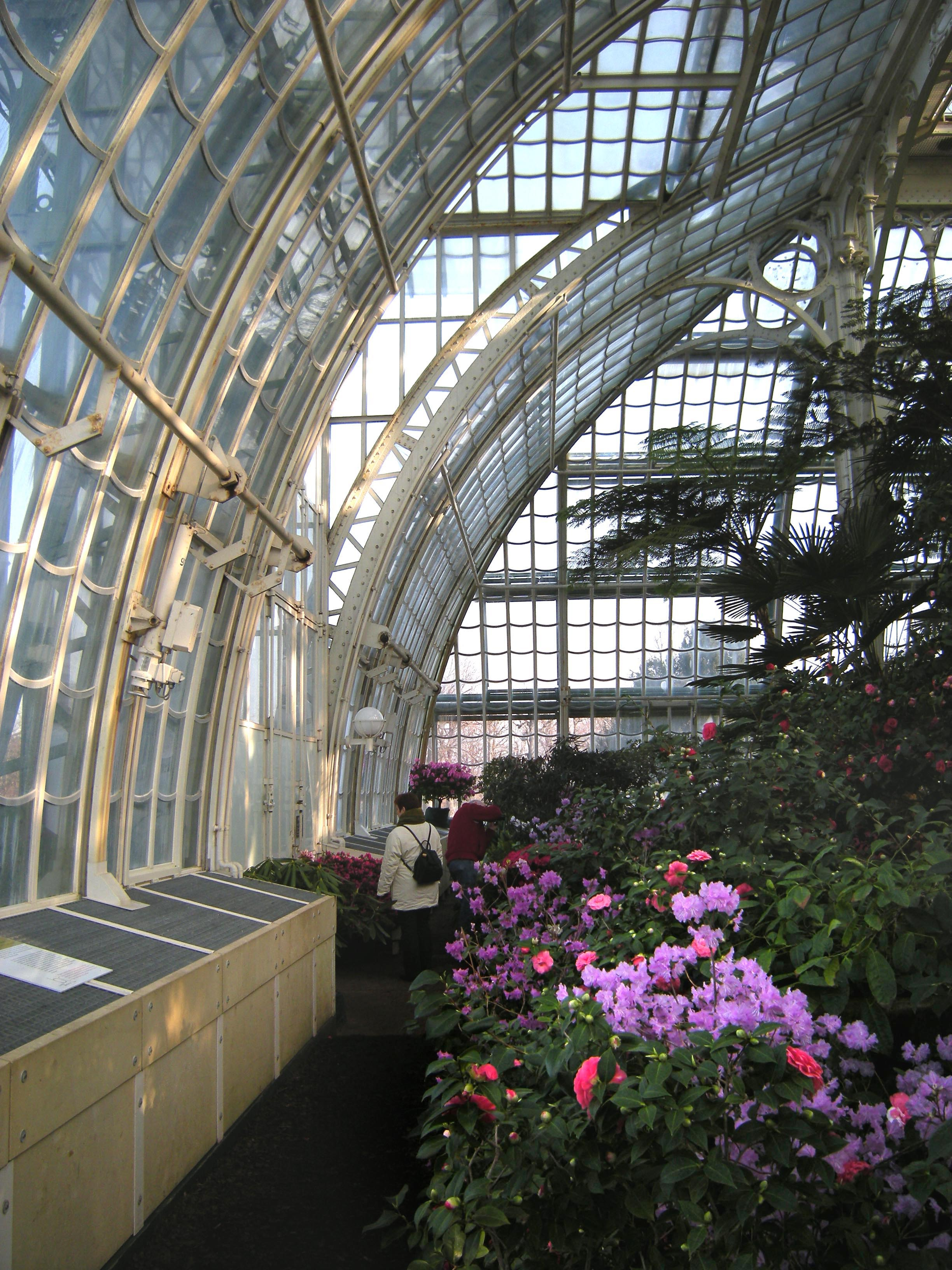
The structure from the interior.

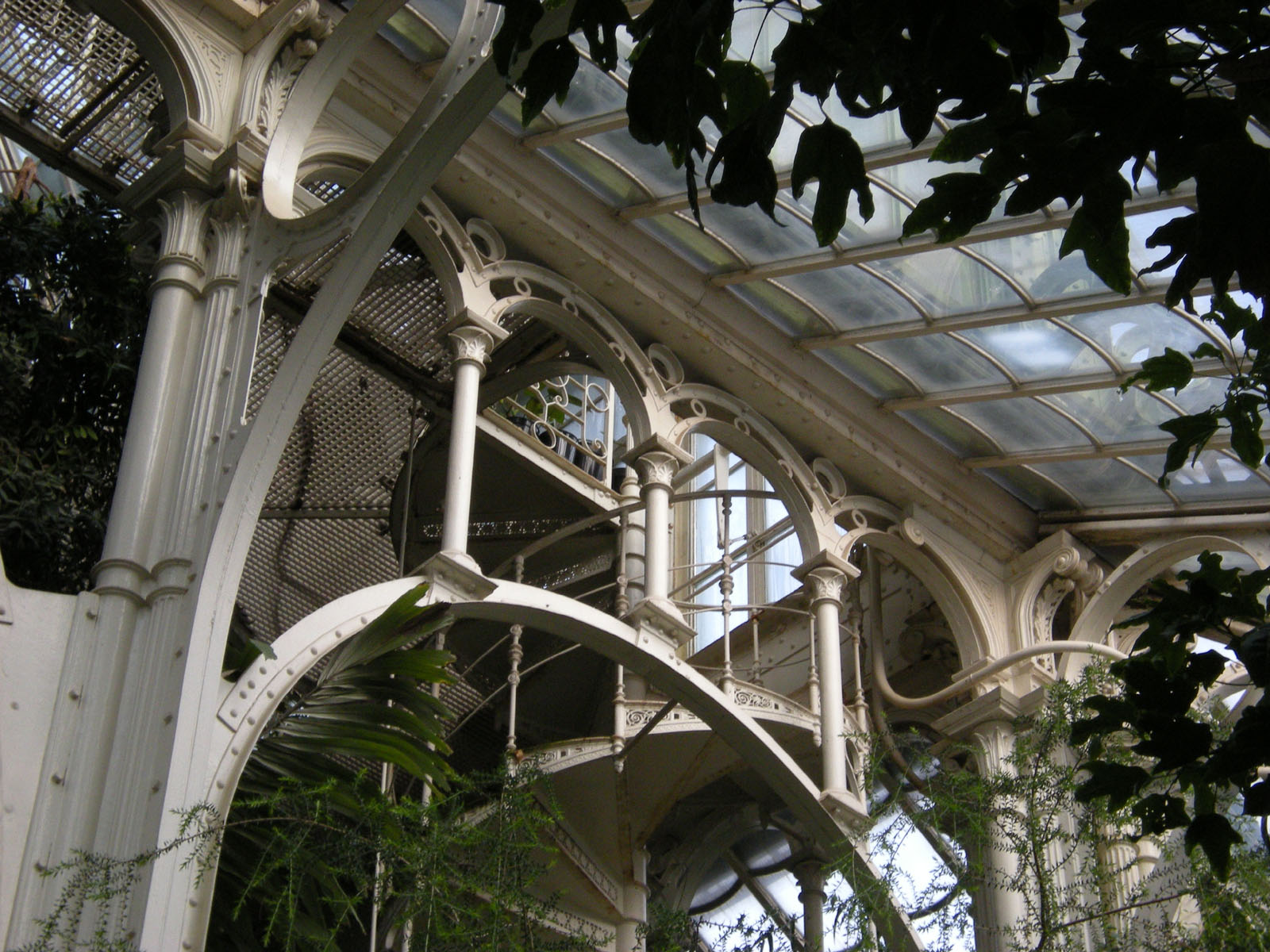
Detail of the arches sustaining the roof.

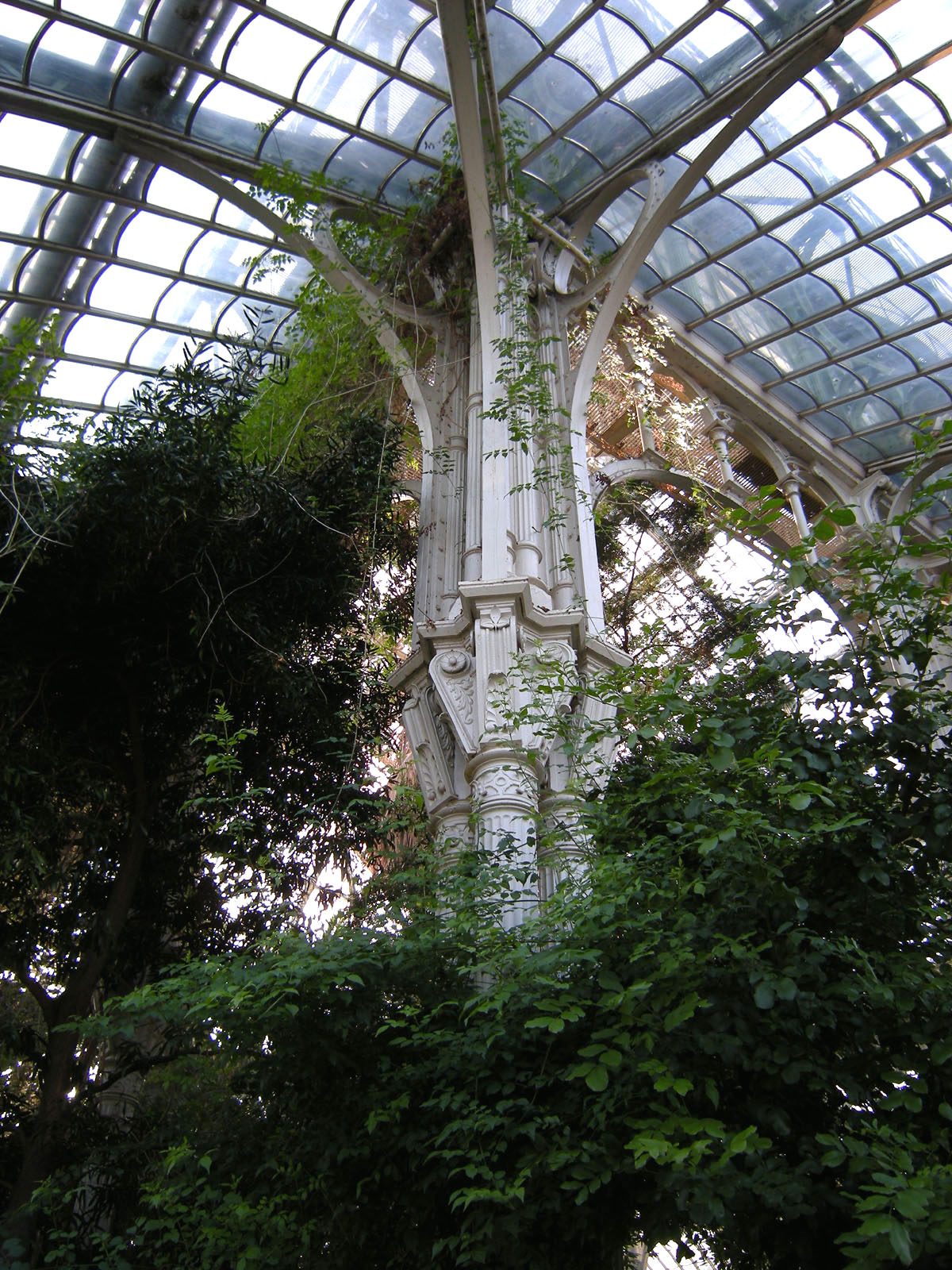
Tree-shaped cast-iron column.

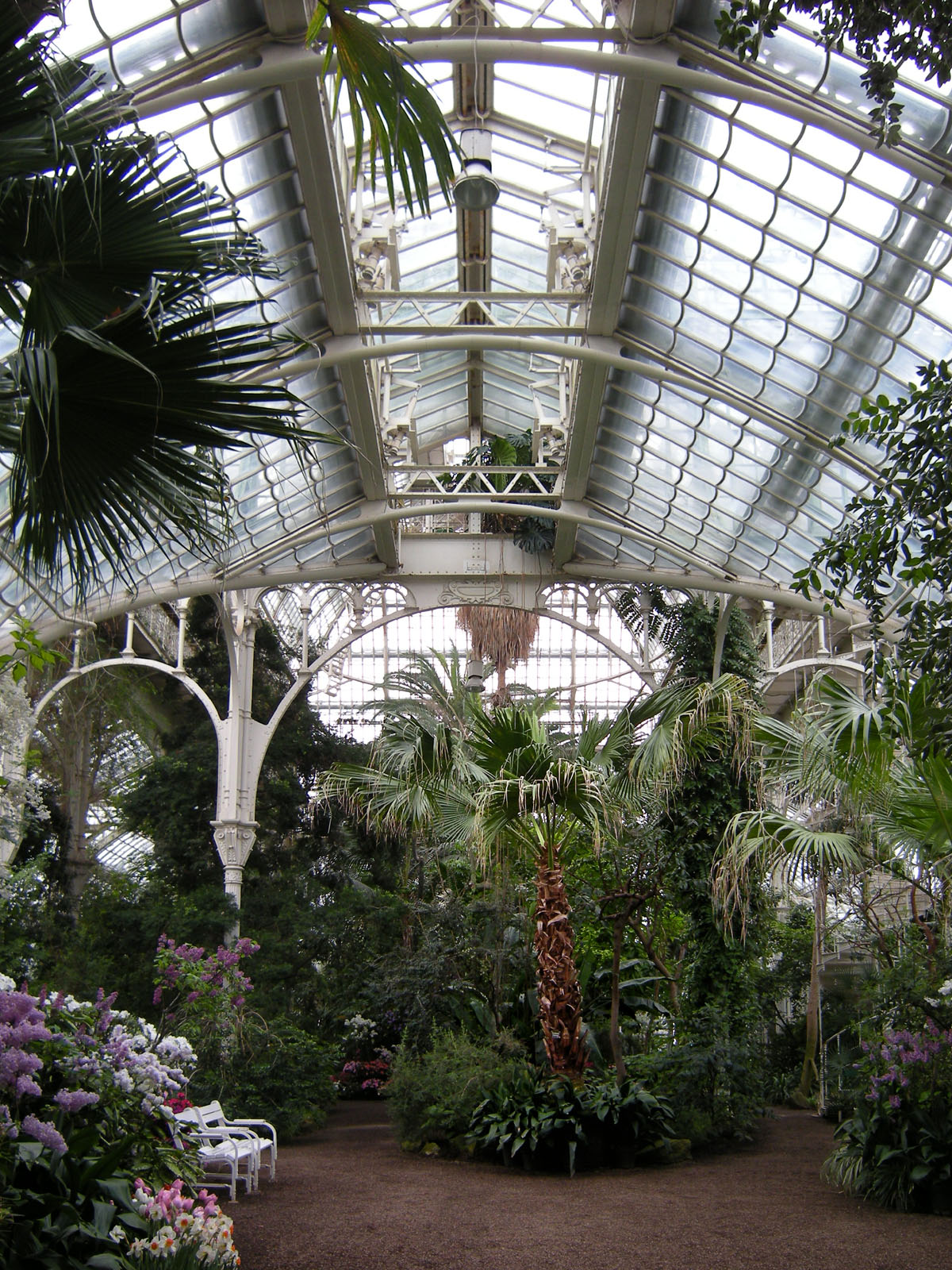
Central Hall.

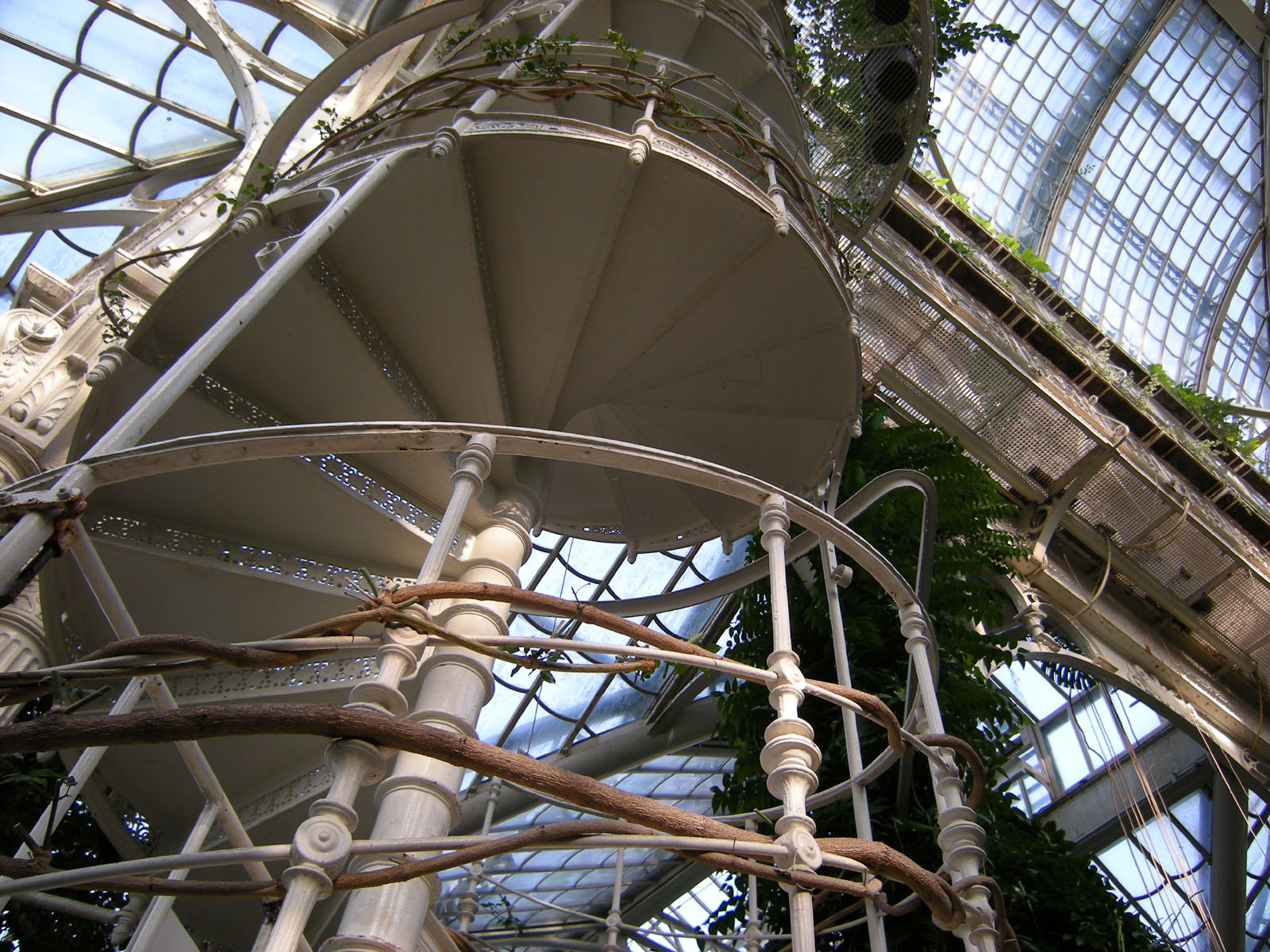
Spiral staircase.

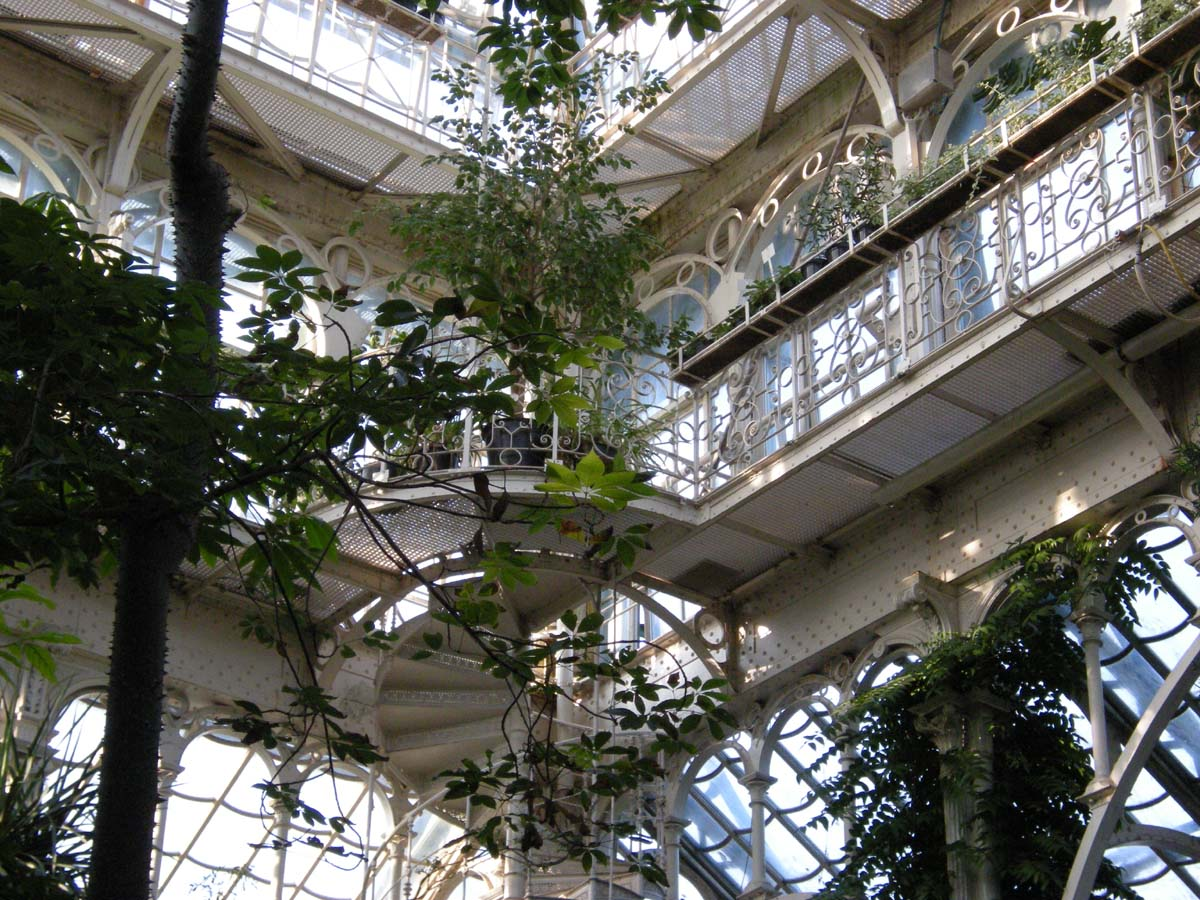
Top of the stairs and galleries.

== Notable features ==
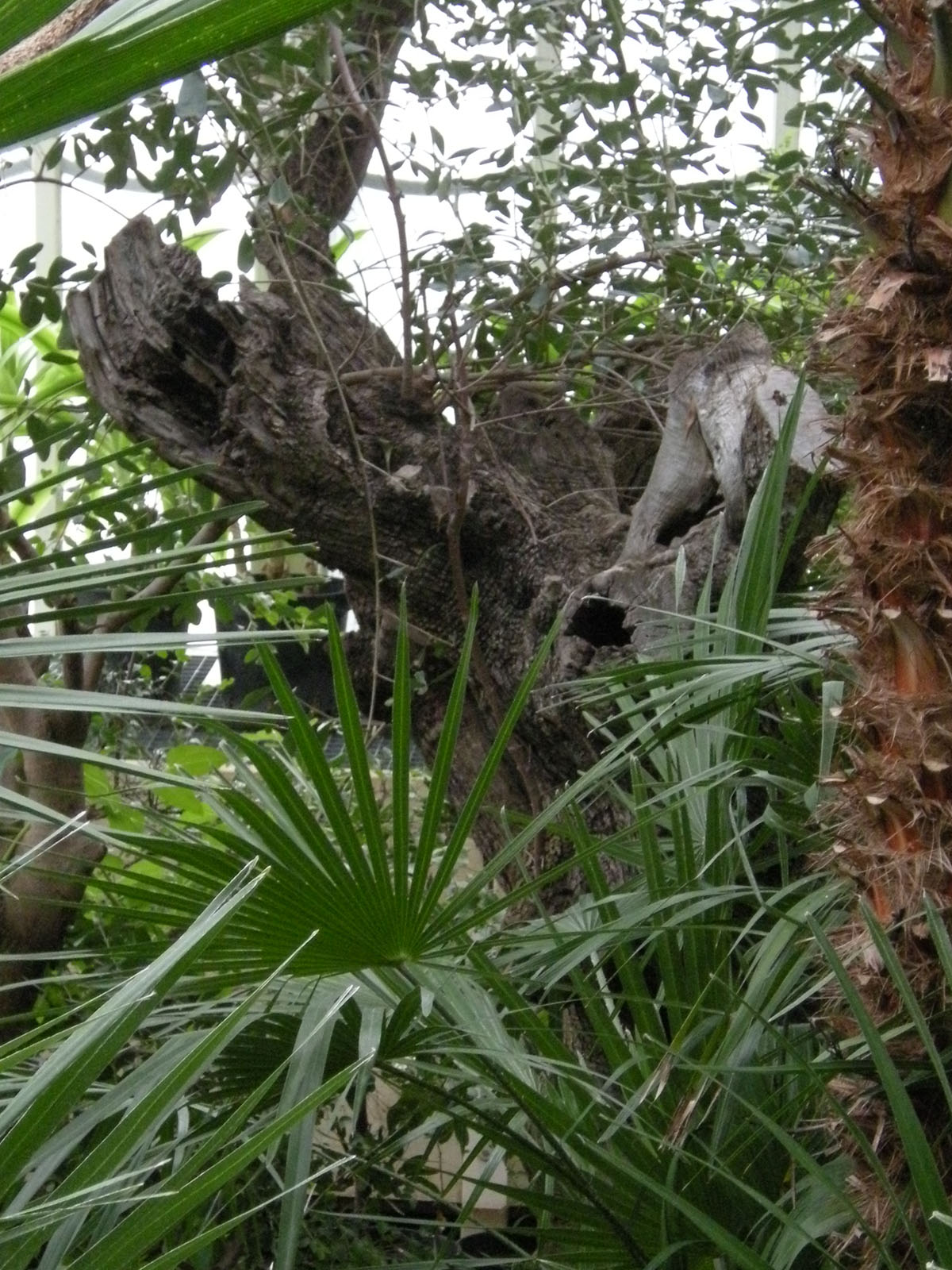
The 350-year-old olive tree

- The oldest plant by some distance is a roughly 350-year-old olive tree donated by Spain in 1974.
- A Wollemia, a so-called “living fossil” species, discovered in 1994. This one is on permanent loan from the Botanical Garden of the University of Vienna and is one of the few to be cultivated outside Australia.
- A coco de mer, donated by the Seychelles in 1990 and not expected to blossom for around 50 to 100 years.
- A victoria waterlily, which blossomed in 2001 for the first time in more than 40 years.
- The centre of the building has traditionally been the location for the tallest plant. The current centrepiece, planted in 2008, is a Livistona chinensis known as the “Mirna palm” after the Austrian swimmer Mirna Jukić.
- Other notable collections include the azaleas and the cyatheales.

== See also ==
- Wüstenhaus Schönbrunn (Desert House), featuring succulent plants and desert fauna, located in the nearby Sonnenuhrhaus.
- There is another Palmenhaus in the Vienna Burggarten.
