= HAUS3 =

Protein-coding gene in the species Homo sapiens

Identifiers
- Aliases: HAUS3, C4orf15, IT1, dgt3, HAUS augmin like complex subunit 3
- External IDs: OMIM: 613430; MGI: 2387633; HomoloGene: 75209; GeneCards: HAUS3; OMA:HAUS3 - orthologs

Gene location (Human)
Chr.	Chromosome 4 (human)
Band	4p16.3	Start	2,078,998 bp
Band	4p16.3	End	2,242,276 bp

Gene location (Mouse)
Chr.	Chromosome 5 (mouse)
Band	5 B2|5 17.84 cM	Start	34,311,224 bp
Band	5 B2|5 17.84 cM	End	34,326,871 bp
RNA expression pattern
Bgee	Human / Mouse (ortholog); Top expressed in: secondary oocyte; gonad; Achilles tendon; ventricular zone; oral cavity; visceral pleura; parietal pleura; ganglionic eminence; bone marrow; skin of thigh / Top expressed in: primary oocyte; secondary oocyte; zygote; primitive streak; maxillary prominence; mandibular prominence; abdominal wall; thymus; epiblast; tail of embryo; More reference expression data
BioGPS	n/a
Gene ontology
Molecular function	protein binding; molecular function
Cellular component	microtubule cytoskeleton; cytoplasm; microtubule organizing center; centrosome; microtubule; HAUS complex; cytoskeleton; mitochondrion; nucleoplasm; cytosol; spindle; intercellular bridge; mitotic spindle
Biological process	spindle assembly; cell cycle; cell division; G2/M transition of mitotic cell cycle; ciliary basal body-plasma membrane docking; centrosome cycle; regulation of G2/M transition of mitotic cell cycle
Sources:Amigo / QuickGO
Orthologs
Species	Human	Mouse
Entrez	79441	231123
Ensembl	ENSG00000214367	ENSMUSG00000079555
UniProt	Q68CZ6	Q8QZX2
RefSeq (mRNA)	NM_024511; NM_001303143	NM_146159
RefSeq (protein)	NP_001290072; NP_078787	NP_666271
Location (UCSC)	Chr 4: 2.08 – 2.24 Mb	Chr 5: 34.31 – 34.33 Mb
PubMed search
- Wikidata
View/Edit Human	View/Edit Mouse

HAUS augmin-like complex subunit 3 is a protein that in humans is encoded by the HAUS3 gene.
