= G. J. George House =

Historic house in Illinois, United States

- U.S. National Register of Historic Places
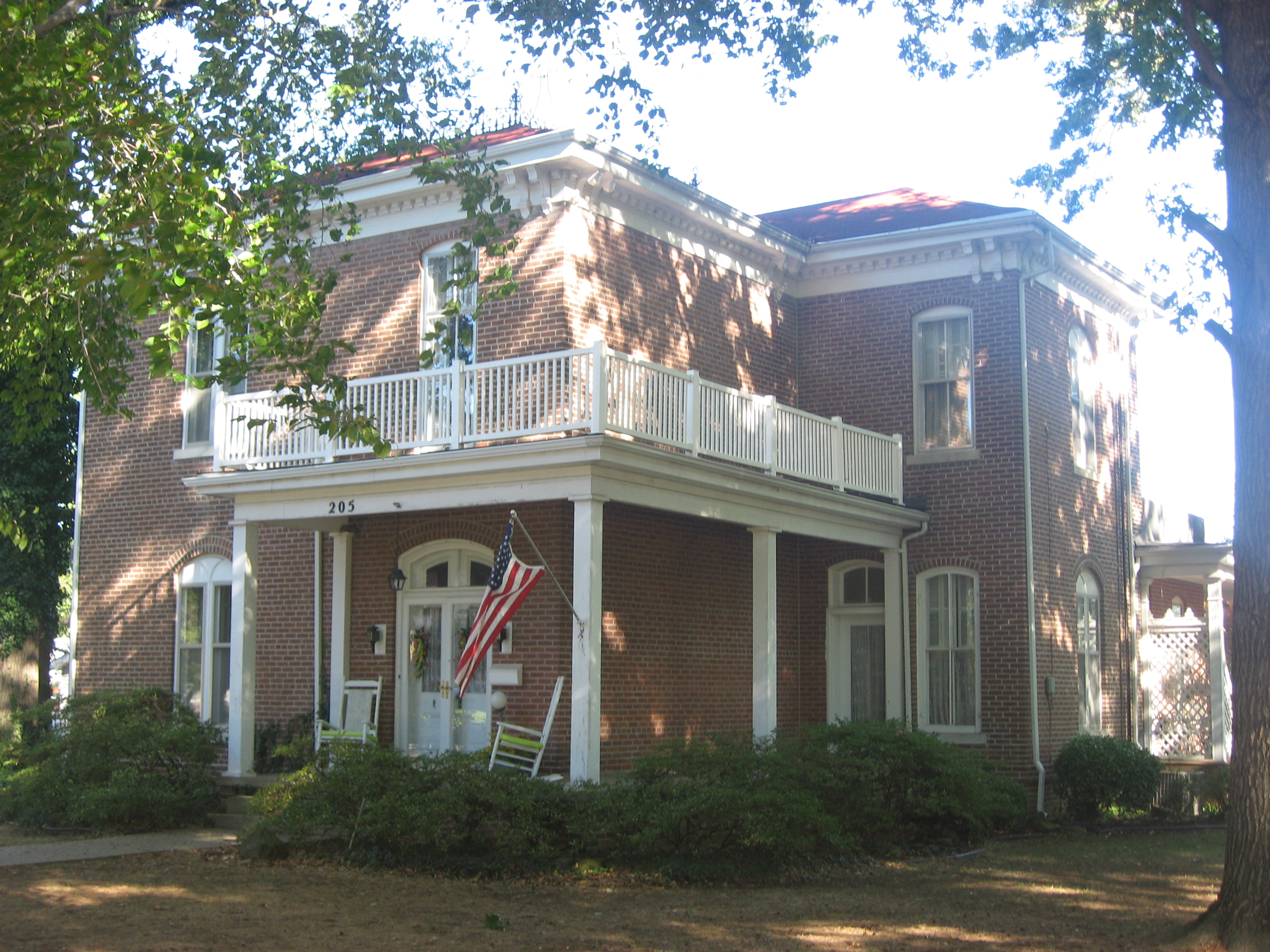

- Location within Illinois Location within the United States
- Location: 205 W. Center, Fairfield, Illinois
- Coordinates: 38°22′40″N 88°21′46″W
- Area: less than one acre
- Architect: Chittenden, George
- Architectural style: Italianate
- NRHP reference No.: 06000006
- Added to NRHP: February 9, 2006

The G. J. George House is a historic house located at 205 W. Center St. in Fairfield, Illinois. The house was built in 1877 or 1878 for G. J. George, a Civil War veteran and local lawyer. Local architect George Chittenden designed the two-story brick house in the Italianate style. The house features porches on all four sides, including one at the front entrance; the L-shaped entrance porch has a balustrade along the edge of its roof. The house's tall, rectangular windows are topped by brick arches. A bracketed and dentillated cornice runs along the house's roof line. The cross-hipped roof has an iron fence along its ridge.

The house was added to the National Register of Historic Places on February 9, 2006.
