= House (steamboat) =

Cabin structure of a steamboat

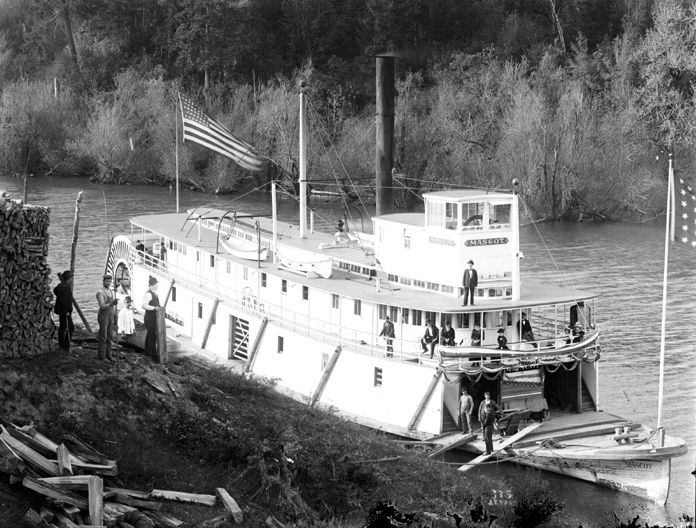
The Columbia river steamer Mascot. The built up cabins aft of the open front deck are collectively called the "house."

House is a steamboat term referring to the cabin structure of a steamboat. Generally the house includes every structure on steamboat built above the first deck, which is usually called the freight deck or the engine deck.
