= Haus Cumberland =

Listed Building in Berlin

Coordinates: 52°30′3″N 13°19′1″E

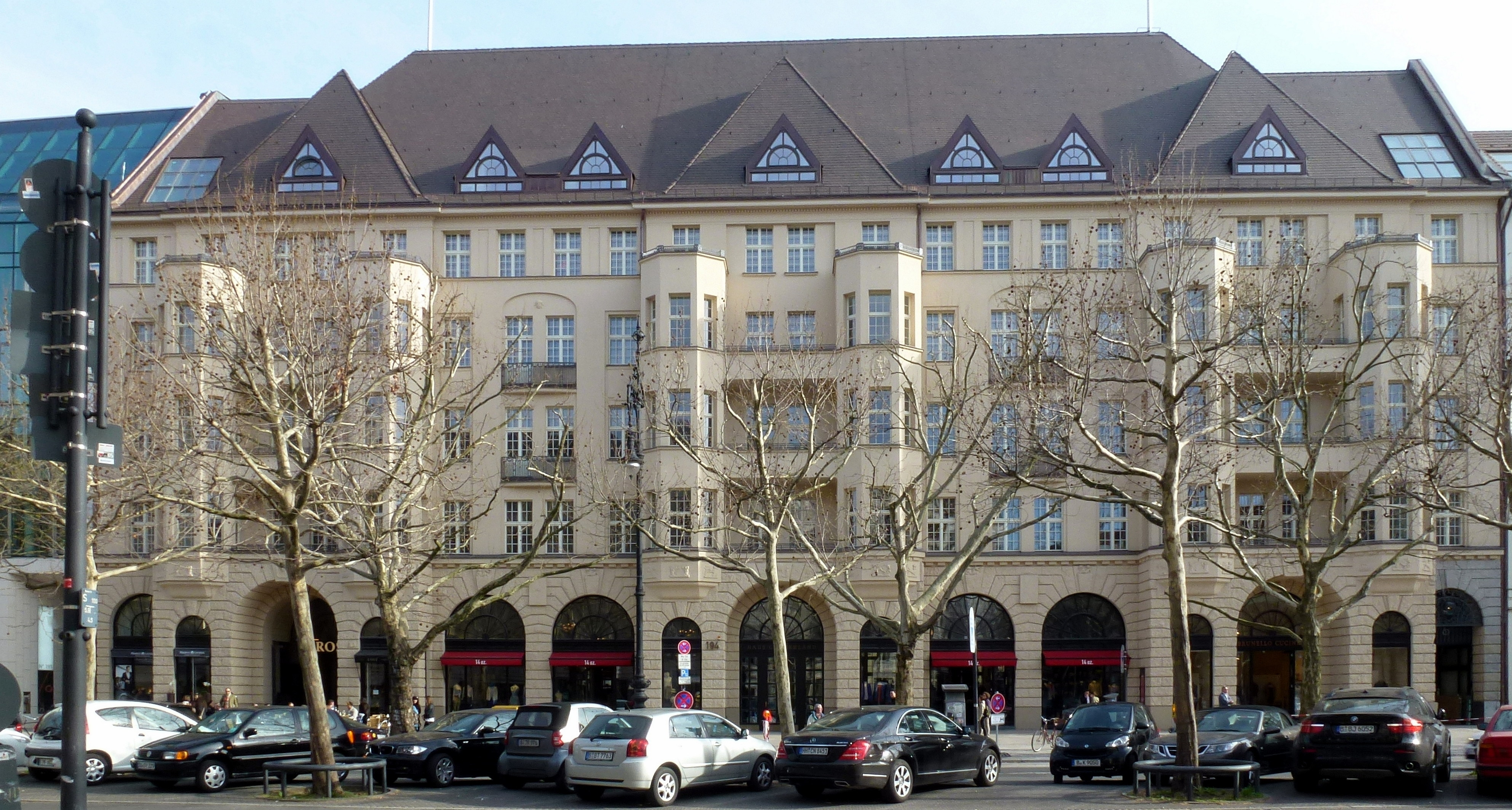
The Haus Cumberland in April 2013, in Charlottenburg, Berlin

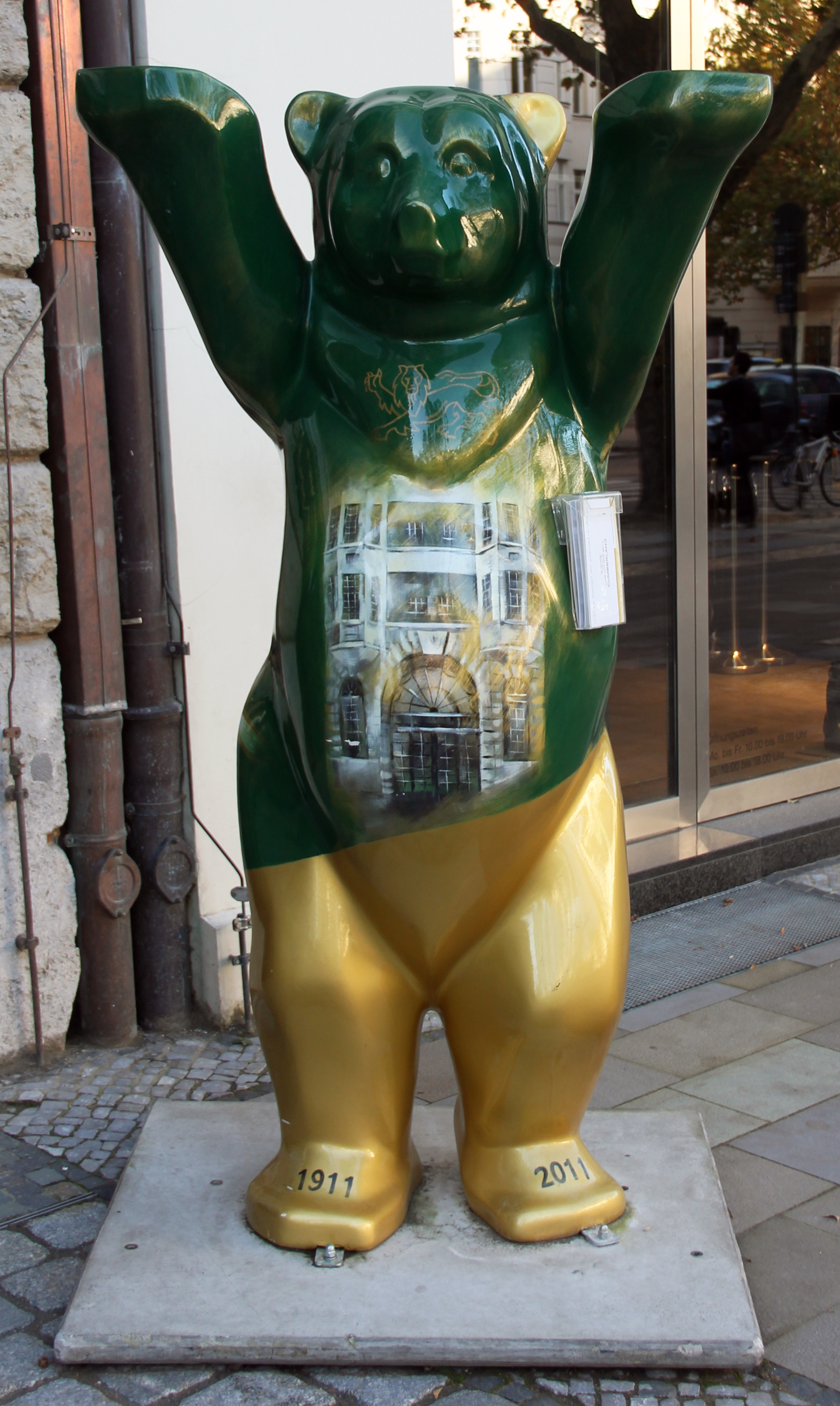
The Cumberland-Buddy Bear in front of the Haus Cumberland

The Haus Cumberland (simply translated as Cumberland House) is a Grade II listed building on the Kurfürstendamm avenue between Bleibtreu and Schlüterstraße in Charlottenburg, Berlin. It was built in 1911, and has served as a hotel and as headquarters for several administrations. In 2011, the building was restored and converted to a commercial and residential building.

== History ==
The building was initially designed to be an apartment hotel in 1911 by Robert Leibnitz (known for designing the Hotel Adlon in Unter den Linden), and was later built the same year. The building was named for marketing reasons as Cumberland, after Ernest Augustus, Crown Prince of Hanover, 3rd Duke of Cumberland and Teviotdale. The building was planned to be 60 feet (18 m) wide and 180 feet (55 m) in height, and contains three courtyards with fountains, according to the plan. The complex covers around 10,000 square metres (110,000 sq ft) land area between Kurfürstendamm and Lietzenburger Straße 104–106. Many of the hotel suites were designed to be rented to domestic staff. This business idea later failed before the final opening of the building after the owner went into bankruptcy. The inventory and furniture were later auctioned off.

In 1914, the building temporarily housed the Waffen und Munitionsbeschaffungsamt (Arms and Ammunition Procurement Office (Wumba)). In the same year, it was converted to a Grand Hotel, rebuilt with 700 beds. After the First World War, the building housed the main post office building. From 1920, it housed the Ministry of Economics, theatres and cinemas. Since 1936, it housed various offices for tax authorities. From 1966 to 2003, the Berliner Oberfinanzdirektion (Berlin Regional Finance) offices were located in the building. Since then, the building has been empty, except for shops on the ground floor.

In 2004, the Haus Cumberland was renamed for a short period of time as the Cumberland Hotel Brecker for the film The Bourne Supremacy. In 2005, it was temporarily the film set for a ZDF television series. In 2006, the ORCO group announced that it had bought the building for €40,000,000 from the owners of the state of Berlin and the federal government. ORCO initially planned to build a luxury hotel and luxury shopping mall.

On 13 May 2011, there was a major fire in the attic of the building, and two construction workers and a fire-fighter were slightly injured. The fire also damaged the left side of the roof, causing that section to fall in. The dome of the first courtyard, which was made of galvanized steel, also collapsed. The fire was accidentally triggered during the renovation work.

On September 14, 2013, the official handover of Haus Cumberland was celebrated. The housing complex for 500 residents includes 166 freehold apartments and 17 penthouses.
