= Marcel Hauss =

French flying ace

- Born: 31 July 1890; Paris, France
- Died: 15 February 1917 (aged 26); Saint-Mihiel, France
- Burial place: Cimetière parisien de Pantin, Pantin, France
- Military career
- Allegiance: France
- Branch: Flying service
- Rank: Maréchal des logis
- Unit: Escadrille N57
- Awards: Médaille militaire Croix de Guerre

Maréchal-des-logis Marcel Hauss was a French World War I flying ace credited with five aerial victories.

== Biography ==
See also Aerial victory standards of World War I

Marcel Hauss was born in Paris on 31 July 1890.

He began his military service as a Cuirassier, but transferred to aviation in September 1915. He graduated from pilot training in mid-1916. On 10 December 1916, he was posted to Escadrille N.57. Between 27 December 1916 and 29 January 1917, he was confirmed to have helped shoot down five German airplanes, with a sixth victory going uncredited.

On 15 February 1917, he was shot down and killed while attacking a German two-seated reconnaissance aircraft above Saint-Mihiel.
