= Mel House =

American film director

Mel House (born December 27, 1976, in Houston, Texas) is a filmmaker best known for his features in the horror and science fiction genres.

== Biography ==
His directorial debut was the independent film Fade to Black, which was followed by Witchcraft 13 (2007) and Closet Space (2007).

In 2007, he directed a zombie-themed music video for musician Jonah Matranga's single "Not About A Girl Or A Place".

In the Summer of 2008, House directed the science fiction/horror film Walking Distance in Houston and Galveston, Texas, prior to the city's destruction from Hurricane Ike. He appears in the Science-Fiction horror film Renfield: The Undead, directed by Bob Willems. He was a special guest of the 2010 Dallas International Film Festival.

== Filmography (as director) ==
- Fade to Black (2001)
- Witchcraft 13: Blood of the Chosen (2007)
- Closet Space (2007)
- Jonah Matranga in Not About A Girl Or A Place (music video) (2007)
- Psychic Experiment (formally Walking Distance) (2009)

== Personal life ==
House is married to actress Melanie Donihoo.
