= Haus der Musik =

Museum of sound and music in Vienna, Austria

Coordinates: 48°12′15″N 16°22′24″E

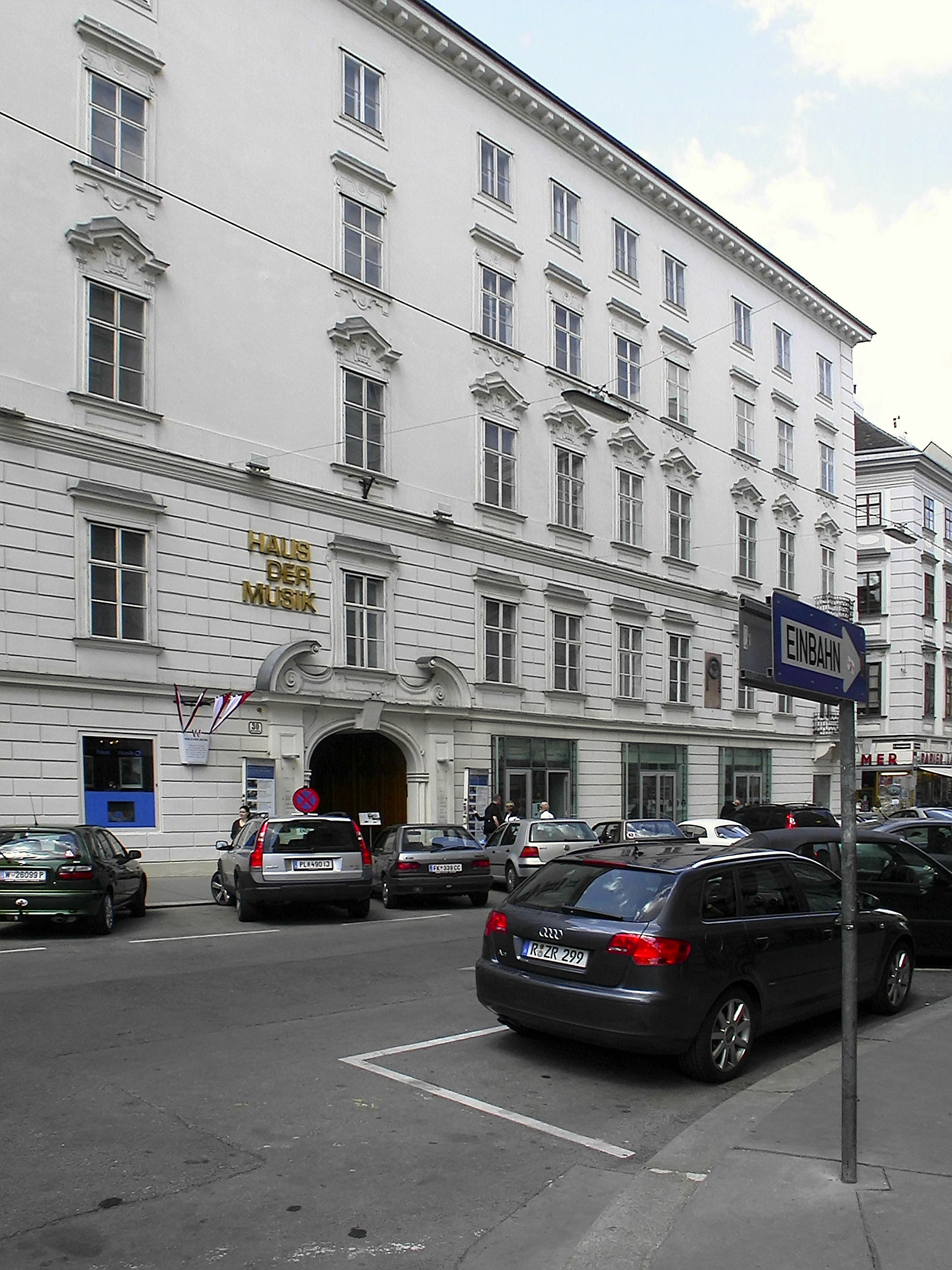
The Haus der Musik.

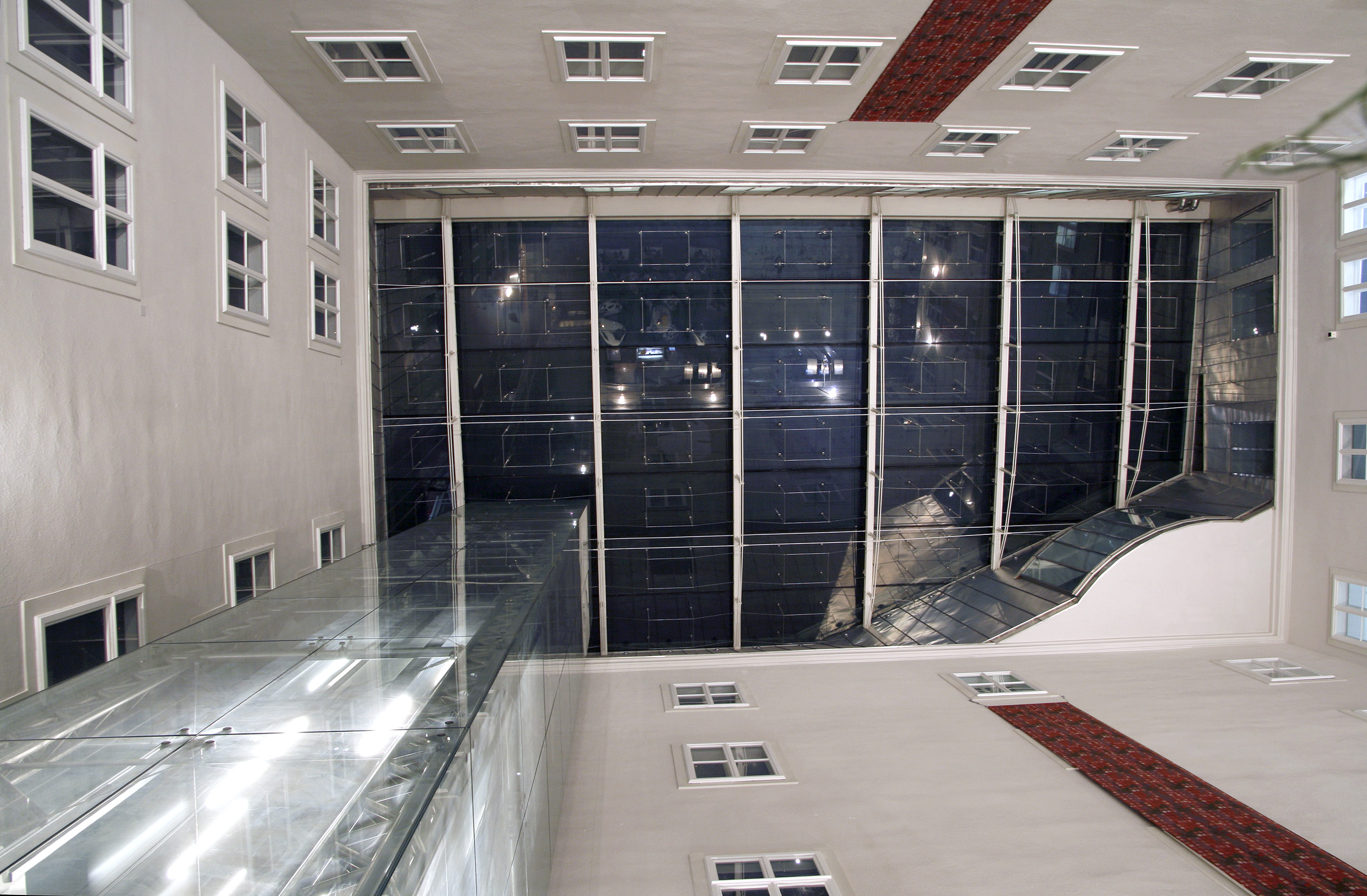
The roofed courtyard of the Palais.

The Haus der Musik (House of Music) in Vienna opened in 2000, and is the first museum of sound and music in Austria. Across an exhibition space of 54,000 sq. ft., a range of hi-tech interactive and multimedia presentations introduce the world of music, from the earliest human use of instruments to the music of the present day.

Those involved in developing the museum included four Austrian universities, two foreign university institutes, a team of musicians and music theorists, artists from multimedia and other areas, sound technicians, architects, and students. In 2002 the Haus der Musik was awarded the Austrian Museum Prize for its innovative conception.

The Haus der Musik is located in the Palace of Archduke Charles, where Otto Nicolai, founder of the Vienna Philharmonic, lived around 150 years ago. Its honorary president is the Indian conductor Zubin Mehta. In 2009 it was the 19th most popular attraction in Vienna, with 205,000 visitors.

== See also ==
- List of music museums
