= Wüstenhaus Schönbrunn =

Architectural structure

Coordinates: 48°11′05″N 16°18′06″E

The Wüstenhaus Schönbrunn (Schönbrunn Desert House) is a desert botanical exhibit in Vienna, Austria. It is located in the Sonnenuhrhaus ("Sundial House"), which was built in 1904 as the newest of the four botanical houses in Schönbrunn Palace Park. The desert exhibit opened in 2004 as a counterpart to the "Rainforest House" that opened in 2002 in the nearby Vienna Zoo.

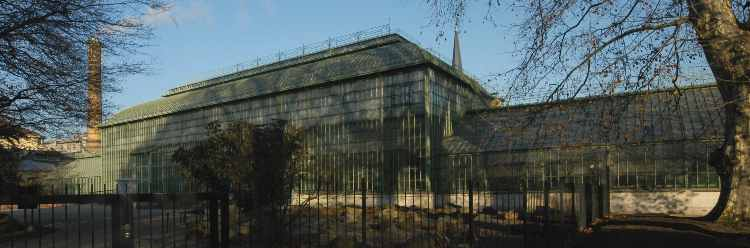
South facade of the Sundial House

== History ==
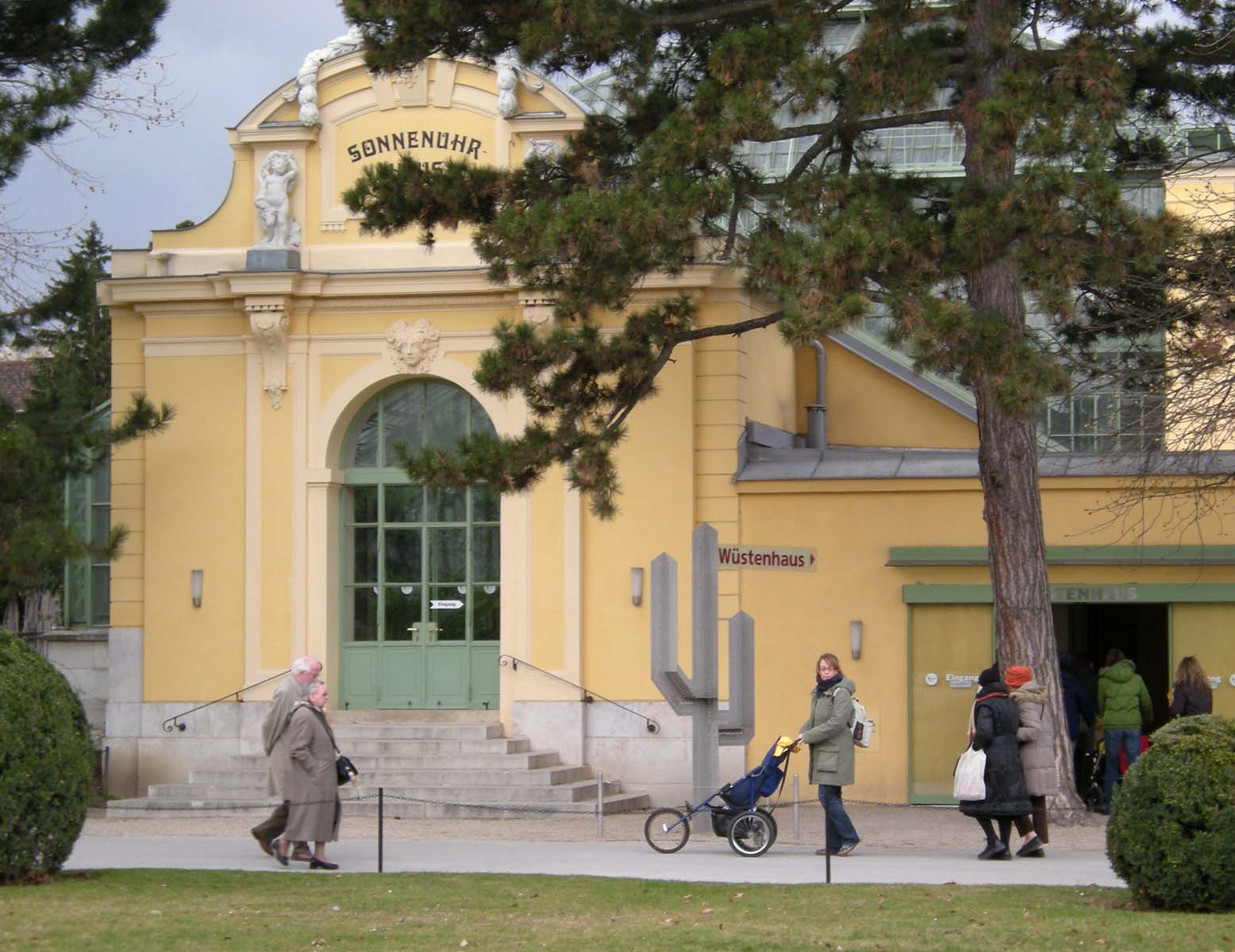
East side

The Sundial House stands opposite the Schönbrunn Palm House (Palmenhaus; another botanical exhibit), directly between the Hietzing Gate and the Zoo. The unprepossessing building owes its name to the sundial (Sonnenuhr) located in the gardens to the south.

It was built with the encouragement of Charles von Hügel – diplomat, explorer and founder of the Vienna Horticultural Society – to replace an earlier greenhouse which could no longer meet its plants' needs. At first, it housed the plants of the extensive “New Holland Collection”, which Hügel had assembled and had been acquired by the Imperial Court in 1848, and later expanded with plants from southern Africa and the Americas that required similar conditions. The architect of the 1904 building was Alphons Custodis.

An air raid in February 1945, which almost totally destroyed the windows of the nearby Palm House, left the bulk of the Sundial House's glazing intact, probably because the Palm House stood between it and the bombed area, and because the Sundial House had windows which were roughly parallel to the spreading blast waves (unlike the Palm House). A number of plants from the Palm House were therefore brought here for safekeeping, where space allowed. The Sundial House again served as a refuge between 1986 and 1990, while the Palm House was renovated.

In April 1990 the first butterfly zoo in Austria was established in the Sundial House, but it was transferred to the greenhouse in the Burggarten in 1998.

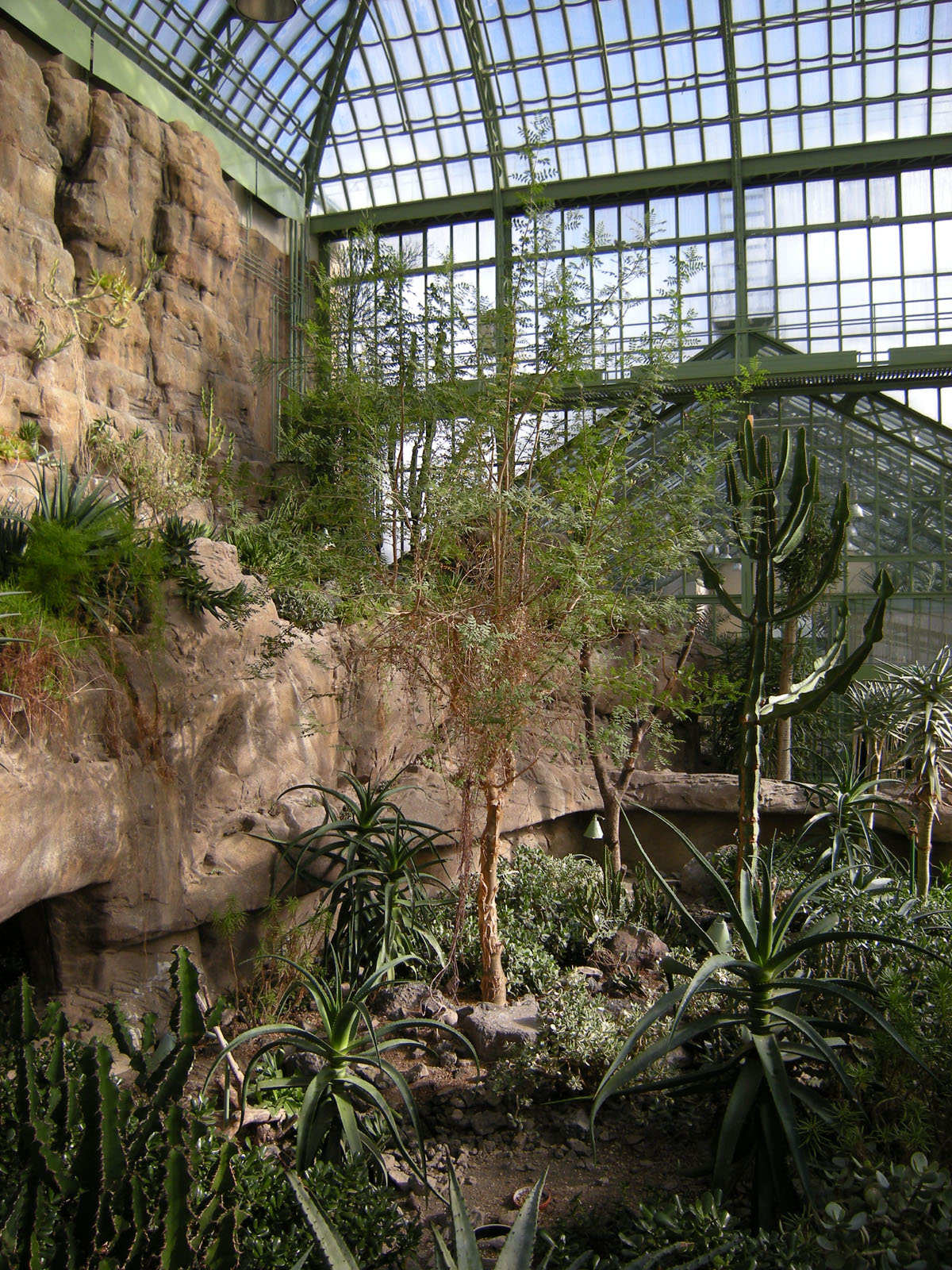
Plants in the main hall.

Rust on the steel framework caused the building to be closed in 1998 and renovated from 2000 to 2003. The Desert House was finally established here by a joint project between the Zoo and the Austrian Federal Gardens (Bundesgärten), which have managed the building since 1918 as successor to the Imperial and Royal Court Gardens. The exhibition includes succulent plants from the Federal Gardens, and small animals under the care of the Zoo, such as desert jerboas, reptiles and birds.

=== Notable features ===
- Two Welwitschias (one male and one female), the rare and endangered desert plant discovered in 1859 by the Austrian Friedrich Welwitsch. They can live up to 2,000 years; the two individuals in the Desert House, however, stem from the Frankfurt University Botanic Gardens and are no more than 40 years old.
- The distinctive, rose-like cactus Pereskia.

== Architecture ==
300 ft. long, 45 ft. wide and 50 ft. high, the building is fully glazed on the roof and the south face, while the north face is walled up. With a total floor space of 14,000 sq. ft., the interior is divided lengthwise into three sections; there are two annexes to the central section, namely a plant-rich east wing which serves as the entrance hall, and a west wing used as a coldhouse.
