= House (legislature) =

House is a term commonly used to refer to a number of legislative bodies.

Specific examples include:

- Lower house, one of two chambers of a bicameral legislature
  - House of Commons, the elected lower house of the bicameral parliaments of the United Kingdom and Canada
  - House of Representatives, a name used for legislative bodies in many countries
    - United States House of Representatives
- Upper house, one of two chambers of a bicameral legislature
  - House of Lords, the upper house of the Parliament of the United Kingdom
- House of Burgesses, the first elected legislative assembly in the New World, established in the Colony of Virginia

== See also ==
Debate chamber
