= Stock im Eisen =

Monument in Vienna, Austria

Coordinates: 48.2079°N 16.3717°E

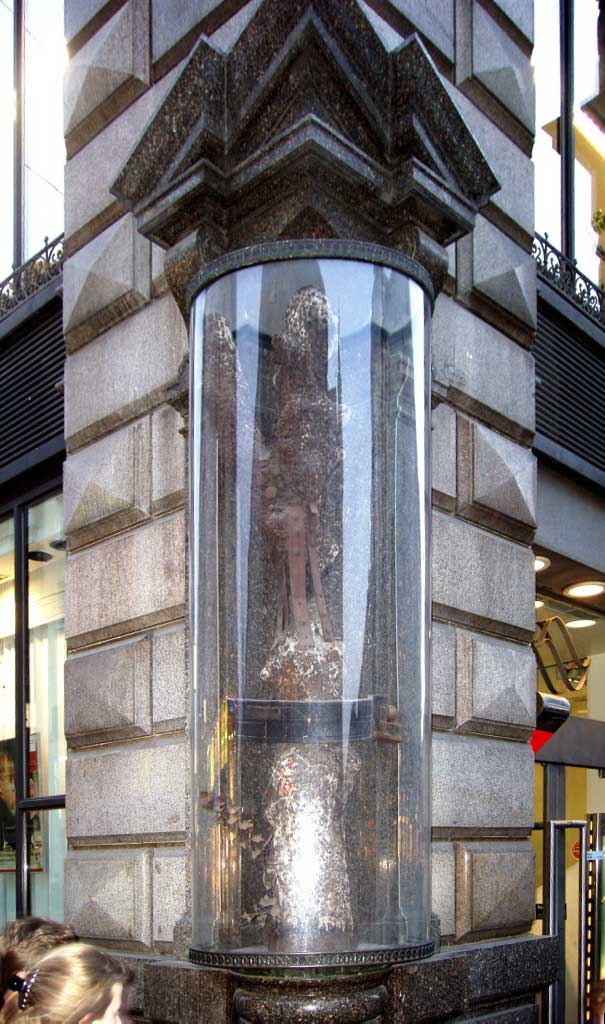
The Stock im Eisen, behind glass on the corner of the Palais Equitable

The Stock im Eisen (German: "staff in iron") is the midsection of a tree-trunk from the Middle Ages, a so-called nail-tree (Nagelbaum), into which hundreds of nails have been pounded for good luck over centuries. It is located in Vienna, Austria, in Stock-im-Eisen-Platz, now part of Stephansplatz, at the corner of the Graben and Kärntner Straße and is now behind glass on a corner of the Palais Equitable.

== History ==
The trunk section is 2.19 m (7 feet 2 inches) tall and is held in place by five iron bands; the iron bears the date 1575 and the initials HB, presumably for Hans Buettinger, the house owner who had the iron replaced. The tree was a forked spruce which started to grow around 1400 and was felled in approximately 1440, as was revealed by examination in 1975. There was regrowth in the middle of the trunk after blows from an axe. The first nails were inserted while the tree was still alive (thus before 1440). The first written mention of it dates to 1533; in 1548, it was already located on the wall of a house in what became Stock-im-Eisen-Platz.

The Palais Equitable, which was built on the site in 1891, incorporates the Stock im Eisen in a niche. It stands on a base made of Czech hornblende granite. Wrought iron vines were added, and the building has Zum Stock-im-Eisen (At the Stock im Eisen) carved above the door and a bronze sculpture group of locksmith apprentices and the tree trunk, by Rudolf Weyr, in the tympanum. In addition, there are a pair of representations of the legend by the same artist on the doors.

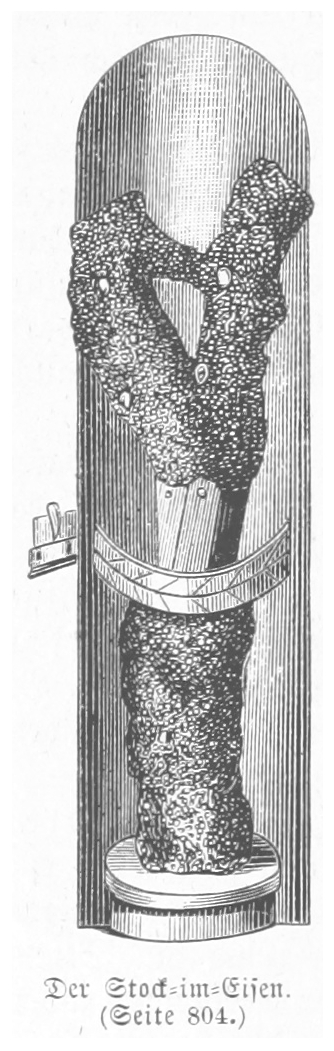
Illustration from Bermann Alt- und Neu-Wien (1880)

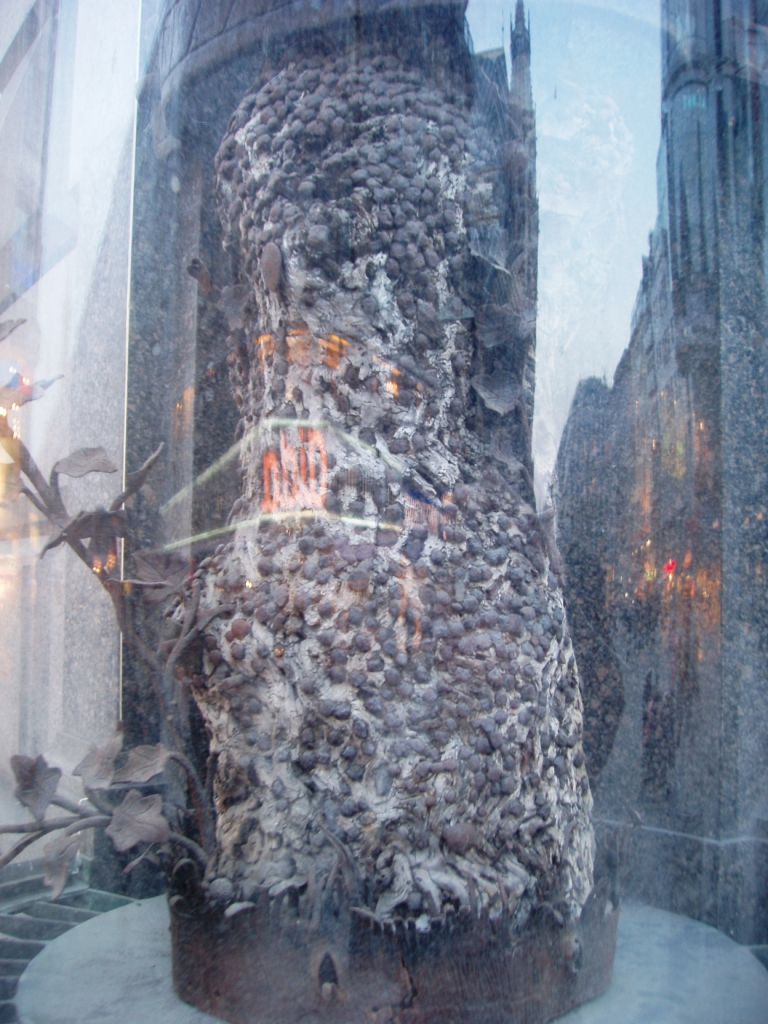
Another view of the Stock im Eisen today

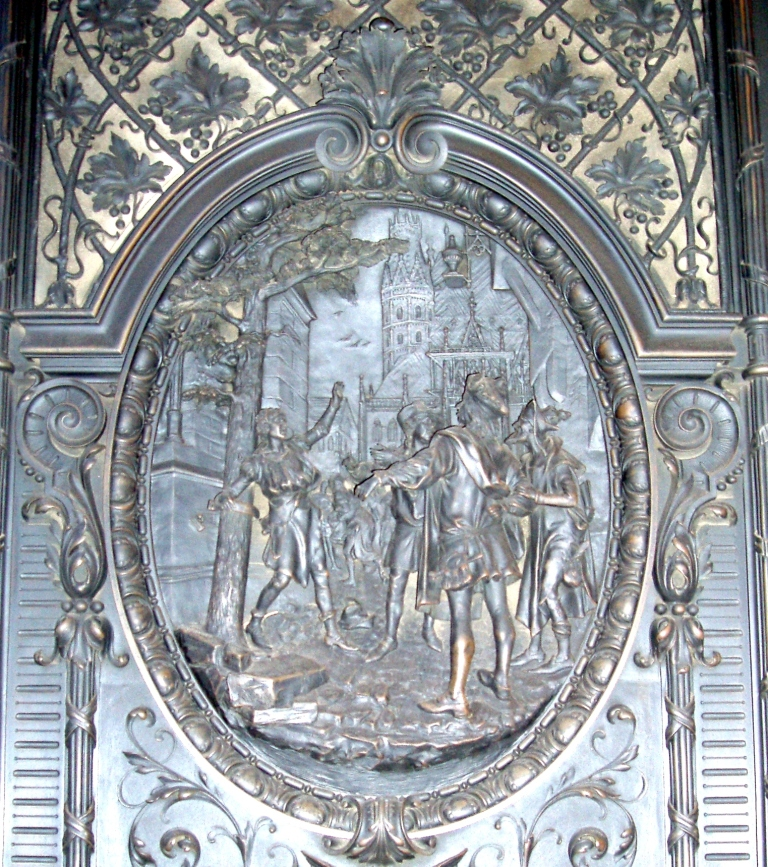
One of the reliefs on the door of the Palais Equitable illustrating the legend of the Stock im Eisen

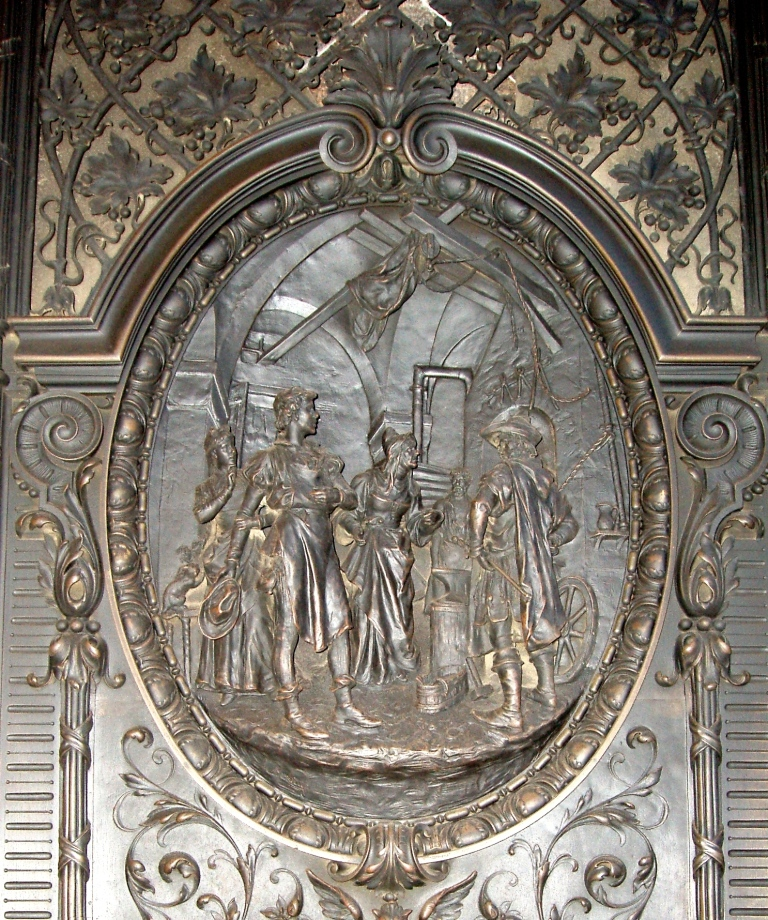
Second relief illustrating the legend

== Significance ==
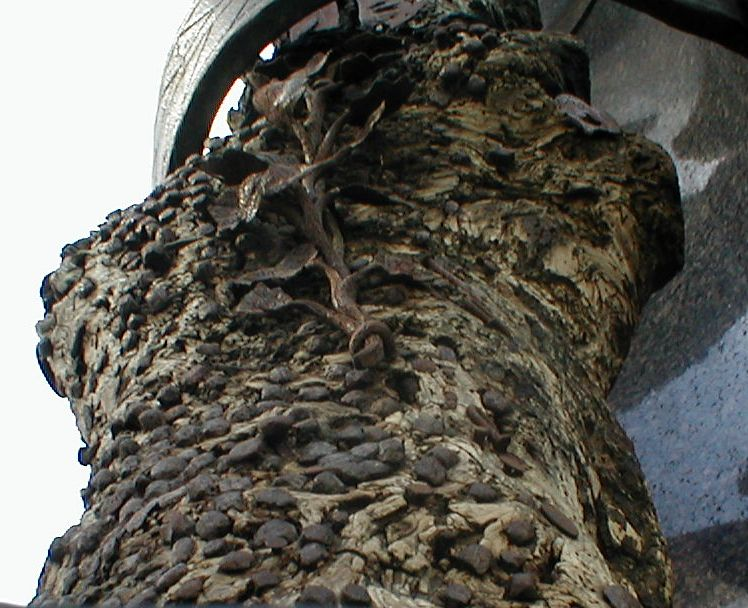
Close-up view of the tree trunk and the nails hammered into it

In the 18th century, a custom developed that travelling smiths and apprentices would hammer a nail into the tree trunk; in particular, from 1715 on, wandering journeyman locksmiths. The reason for doing so before then is unknown; however, it is unlikely to have been a craft guild custom in the beginning, because the Stock im Eisen is significantly older. "Nail trees" are well known in Southeastern Europe and are found in many cities in Hungary, Romania (in Transylvania) and other countries of the former Austro-Hungarian Empire; the Vienna Stock im Eisen is the oldest preserved nail tree. The custom persisted until the late 19th century, and inspired the "men of iron" statues that were used for propaganda and fund-raising in Germany and Austria in World War I, particularly the tree set up in Freiburg.

The most likely explanation for the medieval nails is the ancient custom of hammering nails into crosses, trees and even rocks for protection or in gratitude for healing, that is as a votive offering, similar to throwing coins into a wishing well or a pond. In the Middle Ages, nails were a valuable commodity that people did not waste. The original mythico-religious and legal significance of the Stock im Eisen was effaced in later centuries by an emphasis on crafts.

Leopold Schmidt suggested that the tree was originally used as a surveying point defining the "mythic centre" of the city.

== Legends ==
Many legends surround the Stock im Eisen, mostly dating to the 17th and 18th centuries. In 1703 it was said to be the last remaining tree from the ancient forest; the 1911 Encyclopædia Britannica says it is the last of a sacred grove around which the city sprang up.

One legend recounts that the Devil himself put the tree trunk in irons, or at least guards it. Another tells that a locksmith's apprentice who stole a valuable nail from his master, or wanted to marry his master's daughter, learnt from the Devil how to make an unopenable lock with which to enclose it, and in one version also an identical nail to hammer in beside the stolen one. However, the details of the legends betray their lack of truth. The padlock which guides to Vienna often refer to as "unopenable" is only for show, and cannot be opened simply because the insides of the lock are no longer there and so it will not accept a key. Already in 1533 it is referred to as Stock der im Eisen liegt, "staff that lies in irons". In addition, the well known legend recounts that a thief hammered a stolen nail into the tree as he was fleeing through the forest. Admittedly, the tree was certainly outside the city walls in 1440, but the legend only appeared in the 17th century, when the area was already urban and the Stock im Eisen mounted on the side of a house, and hence is presumably pure invention.

The legends of the Devil and the Stock im Eisen are the subject of an 1880 ballet by Pasquale Borri, to music by Franz Doppler.

A modern legend holds that the Stock im Eisen is a replica and that the original – or at least parts of it – is exhibited in the Vienna Museum. This is not true; the tree trunk has neither been divided up nor replicated in recent times.

A commentary about this trunk was given in 1856 by Theodore Nielsen, a Danish kleinsmith journeyman in his memoirs:

Outside Stefan church was a place called "Stock im Eisen" and a boutique in which was a large portrait of a Danish King Frederick VI. The park gets its name from a large tree trunk that stands in one corner with an iron fence around it. The trunk is covered with iron nails so tight from the root up that one could not get room for even a needle between. It is a peculiar sight and this is the legend: Once upon a time there was a castle nearby with a gatelock that was so intricate that even another kleinsmith could not take it apart or unlock it. In the honor of the lock and in his memory every journeyman kleinsmith who found work in Vienna had to hammer a nail into the trunk. It had been there for many a year and was still worth seeing being protected as it is by local pride.

== Sources ==
- Alfred Burgerstein. Der 'Stock im Eisen' der Stadt Wien. Vienna, 1893.
- Leopold Schmidt. "Der 'Stock im Eisen' als mythischer Stadtmittelpunkt Wiens". Jahrbuch des Vereines für Geschichte der Stadt Wien 10 (1952/53), pp. 75–81.
