= Graben, Vienna =

Public square in Austria

Coordinates: 48°12′31″N 16°22′09″E

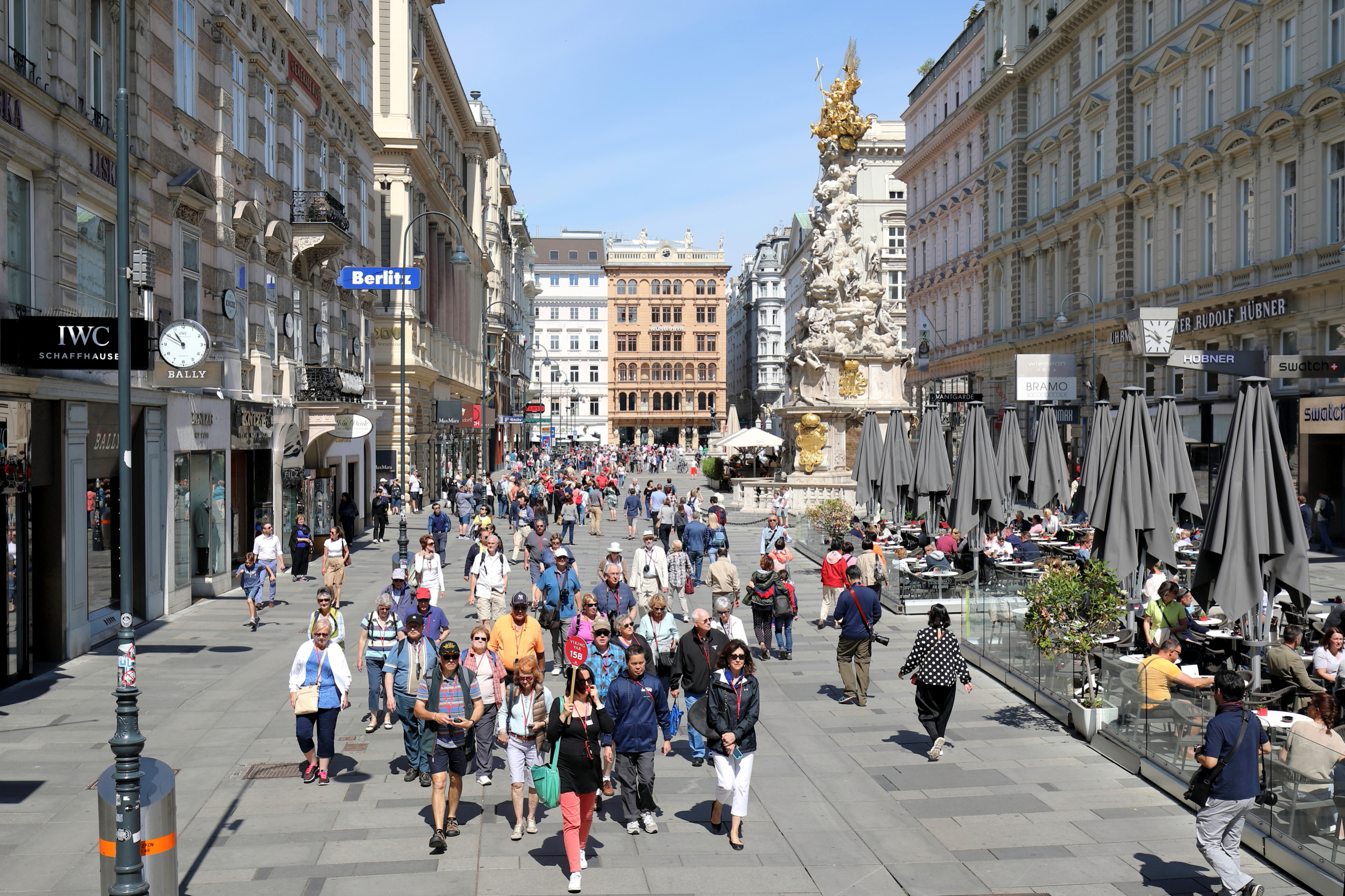
Graben near the Pestsäule, Vienna

The Graben (Austrian German pronunciation: [ˈɡraːbn̩]) is one of the most famous squares in Vienna's first district, the city center. It begins at Stock-im-Eisen-Platz next to the Palais Equitable, and ends at the junction of Kohlmarkt and Tuchlauben. Another street in the first district is called Tiefer Graben (deep ditch). It is crossed by Wipplinger Straße by means of the Hohe Brücke, a bridge about 10 meters (33 ft) above street level.

== History ==
=== Origins ===
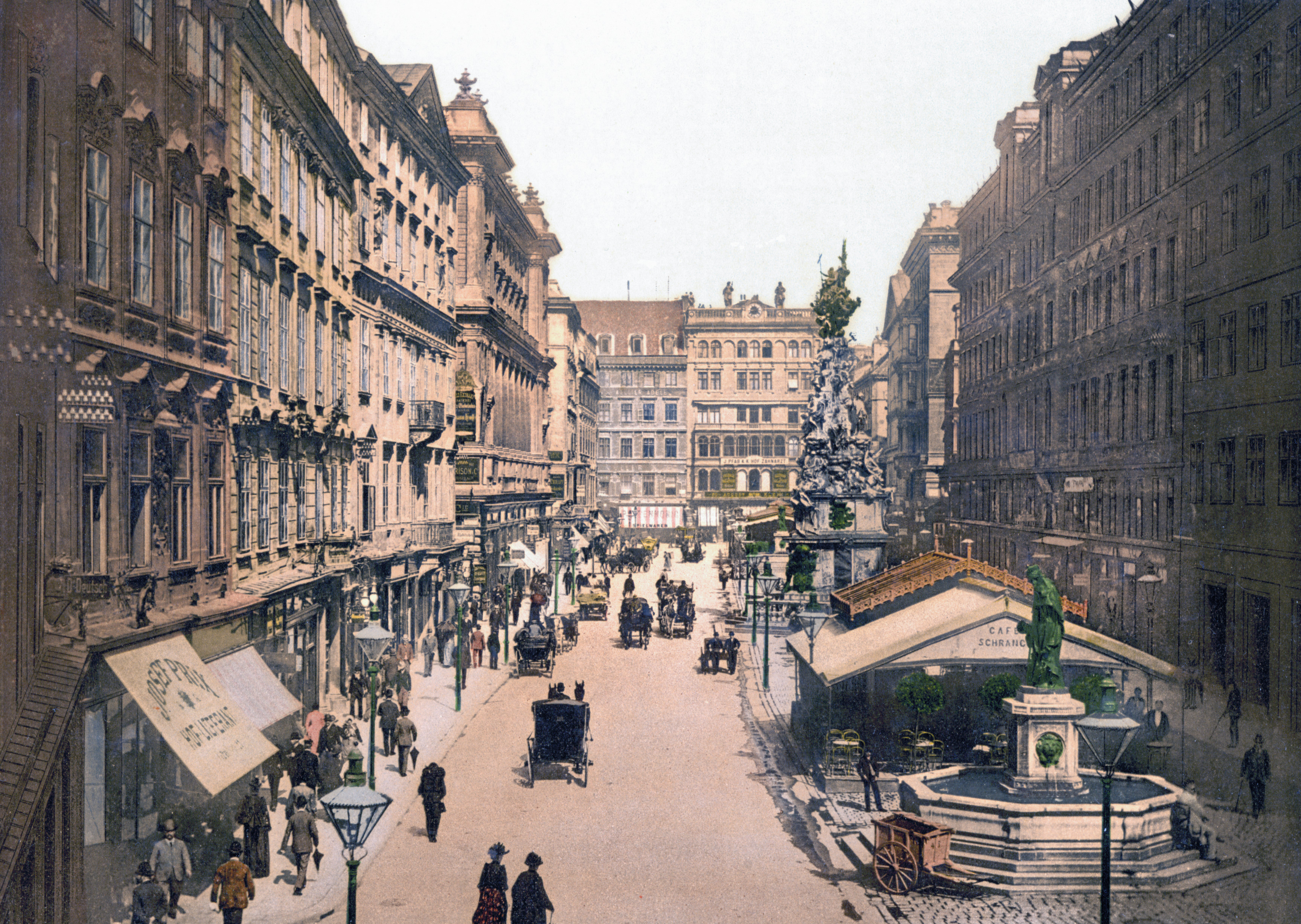
The Graben towards the northwest, c. 1900

The Graben traces its origin back to the old Roman encampment of Vindobona. The south-western wall of the settlement extended along the length of the present-day Graben and Naglergasse; before the wall lay a trench (Graben). This trench still stood in front of the medieval city walls. At the end of the 12th century, the city was enlarged by the Babenberg Dukes, who also filled in and leveled the trench. This was funded by the ransom money collected from Richard the Lionheart. The Graben thereby became one of the first residential streets in the new section of the city. In this area of the city, large unbuilt areas were still available, which probably contributed to the maintenance of the name "Graben" up until the present day.

=== Middle Ages ===
The planned character of the city extension is still visible in the differing characters of the building patterns to the north and to the south of the Graben. The building pattern on the north side (that of the old city) has remained irregular to this day, and only one, narrow side-street opens off the Graben to the north: the Jungferngässchen, which gives access to the Peterskirche. On the other hand, five regular side-streets were constructed to the south of the Graben in the 13th century: the Obere Bräunerstraße (today known as Habsburgergasse), the Untere Bräunerstraße (Bräunerstraße), the Färberstraße (Dorotheergasse), the Laderstraße (Spiegelgasse), and the Reifstraße (Seilergasse). Although at first these side-streets remained relatively underbuilt, the situation rapidly changed.

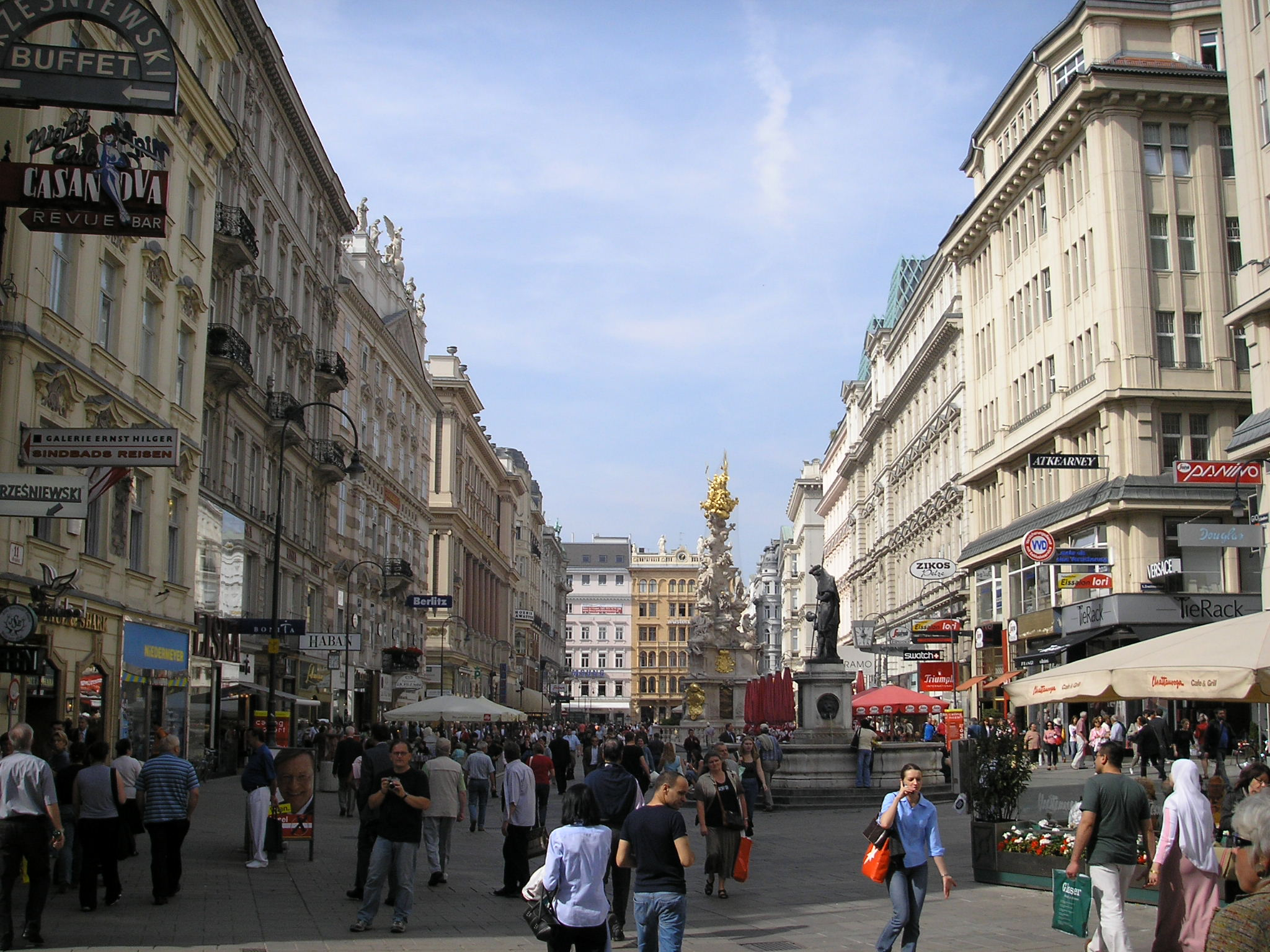
The Graben towards the northwest today

According to the historian Karl Oettinger, the Graben replaced the Hoher Markt and Wipplingerstraße as Vienna's main arterial road. The new route supposedly led from Am Hof over Bognergasse and the Graben to Stock-im-Eisen-Platz, at that point turning in the direction of St. Stephen's Cathedral, then passing over Rotenturmstraße to reach the Wollzeile. Traffic would therefore no longer have needed to pass through the main market at Hoher Markt. However, as there was little reason at the time to travel in the direction of the Schottentor, this theory has been disputed.

At that time the Graben was lined primarily with wooden houses, which led to a catastrophe on March 23, 1327. A fire broke out in the Wallnerstraße house of a priest of St. Stephen's, Heinrich von Luzern, and quickly spread over Kohlmarkt to the Graben, destroying the area completely. King Frederick the Handsome participated in the rescue effort. At that time the Graben had not yet become a preferred residence for the nobility; its seems that its residents were primarily Swabians, who had come to Vienna in the time of Rudolph I. The only building known from this time is the Freisingerhof (see below).

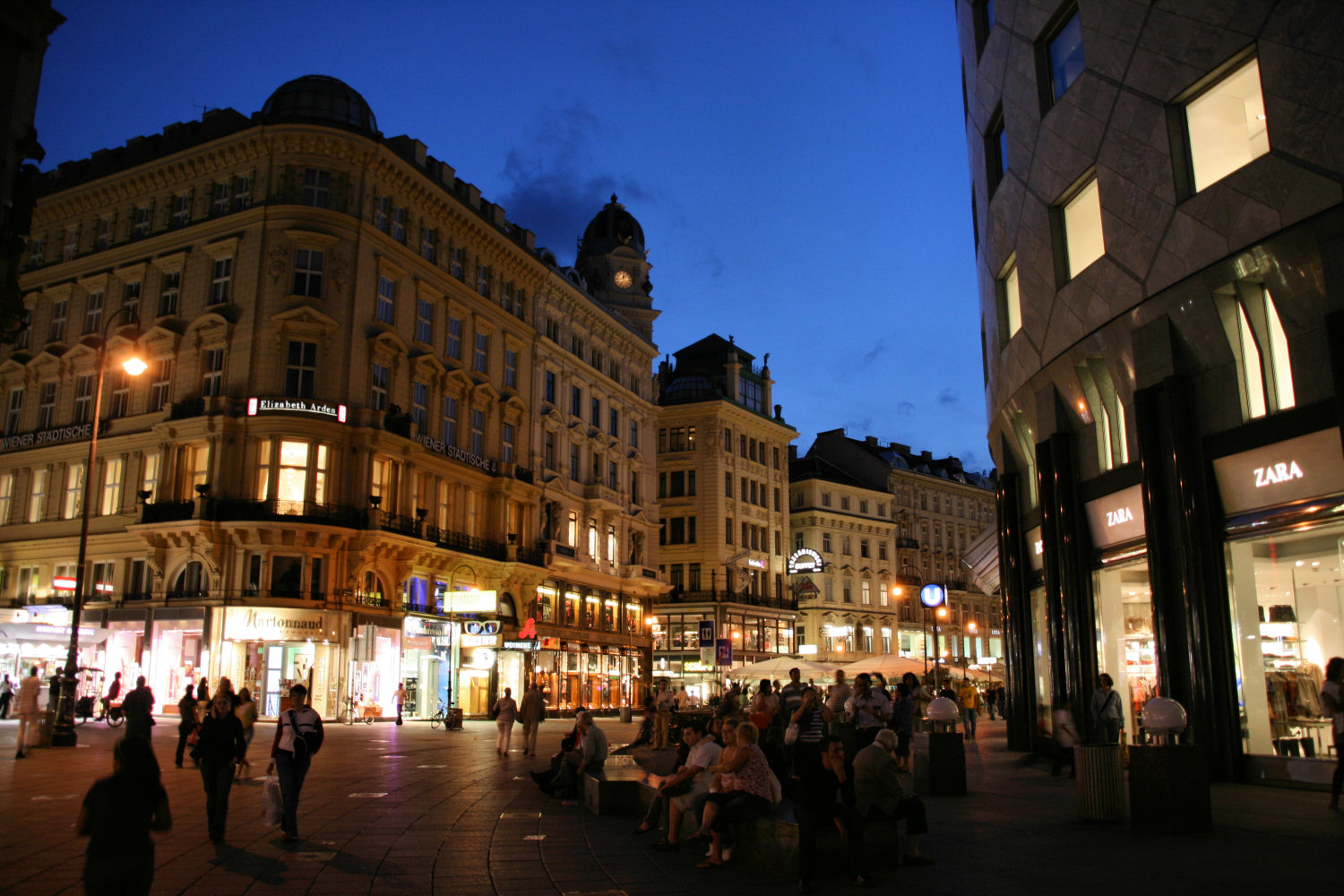
Where Stephansplatz meets Graben

At the turn of the 14th century, houses were built at both ends of the Graben. This activity led to the construction of the Paternostergässchen, an extension of the Naglergasse, at the northwestern end, and at the southwestern end of the Grabengasse and the infamously narrow Schlossergässchen, where the metal-workers (Schlosser) built their workshops. Other craftsmen, including blacksmiths, were found at this spot. The narrowness of the Schlossergässchen was a source of constant criticism as an obstruction to the flow of traffic. On account of these new constructions, the Graben came to be seen more as a piazza than as a street. It was however not yet an exclusive address, particularly as the so-called Mörung originated there. This was a stream used for sewage disposal, and gave rise to a corresponding stench. Over time, however, various local dignitaries took up residence on the Graben, at first primarily the wealthy bourgeoisie.

=== Baroque Era ===
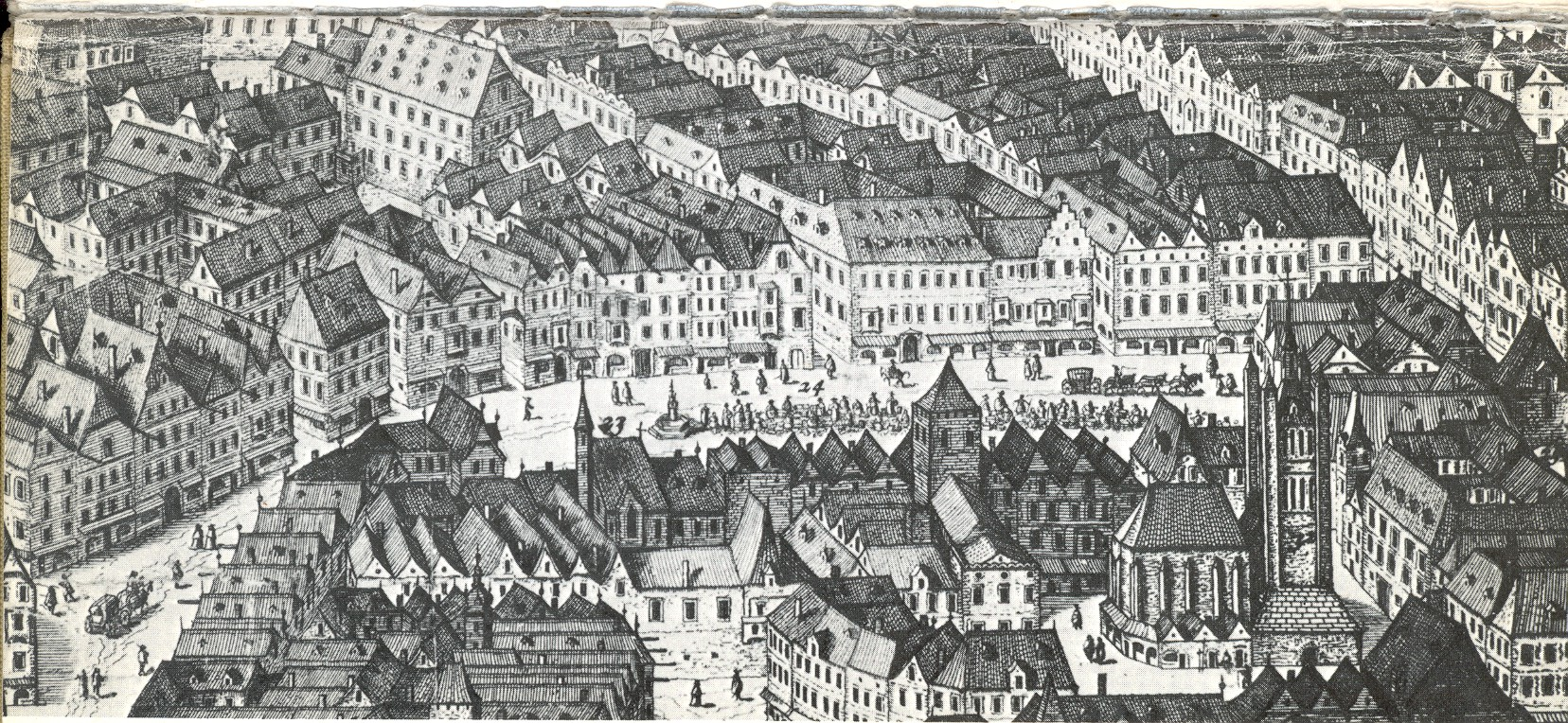
View of the Graben before 1609 by Jacob Hoefnagel

Although the form of the Graben remained more or less the same, its character began to change. It was marked above all by the construction of the Arkadenhof, a striking Renaissance building, which in 1873 was replaced by the present-day Grabenhof. The Graben became the site of various festivities, including public displays of homage to the ruling house. This prompted the residents to rebuild their houses and to deck out their facades. In 1701 the old Peterskirche was torn down, and the new structure was completed in 1708.

In the course of the 18th century the use of the Graben as a market was suppressed. In 1753 the produce-sellers were removed, and in 1772 the Christmas market was relocated. The Graben became the most fashionable promenade, the chief arena for the self-display of the urban elite. This was not limited to the nobility, but included the entrepreneurial class as well, who were most visibly represented by the construction of the Trattnerhof by the printer Thomas von Trattner. Prostitutes were also in evidence — the famous Grabennymphen.

=== Regularization ===
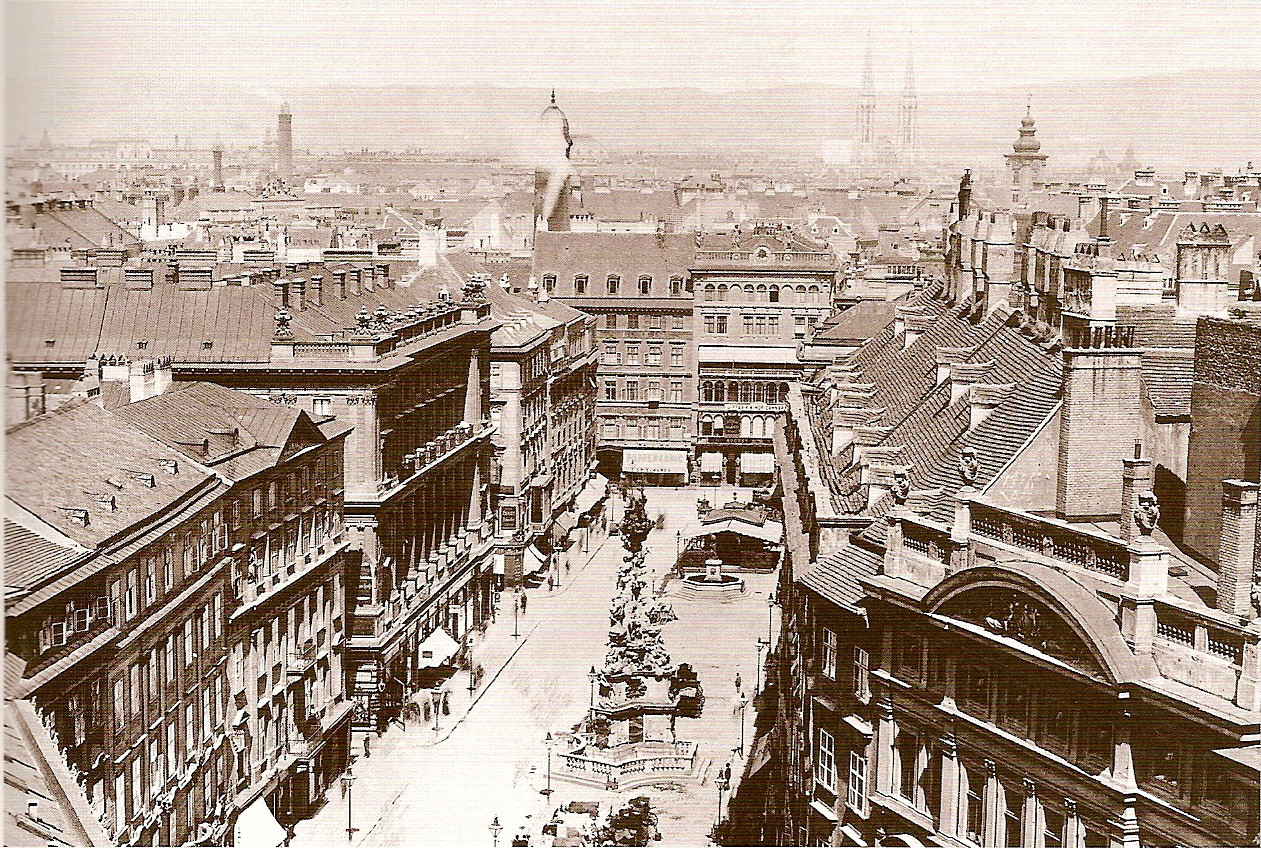
View of the Graben, already regularized, ca. 1890.

The ascendancy of the Graben resumed at the start of the 19th century. It became the site of ever more luxury shops, marked by artistically significant signs. On account of this growth in business, and the corresponding increase in traffic, the housing blocks on either side of the Graben were increasingly seen as obstructions. In 1835 the Erste österreichische Spar-Casse had the corner houses on Tuchlauben torn down and erected its headquarters, which stand to this day, in their stead. In 1840 the buildings on the northwestern end of the Graben followed in their wake. Between 1860 and 1866 the houses between Grabengasse and Schlossergassl were removed, with the result that the Graben led directly to Stock-im-Eisen-Platz, and became once more a proper street. In fact, nearly all the houses on the Graben disappeared, with the exception of the Palais Bartolotti-Partenfeld. The Jungferngässchen was widened, and an open passage to the Peterskirche was created. Even the Trattnerhof was replaced by two new buildings in 1911, between which a second passage to the old city was opened.

=== 20th century ===
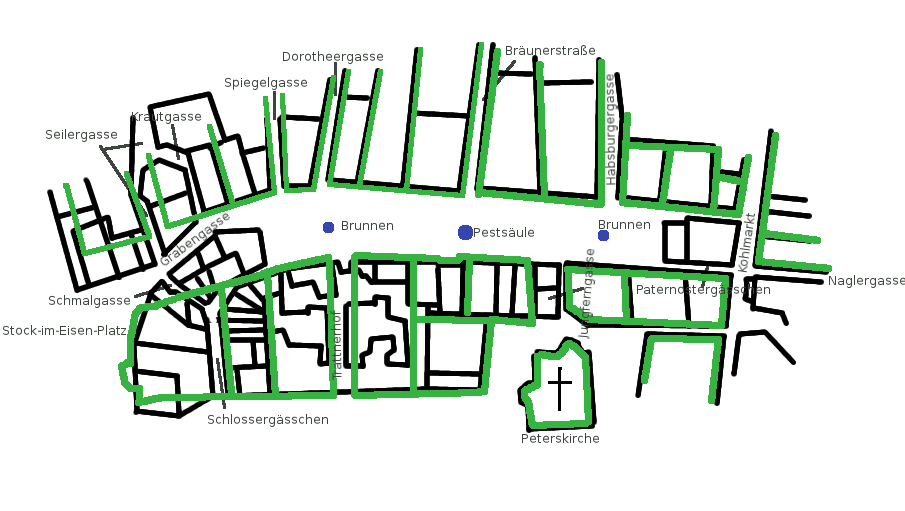
The Graben before the regularization (black) and today (green)

With the increase in car traffic, the Graben also became a heavily traveled street. However, traffic was limited, as previously, to the southern half of the street. On December 4, 1950, the first neon lights in Vienna were installed here.

Numerous plans for the development of the Graben were proposed, including two for its surveillance. On November 22, 1974, the Graben became, on a provisional basis, Vienna's first pedestrian zone. In the course of the construction of the U-Bahn, the Graben was rebuilt in successive phases, and the pedestrian zone was gradually expanded. In this connection, development proposals from five architects and architectural firms were commissioned. The proposal of Gruppe M for the roofing of the Graben was hotly debated.

Today the Graben is again one of the most important promenades and shopping streets in Vienna.

== Graben as a marketplace ==
The Graben has served as a marketplace from the very beginning. Already in 1295, shortly after the Graben was first named in documents, a fruit dealer was mentioned. The selling of cabbage began around 1320, and other vegetables were introduced around a hundred years later. These products lent the Graben the additional names of Grüner Markt and Kräutermarkt. Beginning in the 14th century, flour and bread sellers are also mentioned. In 1442 the bakers were granted permission to sell their own wares. The so-called Brotbänke, which the bakers were required to rent, originated on the Graben. The Paternostergässchen was occupied by the Paternosterer, makers of rosaries. Beginning in 1424, butchers are also mentioned in treasury documents, which strictly regulate their opening hours. According to a decree issued in 1564 by Ferdinand I, the butchers were to be moved on account of their offensive smell, but the law did not meet with full compliance. In the 18th century the commercial activity was pushed increasingly into the outlying buildings, and in 1753 the last-remaining market (the vegetable market) was shut down.

== Graben as a festival site ==
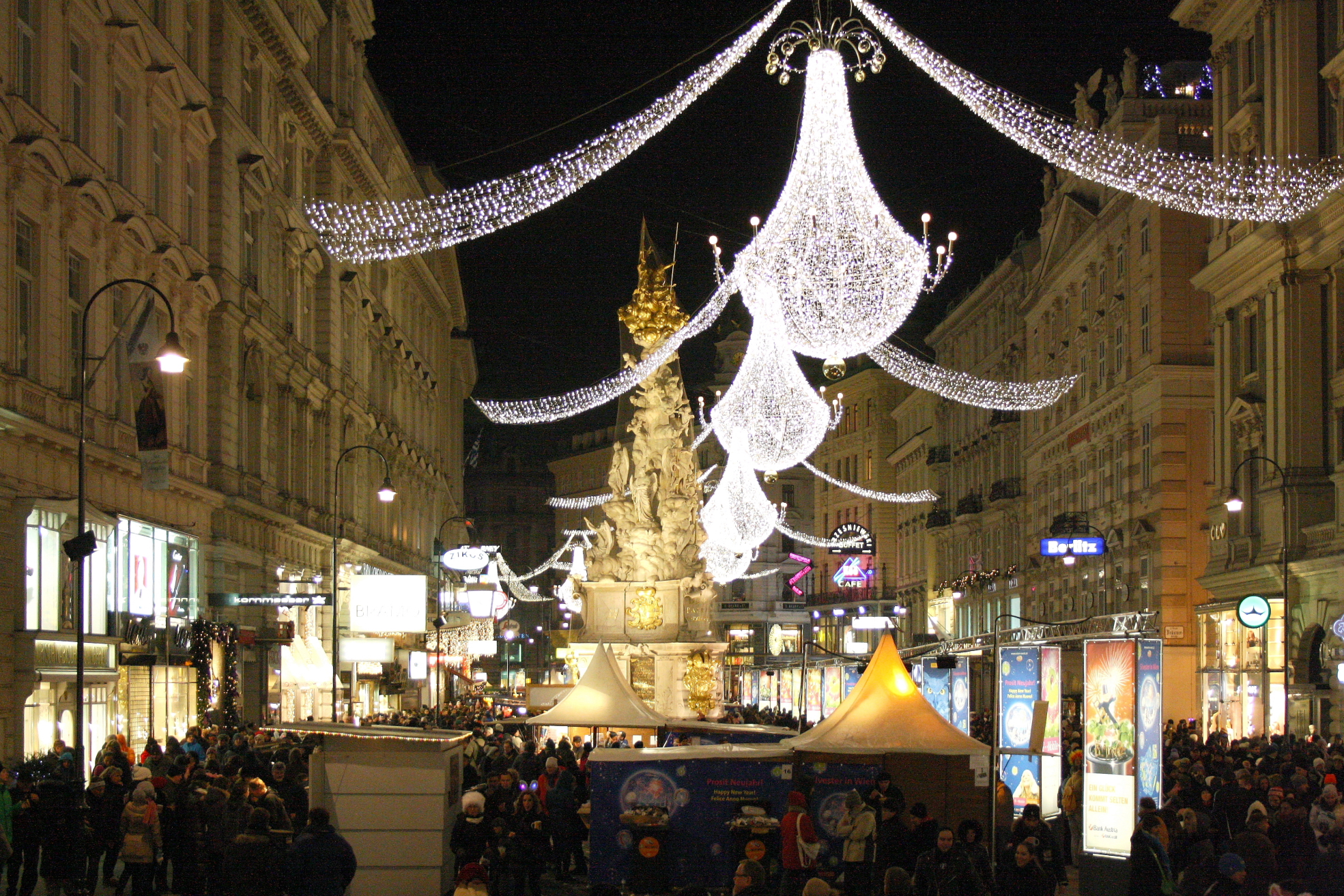
The Graben during Advent

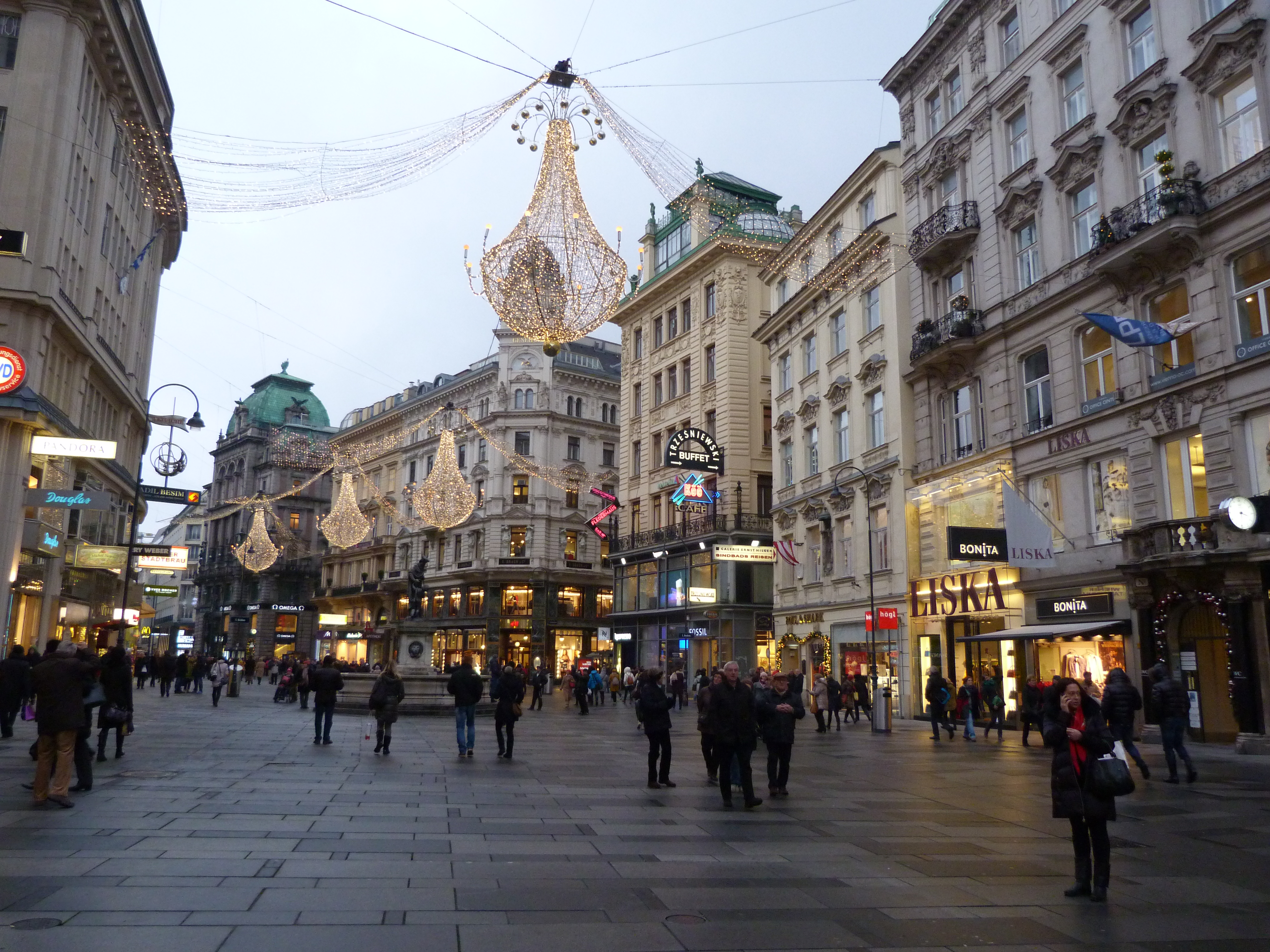
Advent - 2014

On account of its location and size the Graben was particularly suitable for festival processions. Fronleichnamsprozessionen (processions on the occasion of the Feast of Corpus Christi) are first mentioned in 1438, but probably took place even earlier. With the arrival of Protestantism, these processions played a particularly important role in the demonstration of Catholic faith. During the era of Emperor Charles VI, daily masses were held at the Pestsäule. In the 18th century processions took place nearly every week, but this was curtailed by Empress Maria Theresa. Finally, Emperor Joseph II forbade all processions save the Corpus Christi.

The Graben also served as a site for triumphal processions, in particular for the arrival of Archdukes and Emperors. It is known to have also been the site of the public displays of homage, at which the notables demonstrated their reverence for the rulers. Such displays are first mentioned in 1620, in the era of Emperor Ferdinand II.

== Buildings ==
=== Freisingerhof and Trattnerhof ===
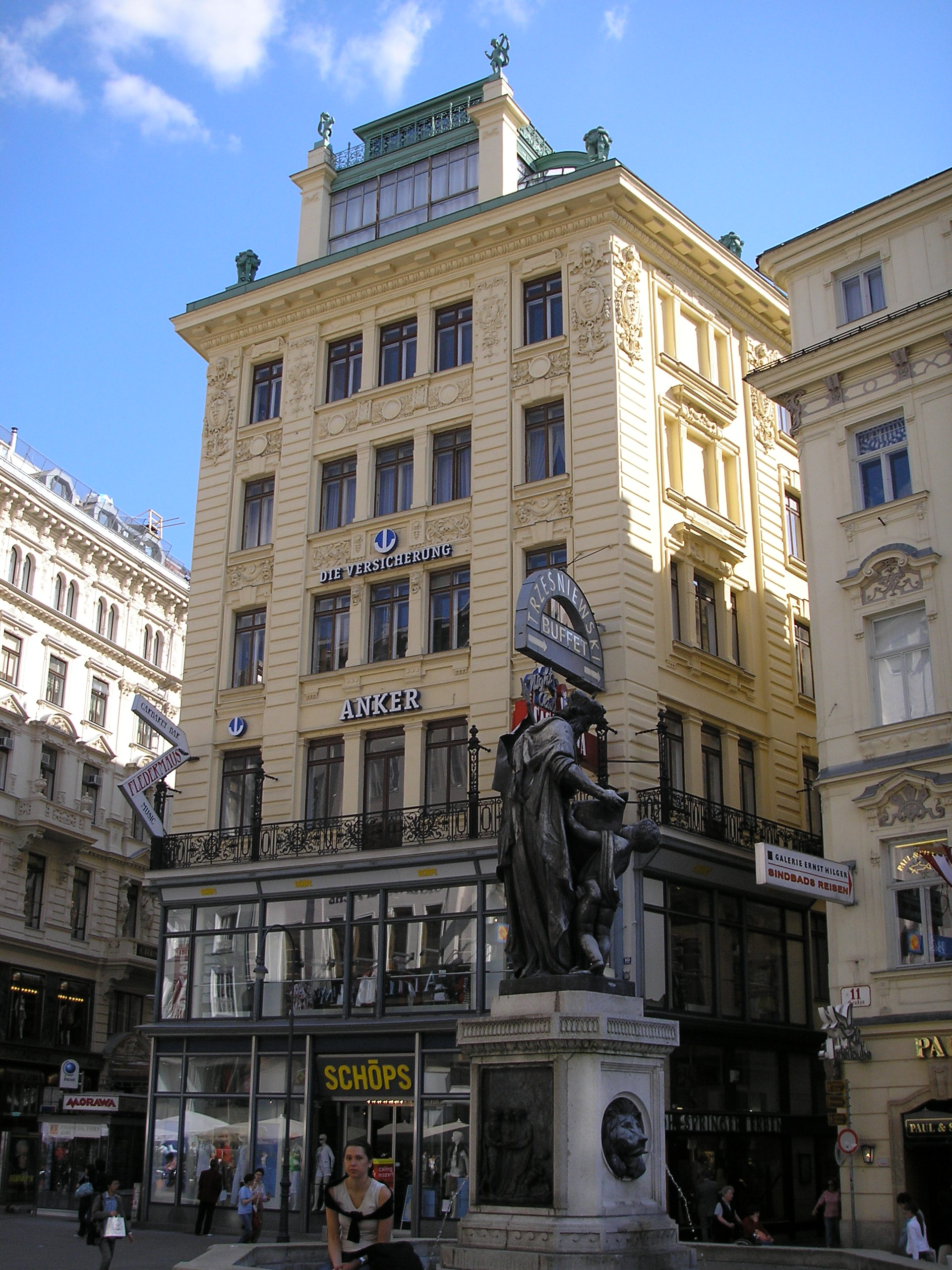
Anker-Haus, by Otto Wagner

The Freisingerhof was the first monumental building on the Graben. The See of Freising owned a plot here on which they built a Hof (court), presumably at the end of the 12th century, although it is first mentioned in 1273. The irregular Romanesque building served on the one hand as an administrative center for the see's estates in the area of Vienna, and on the other hand as accommodation for the bishops of Freising and their diplomatic representatives. It was originally known as the Dompropsthof; the first document designating it as the Freisingerhof dates to the year 1468. Besides the main building, the Hof included other surrounding houses.

Johann Thomas Trattner purchased the Hof in 1773, and commissioned a new residence from Peter Mollner. The structure, which was completed in 1776, was enormous for its time. Opinions regarding the building were divided. While its sheer size was impressive, its numerous small rooms and vaults were criticized. The building was officially named the Trattnernhof, as befits the noble title "von Trattner," but the name Trattnerhof prevailed in common practice. The entrance portals were decorated with caryatids by Tobias Kögler. The house remained in the possession of the Trattner family until the beginning of the 19th century. In 1911 it was replaced by two office buildings, built by Rudolf Krauß and Felix Sauer, which were separated by a narrow alley, which provided for the first time a second passage into the old city. The alley still bears the name Trattnerhof.

=== Ankerhaus ===
This residential building was erected between 1894 and 1895 by Otto Wagner, presumably for himself. Its name owes to the fact that the previous building had been purchased by the eponymous insurance firm Der Anker. The style of the lower story's large glass surfaces was avant-garde in relation to later construction techniques with reinforced concrete. Beginning in 1971, the building was used by Friedensreich Hundertwasser.

=== Palais Bartolotti-Partenfeld ===
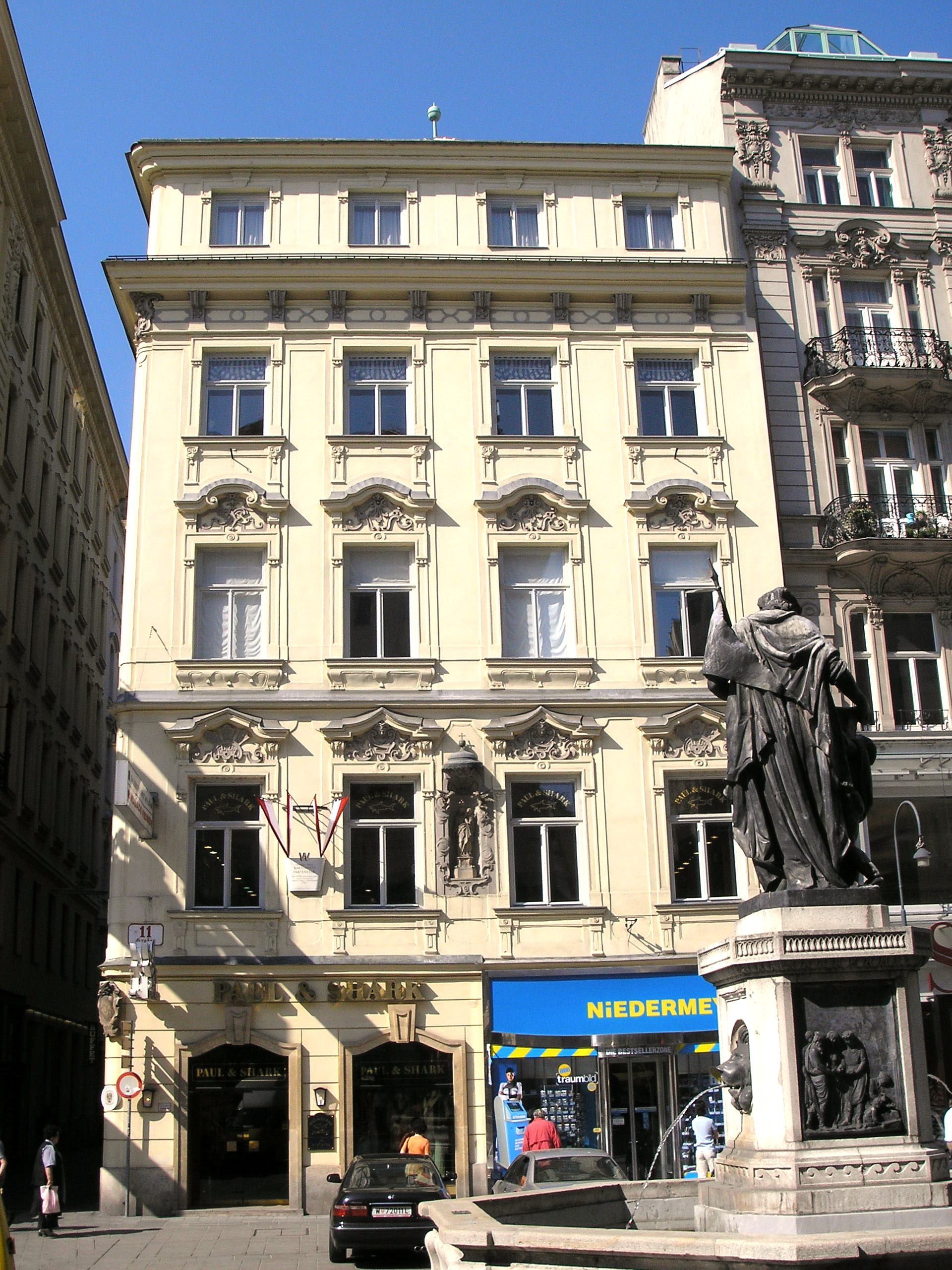
Palais Bartolotti-Partenfeld

The palace of the Barons Bartolotti von Partenfeld is the only baroque structure on the Graben that has survived to this day.

=== Generalihof ===
This building, first erected between 1794 and 1795 by Peter Mollner and Ernest Koch, was rebuilt in 1831 by Josef Klee. This was the site of Leopold Kozeluch's music shop. In 1894 the Assicurazione Generali acquired the house, renovating the facade and adding a penthouse. Knize, a prominent tailor, occupied the ground floor; its showroom was built by Adolf Loos.

=== Grabenhof ===
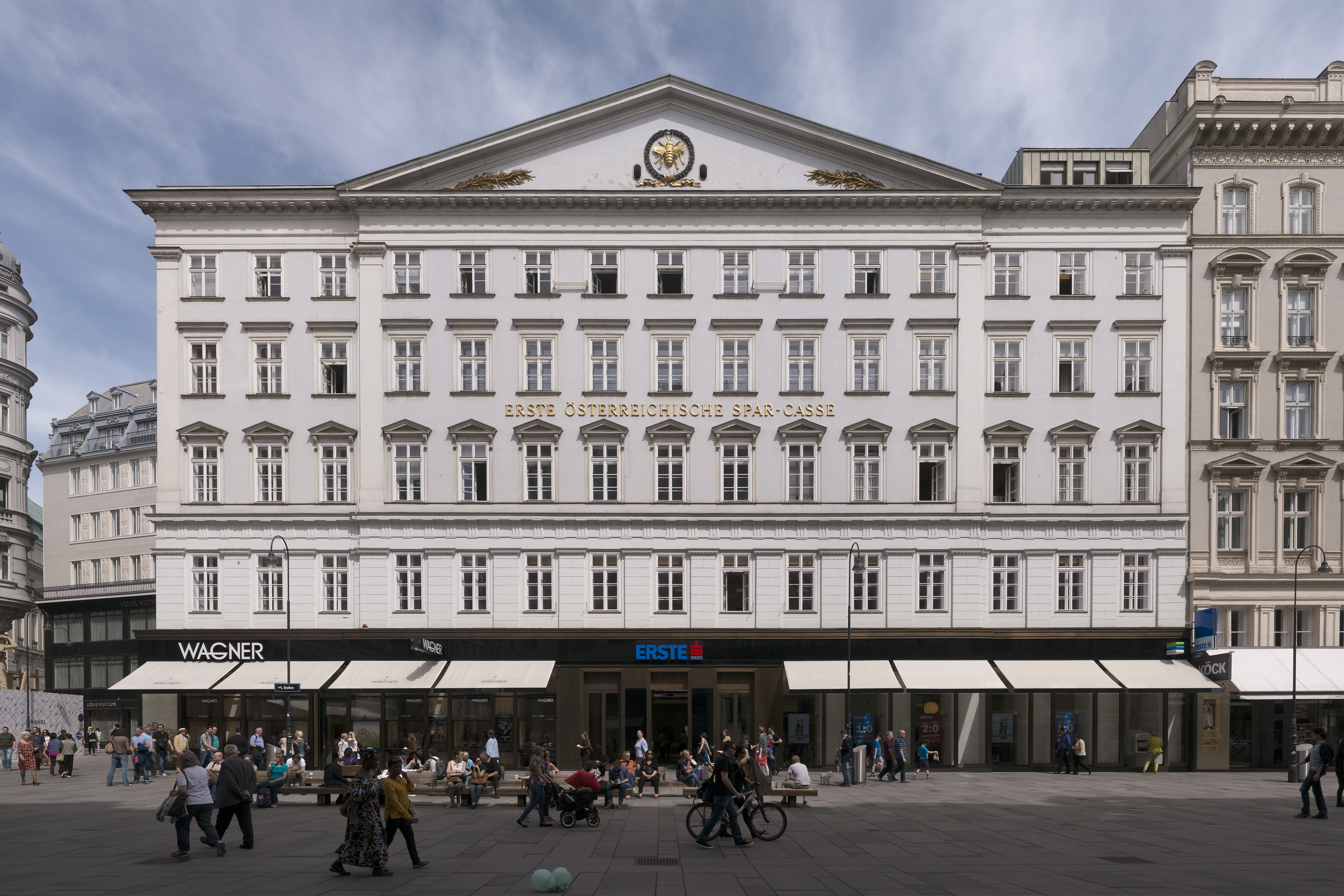
Erste österreichische Spar-Casse

The Grabenhof, also known as the Thienemannhof, is a historicizing work built between 1873 and 1874 by Otto Thienemann and Otto Wagner on the site of the old Arkadenhof. The roof was rebuilt in 1947 by Alfons Hetmanek. It is today owned by the Österreichische Beamtenversicherung, and has been used since 1991 as a site for cultural events.

On June 18, 1994, a memorial plaque for Josef Sonnleithner, who lived in the Arkadenhof until 1874, was erected. Sonnleithner was the founder of the "Gesellschaft der Musikfreunde in Wien" (Society of the Friends of Music in Vienna).

=== Erste österreichische Spar-Kasse ===
The expansion of the Erste österreichische Sparkasse gave rise to numerous changes of headquarters in its early years. In 1825 the bank moved into the house at Graben 21. It soon purchased three neighboring houses, which were torn down, and between 1835 and 1839 the architect Alois Pichl constructed the new headquarters.

== Other structures ==
=== Pestsäule ===
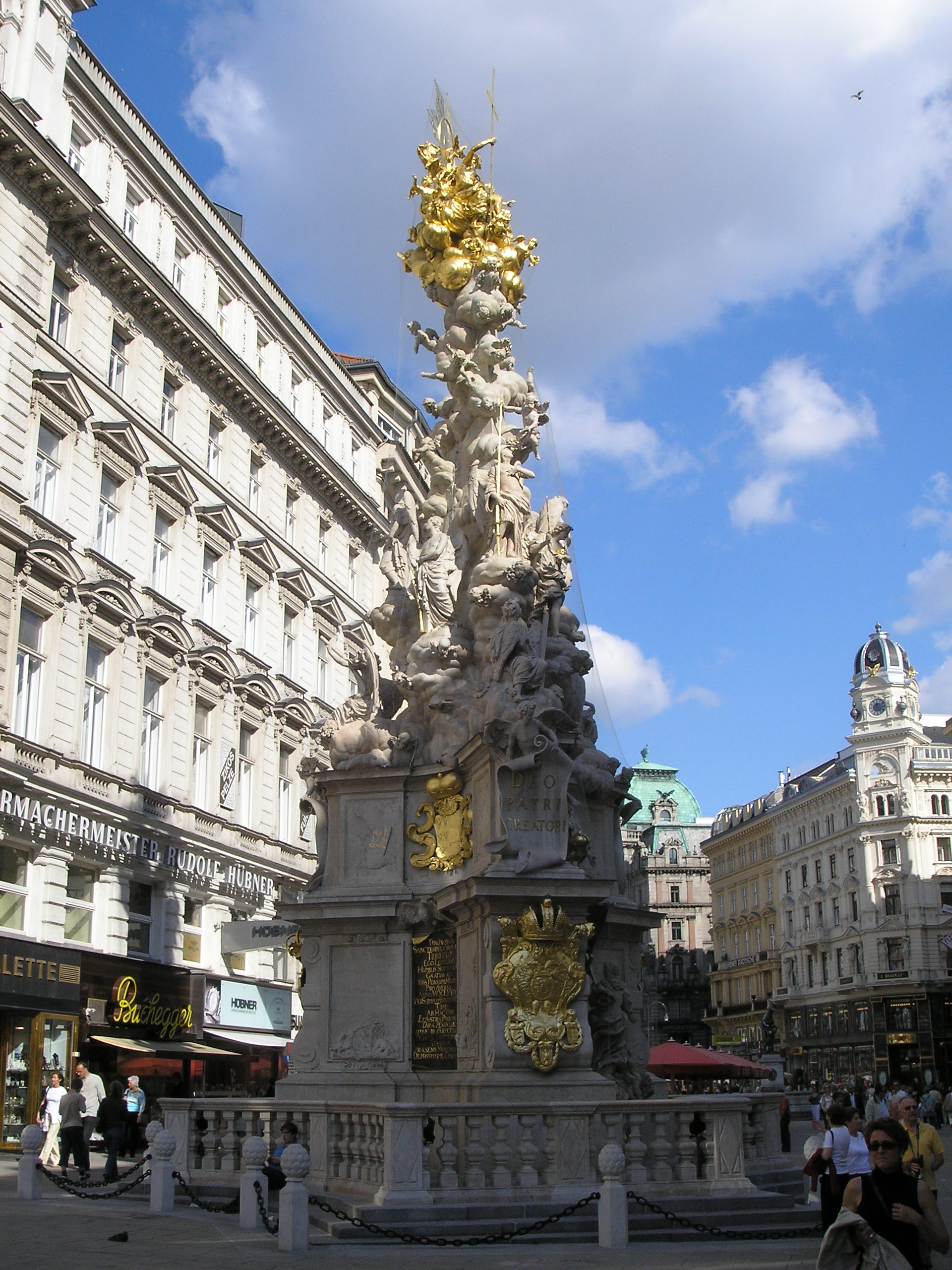
Pestsäule in Vienna

The Pestsäule was constructed by Emperor Leopold I following the Great Plague of Vienna.

=== Fountains ===
Two fountains are found on the Graben. Already in 1455, expenditures for a fountain are found in the city account books. This fountain stood on the northwestern end of the Graben and served primarily to put out fires. As it was decorated with four lion's heads, it was known as the Löwenbrunnen (lion fountain). The second, southwestern, fountain was presumably built in 1561. When in 1638 it was decided to establish new fire regulations, new fountains on the Freyung and the Graben were likewise deemed necessary. The two fountains were therefore rebuilt. At the behest of Leopold I, the fountains were adorned with sculptures of Saints Joseph and Leopold, which were executed by the sculptor Johann Frühwirth. These were later replaced with lead figures by Johann Martin Fischer. Frühwirth's statues have since been lost.

== Traffic ==
It is unclear to what degree the Graben served as an arterial road in the Middle Ages (see above), as the construction of buildings at either end eventually rendered it unsuitable for such a function. However, after its regularization in the 19th century, it became one of the most heavily traveled streets in Vienna even before the arrival of cars. Traffic was always permitted only on the southwestern end. Already, in the 19th century, numerous coaches-for-hire were found on the Graben.

Beginning on March 1, 1912, the first bus-line in the city ran from Stephansplatz via the Graben to the Volksoper. Later, numerous bus-lines would travel the Graben. In connection with the construction of the U-Bahn, the Graben became a pedestrian zone. A test-run of the pedestrian zone was inaugurated at the Christmas parade on November 27, 1971. The final project for the establishment of the pedestrian zone was the work of Hermann Stiegholzer, and was inaugurated in 1978. The project was completed in 1988 with the incorporation of the stretch between Peterskirche and the Kohlmarkt.

The U-Bahn Line U3 has run under the portion between Stock-im-Eisen-Platz and Jungferngasse since 1991. Stephansplatz Station had already been built as a shell during the original construction of the U-1, rendering its extension under the Graben necessary. An exit from this station leads up to the Graben. This is unroofed, in an attempt to render it as unobtrusive as possible, as incorporation of the exit into the neighboring buildings was not possible on account of the high compensatory payments that would have been necessary.

== Sources ==
The entry is substantially based upon the equivalent article in the German Wikipedia.

- Felix Czeike: Der Graben, Paul Zsolnay Verlag, Wien-Hamburg 1972
- Dehio-Handbuch Wien I. Bezirk - Innere Stadt, Verlag Berger, Horn/Wien 2003, ISBN 3-85028-366-6
- Ernst Kurz: Die städtebauliche Entwicklung der Stadt Wien in Beziehung zum Verkehr, Magistrat der Stadt Wien (MA18), Wien 1981
- Harald Marincig: 80 Jahre Autobusbetrieb der Gemeinde Wien 1907 - 1987, Wiener Stadtwerke-Verkehrsbetriebe, Wien 1987
- Rudolf Gerlich, R. Andraschko: Stadt für Fußgänger - Gestaltung öffentlicher Räume in Wien - Ausgewählte Beispiele, Compress Verlag, Wien 1985
- Manfred Koller und Rainer Prandtstetten: Restauratorenblätter Band 6 zum Thema Die Wiener Pestsäule, November 1982. Österreichische Sektion des International Institute for Conservation (IIC)
