= Kärntner Straße =

Shopping street in Vienna, Austria

Coordinates: 48.206°N 16.371°E

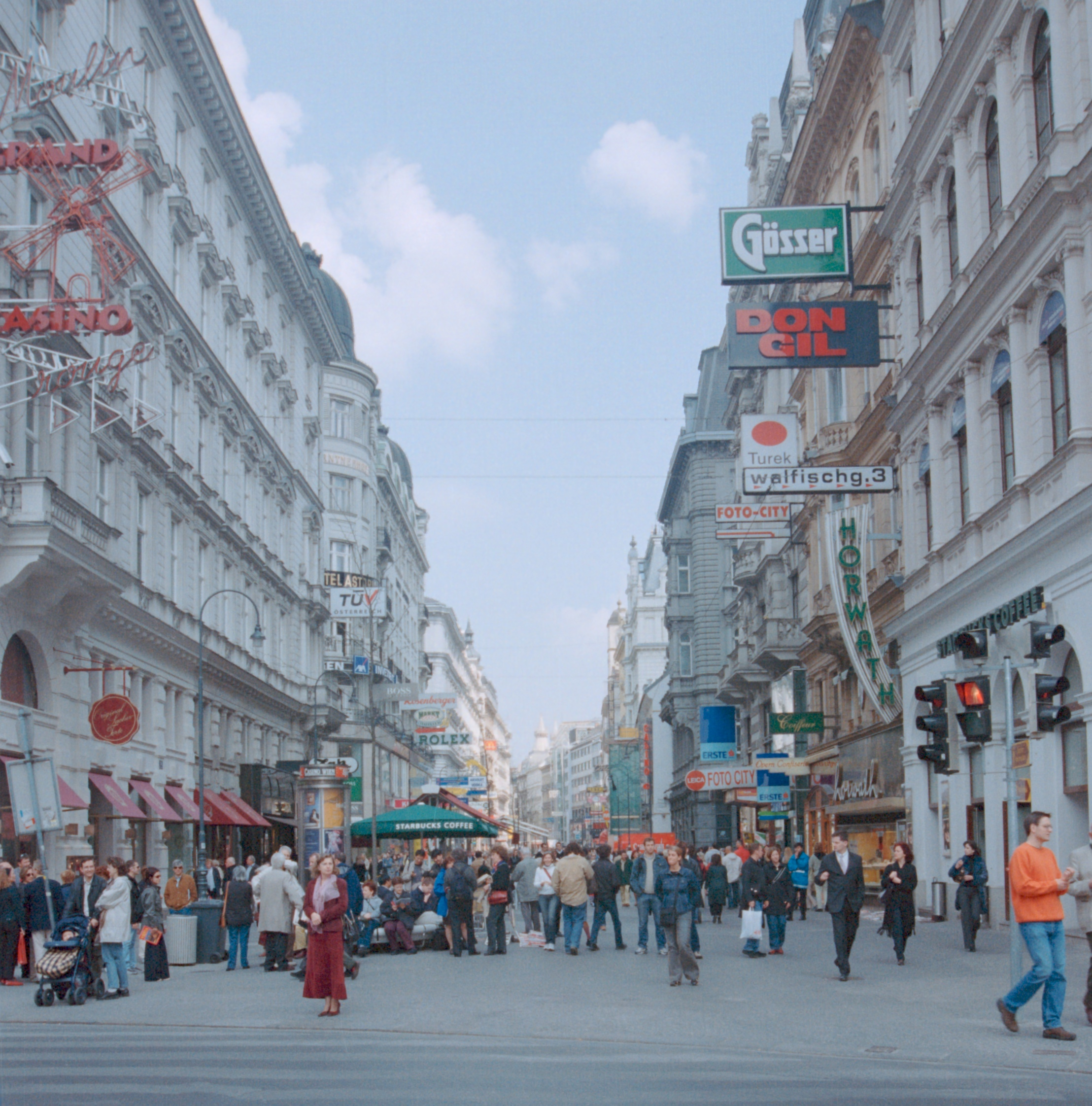
Kärntner Straße facing north

The Kärntner Straße (English: Carinthian Street) is one of the most famous streets in the center of Vienna. It begins near the Vienna Ring Road on Karlsplatz, leading past the Vienna State Opera and north to Stephansplatz in the center of Vienna. At Stephansplatz, the Kärnter Straße meets the Graben. Together with the Graben and Kohlmarkt, the Kärntner Straße forms Vienna's so-called "Golden U" of inner-city shopping streets, which offer upscale stores and are pedestrian zones.

== History ==
The Kärntner Straße already existed in Vienna during the city's time as a Roman settlement. In 1257, the street was first mentioned in an official document as Strata Carinthianorum and connected the city center with the city wall's Carinthian Gate, which stood near today's Vienna State Opera. Its extension was an important connection to port cities such as Venice and Trieste, and the street itself was an important commercial location. The name of the street refers to the southern Austrian state of Carinthia, which lies in the direction of the aforementioned port cities. It has been referred to using slightly different names and spellings throughout the centuries, among them Cärnerstrass/Khärnerstrass (1563/66), Kahrnerstrass (1587), and Karnerstrasse (1749).

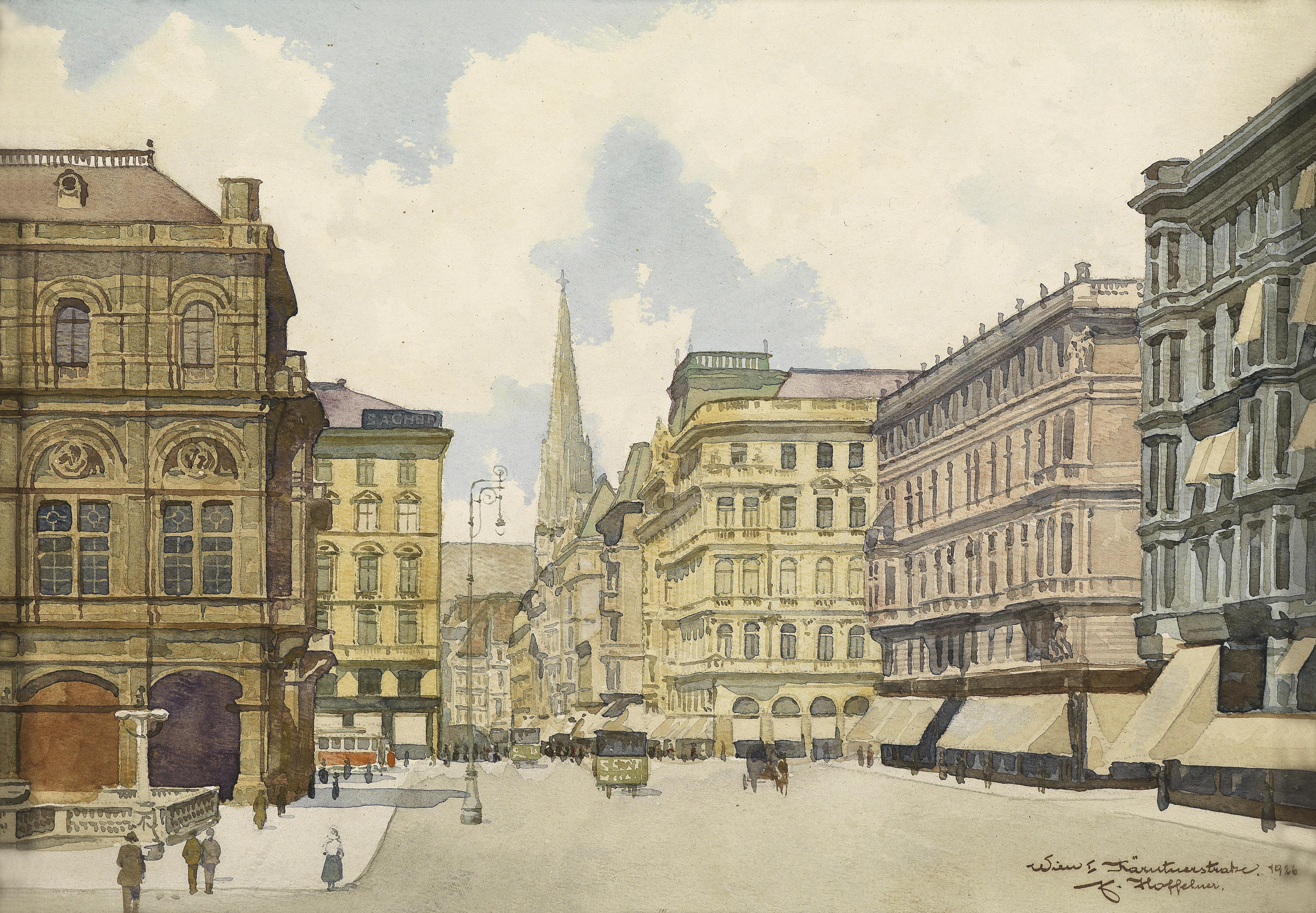
Kärntner Straße in 1926 by Franz Hoffelner

During the 19th century, the Kärnter Straße was widened from 9 to 17 meters, which resulted in many new historicist buildings being erected, among them several palaces (many of which have endured until the present day). After the old city walls were demolished to be replaced by the Vienna Ring Road, the Kärntner Straße was lengthened, now leading south to Karlsplatz (which had been oustside the city walls) instead of stopping at the city gate. Representative department stores and an arcaded shopping gallery (later demolished) were built on the street. The Kärntner Straße experienced an economic golden age, hosting several distinguished stores and hotels and being one of the Viennese high society's favored places.

During the Second World War, the Kärntner Straße was severely damaged, being one of the hardest-hit locations in the city center. This subsequently led to numerous reconstructions and new buildings being erected after the war. These buildings oftentimes did not abide by the previous historicist style, instead opting for a spartan look.

During the building of the Vienna U-Bahn in 1974, the Kärntner Strasse was redesigned as a pedestrian zone. Today, the street is one of the city's major shopping streets, being home to several upscale hotels, stores, and coffee houses and serving as a major tourism hotspot.

== Main sights ==
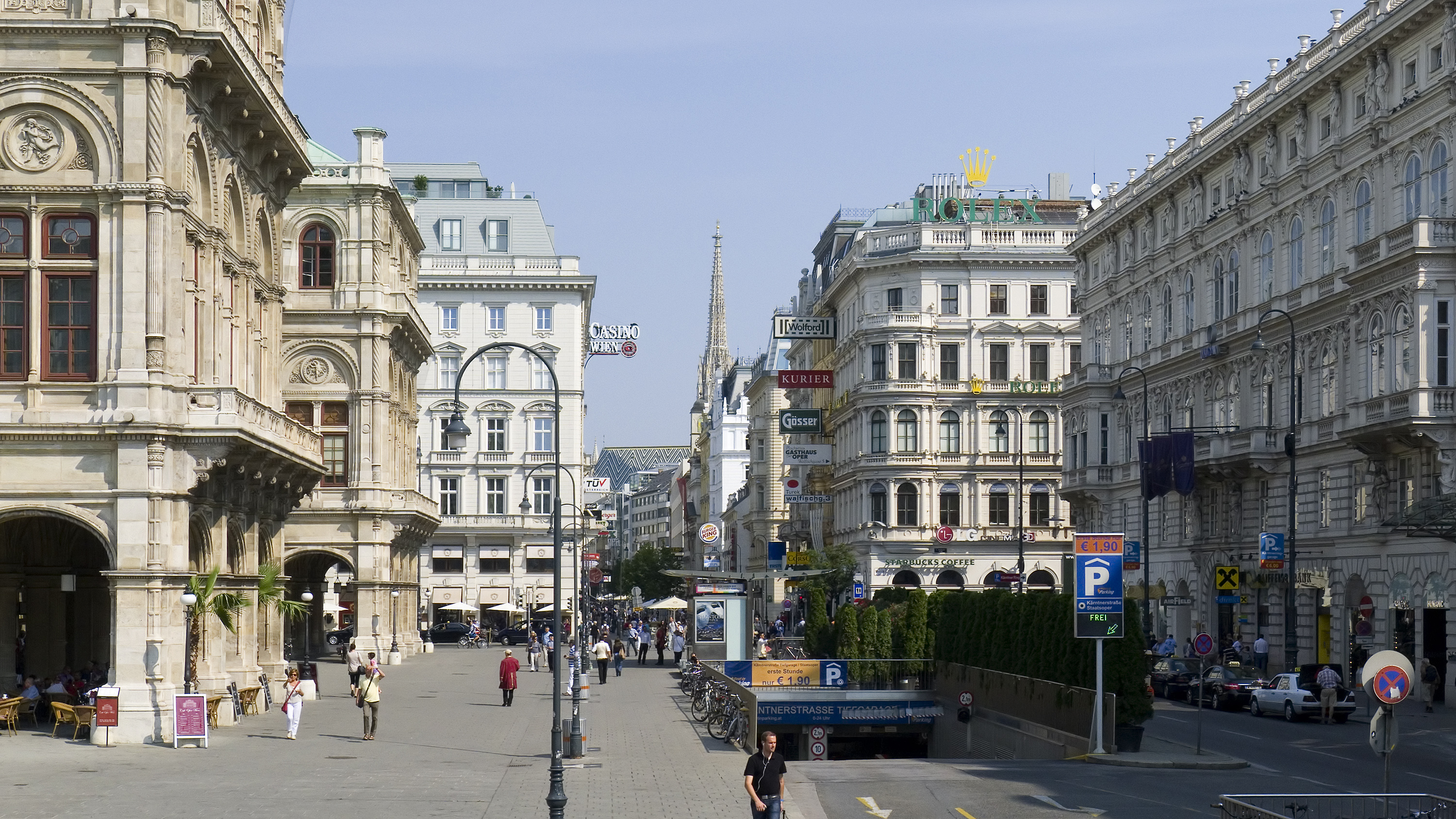
Kärntner Straße with the Vienna State Opera on the far left and the Palais Todesco on the far right

- Vienna State Opera (one of the world's most renowned opera houses in a Neo-Renaissance building)
- Maltese Church (originally gothic church with a later added Neo-classical façade)
- Palais Todesco (Neo-Renaissance palace built for the noble banking family Todesco)
- Palais Equitable (built to house a branch of the Equitable Life Assurance Society of the United States, featuring a richly decorated façade including American eagle ornaments)
- Palais Esterházy (17th-century baroque palace built for the Esterházy noble family)
- Hotel Sacher (renowned hotel and coffee house, origin of the Sachertorte)
- Conditorei Sluka (renowned pastry shop and coffee house, former supplier to the royal court)
- Café Gerstner (renowned pastry shop and coffee house in the Palais Todesco, former supplier to the royal court)
- J. & L. Lobmeyr (renowned glassblower, former supplier to the royal court)
- Steffl (renowned department store)

== Sources ==
- Felix Czeike: Die Kärntner Straße. Wiener Geschichtsbücher Band 16, Paul Zsolnay Verlag, Wien 1975.
- Reinhard Engel: Luxus aus Wien I. Czernin Verlag, Wien 2001, ISBN 3-7076-0121-8.
