= Steffl (department store) =

Department store in Vienna, Austria

Coordinates: 48.2064°N 16.3717°E

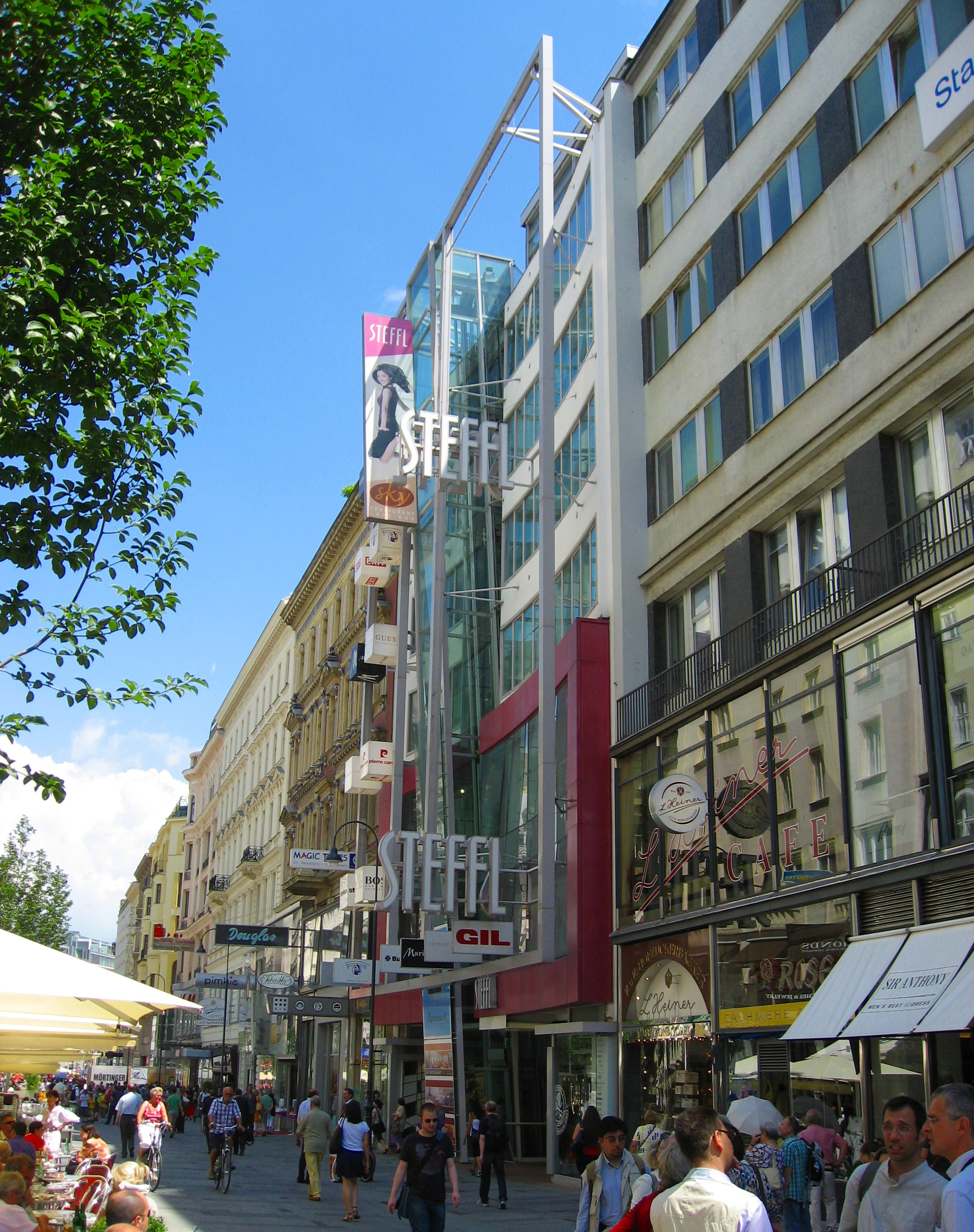
Department Store Steffl

Steffl Department Store, commonly referred to as Steffl, is a department store located on Kärntner Strasse in Innere Stadt, Vienna, Austria. It is named after the nearby Stephansdom, which is sometimes known as "Steffl".

== History ==
The M. Neumann Department Store, designed by Otto Wagner and built in 1895-1896, previously stood on the site of the current store. On 11–12 April 1945, the store caught fire during the Vienna Offensive and was demolished in 1949 due to war-time damage.

In 1949-50, Carl Appel built a new, nine-storey (from -1 to +7) development for the Neumann company, which has been known as the Steffl Department Store since 1961. Kärntner Strasse had not yet been pedestrianized at that time.

On 1 May 1979, a fire was detected in the women's clothing department on the second floor and 900 m² of retail space went up in flames. The smell of burning was again detected during the clean-up process and police discovered an incendiary device with a time fuse. The following day, two other incendiary devices were discovered in a neighbouring department store. The "Erster Mai" (First of May) organisation described the attacks as protests against capitalism.

The ownership structure of the store has changed several times in recent decades. The Konsum Österreich consumer cooperative indirectly became one of the temporary owners but shrank from a large company to a small business in 1995 due to a sensational collapse of their accounts.

The store was completely renovated in the 1990s. In 2007, the businessman Hans Schmid acquired the property and the operating company. Since then, gradual remodeling and repositioning has begun and has already been completed on several levels.

The total floor space comes to around 13,000 square meters. The department store is visited by up to 30,000 people per day. The top floor is home to the "Sky Bar" bar and restaurant. The only Planet tax free office in the centre of Vienna is also located in the building.

== Culture ==
Wolfgang Amadeus Mozart composed the Magic Flute and the Requiem during the final year of his life in the small Kayserhaus, which stood on the site up until the middle of the 19th century (at Rauhensteingasse 8, at the back of the current building). A memorial plaque commemorates Mozart's death on 5 December 1791.
