= Hohe Brücke, Vienna =

Coordinates: 48°12′46″N 16°22′7″E

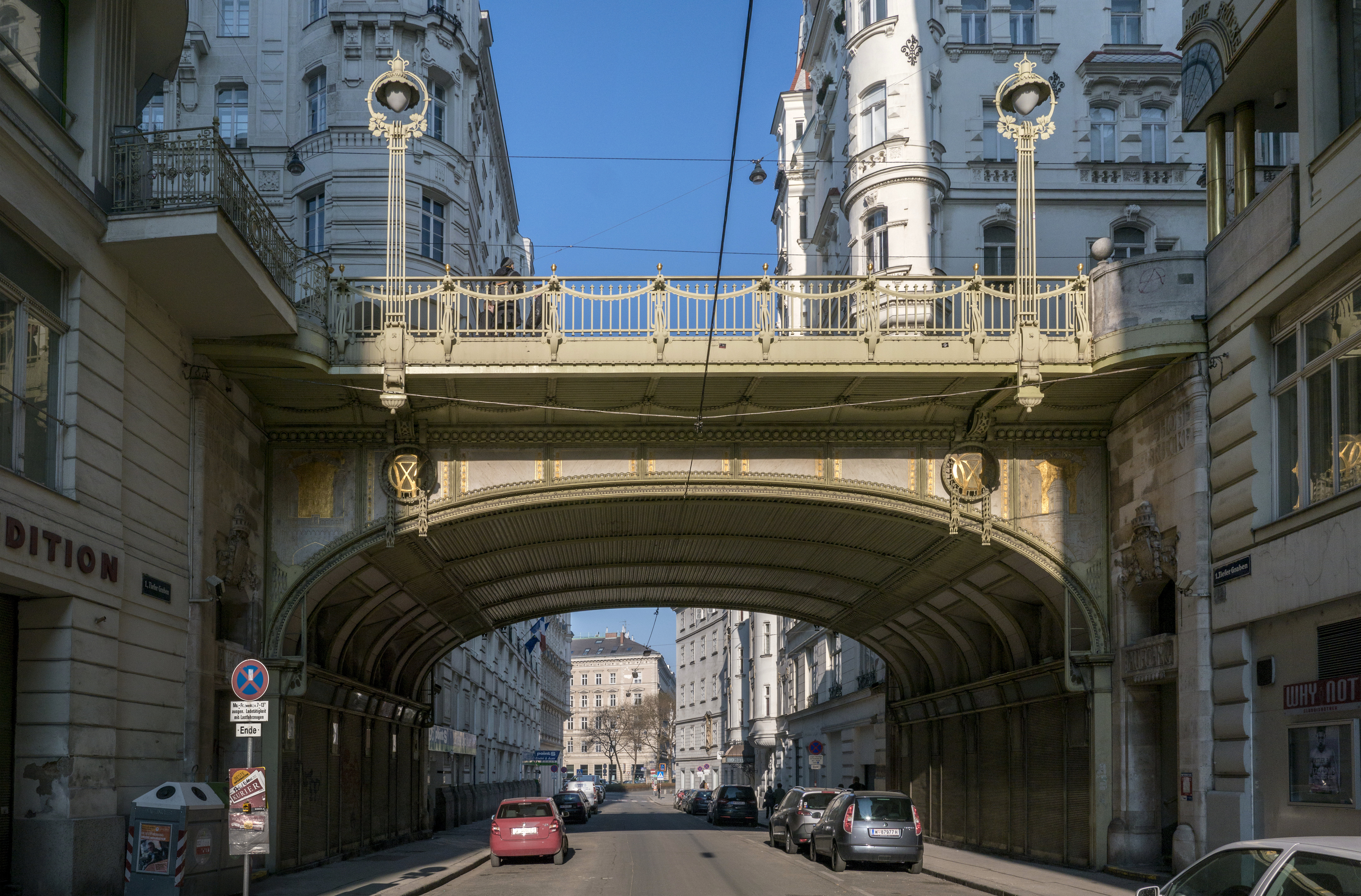
Hohe Brücke in Vienna

The Hohe Brücke (High Bridge) is a bridge across the Tiefer Graben in the Innere Stadt, Vienna, Austria. It links the two parts of Wipplingerstraße, which used to be separated by a canal. The current bridge was built in 1903.

== History ==
During the age of the Roman Empire, a Limes road crossed the Ottakringer Bach at this location. The Hohe Brücke (High Bridge) was first mentioned in documents in 1295, at that time as a simple wooden structure. Around the year 1200, the Ottakringer Bach and a branch of the Alserbach running in the same bed were diverted. Eventually, the streambed was filled in. From the mid-15th century, a masonry bridge with a Gothic pointed arch served as a road bridge.

In the 18th century, a chapel was erected on the bridge to house a statue dedicated to Saint John of Nepomuk, the patron saint of bridges. Between 1857 and 1858, the Hohe Brücke was rebuilt. The new structure, designed in the Neo-Gothic style, was constructed of brick and featured a stone balustrade as a railing. The bridge arch was designed in the form of a Tudor arch, and the chapel was not reconstructed.

In 1903, the bridge was demolished, as a new structure was required due to the widening of Wipplingerstraße. The first of the two traffic lanes was opened in November 1903, and the second in March 1904. The ceremonial laying of the final stone took place on 11 March 1904 in the presence of the Mayor Karl Lueger.

The new bridge was built in the Art Nouveau style, based on plans by architect Josef Hackhofer, and executed by the engineering firm Waagner Biro and court master builder Heinz Gerl. The outer façades were clad in marble, and the iron railing bars were decorated with ornamental designs. In the corner areas, depictions of the two previous bridge structures were incorporated. The inner side walls were styled to resemble storefronts with shutters, although these were purely decorative, as the depth behind the shutters was only about half a meter.

From 1979 to 1981, the bridge underwent general restoration. In 1996, further renovation was carried out, during which a new lighting concept was implemented. Today, the structure is protected as a historic monument and features a roadway with sidewalks on both sides. A staircase connects Wipplingerstraße with the Tiefen Graben located below.

== Gallery ==
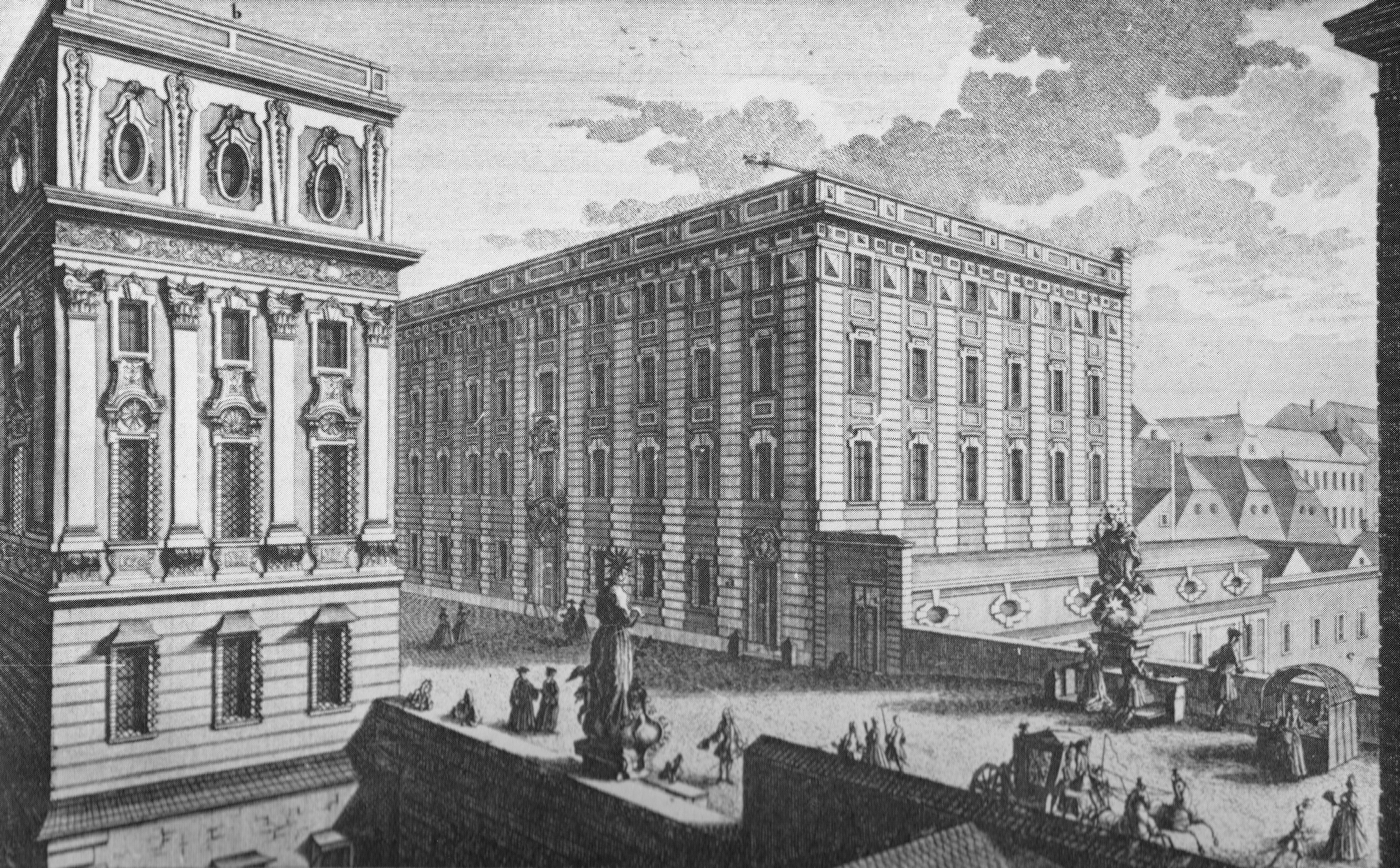
The Hohe Brücke in the 18th century.

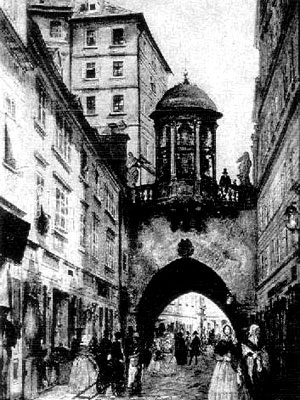
The Hohe Brücke with a chapel, before 1857.

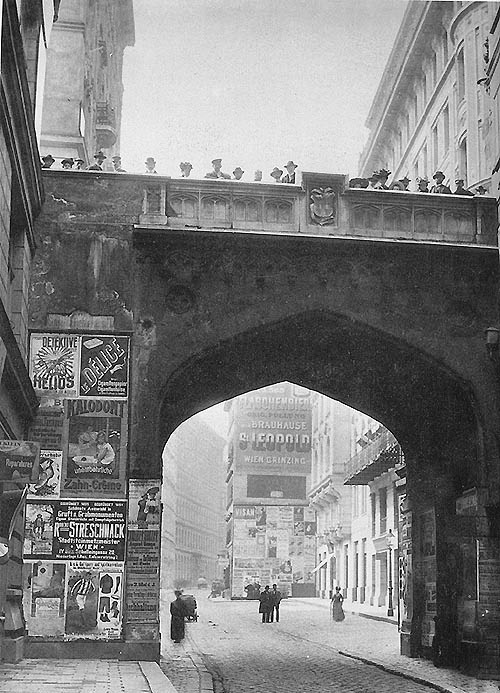
The Hohe Brücke around 1900.

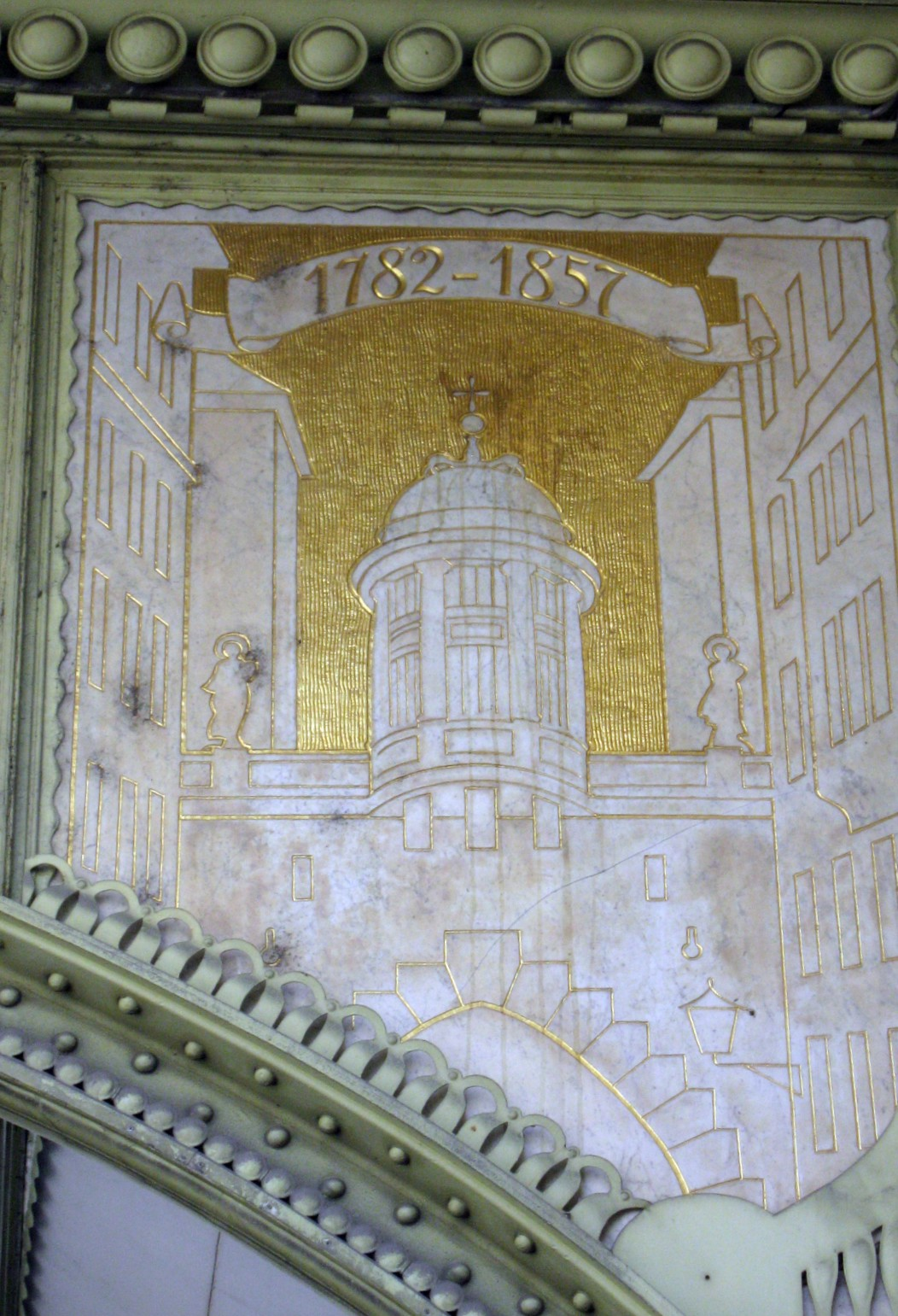
Engraving in the corner of the bridge

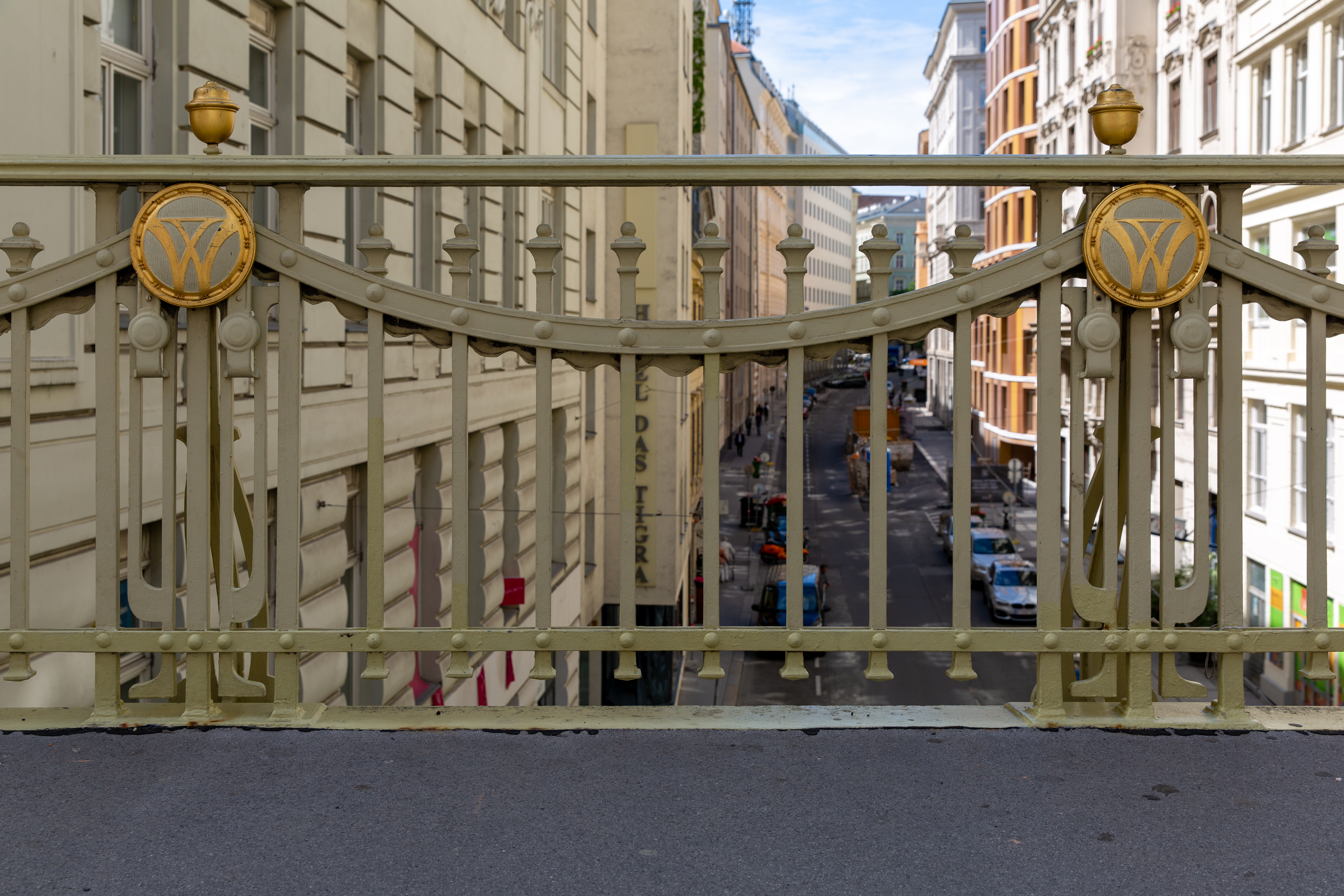
Railings on the bridge.

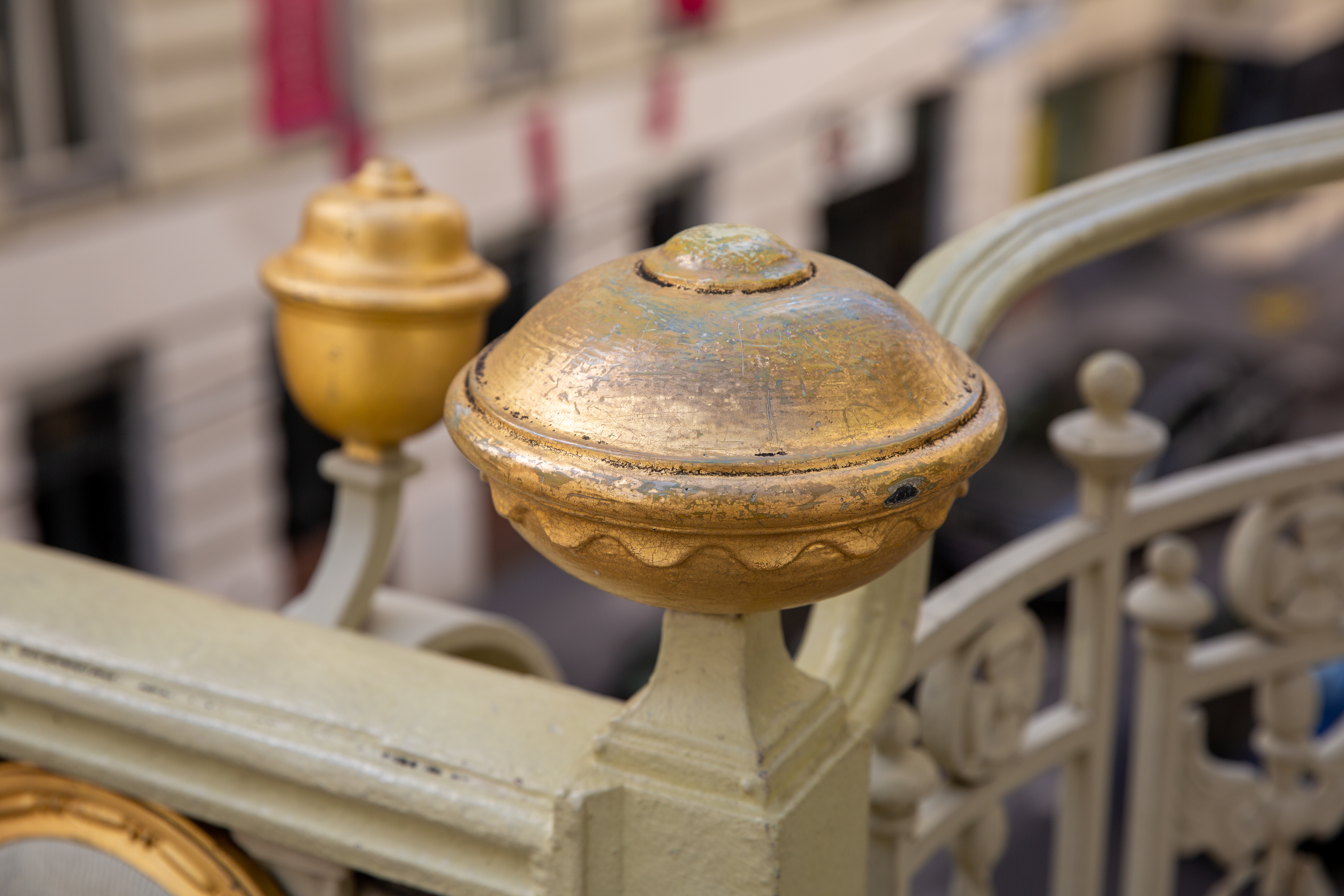
On the railings.

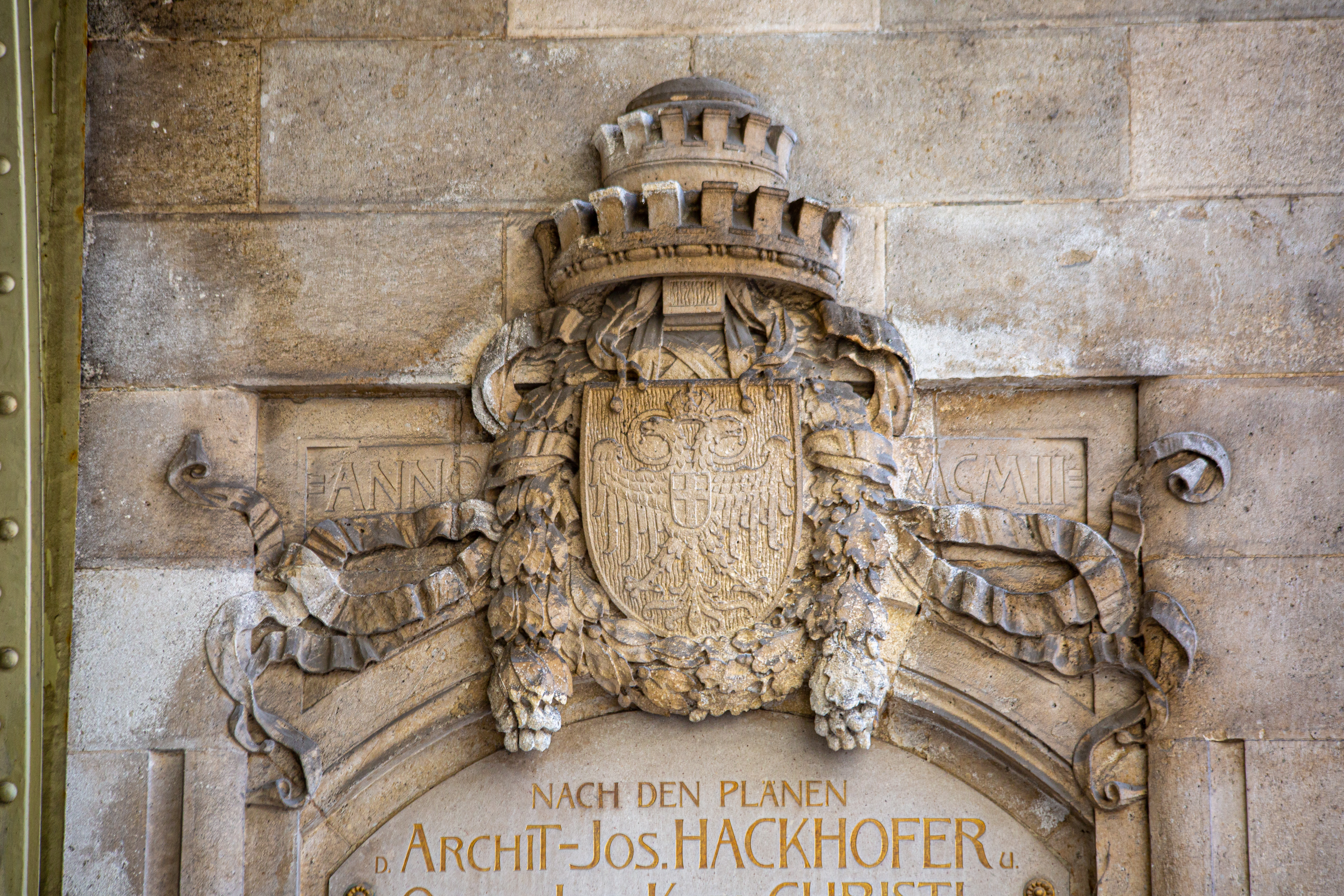
A seal on the bridge.

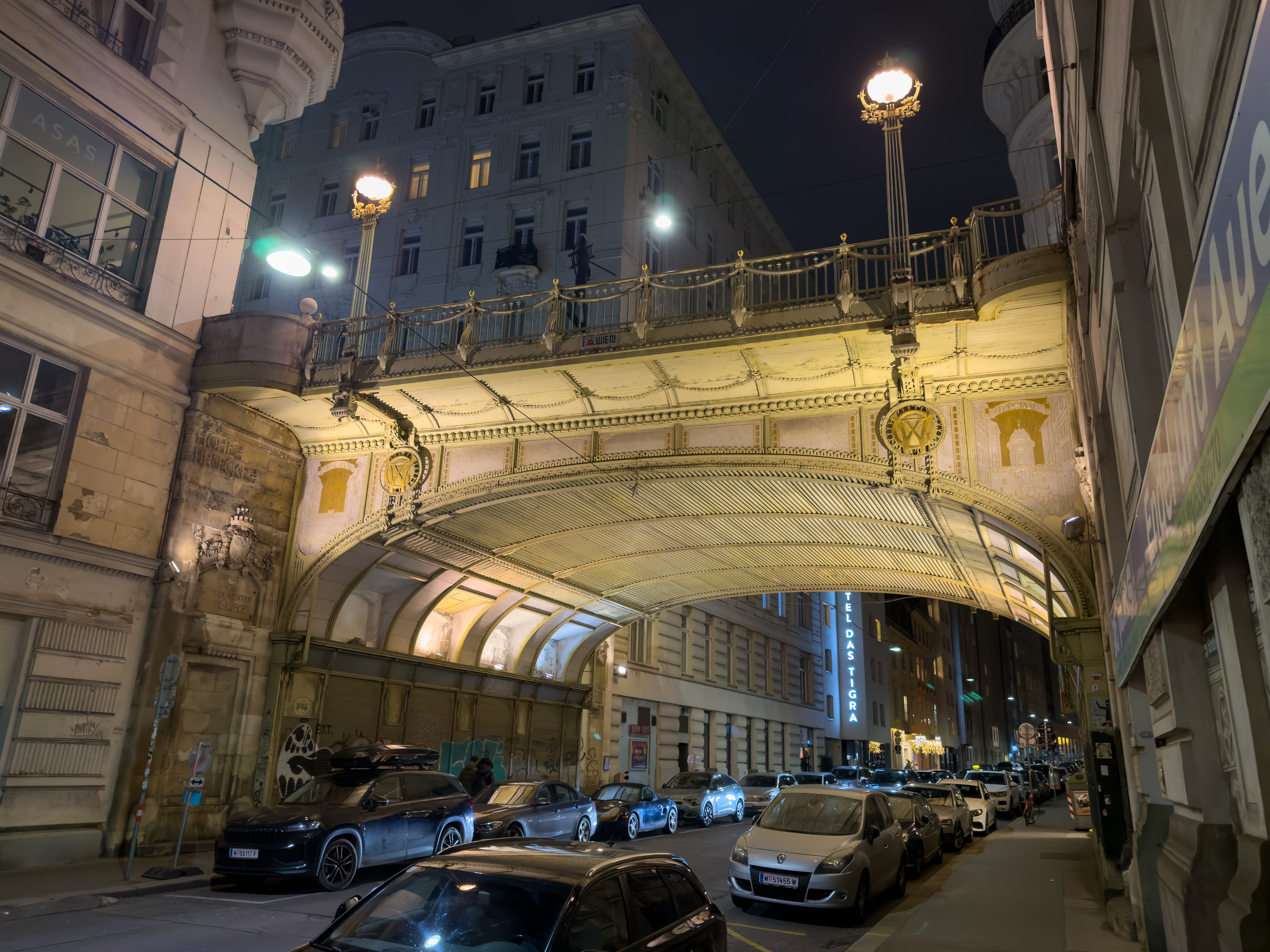
At night.
