= Palais Equitable =

Office building in Vienna, Austria

Coordinates: 48°12′29″N 16°22′18″E

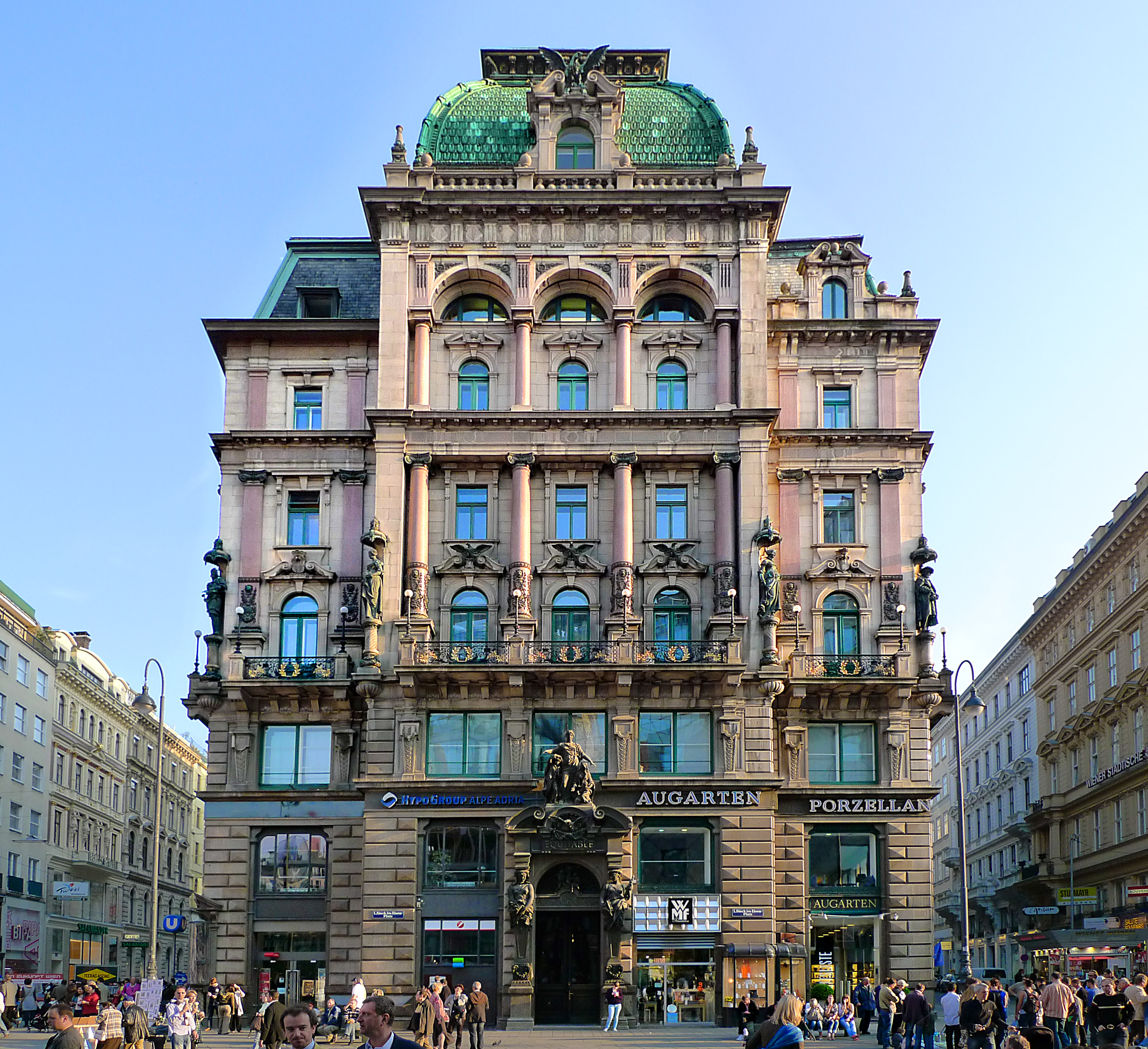
Palais Equitable on Stock-im-Eisen-Platz, Vienna

The Palais Equitable is an office building in Stock-im-Eisen-Platz (now part of Stephansplatz) in the Innere Stadt of Vienna, Austria, that was built in the 19th century for The Equitable Life Assurance Society of the United States and that incorporates a medieval nail-tree (the Stock im Eisen) on one exterior corner.

The building is on the site of five small medieval buildings that were demolished between 1856 and 1886, partly in order to expand Kärntner Straße. It was designed by Andreas Streit and constructed between 1887 and 1891.

The Palais Equitable has a richly detailed façade featuring American eagles. The Stock im Eisen, enclosed in glass, is in a niche on the Kärntner Straße corner of the building, and bronze reliefs by Rudolf Weyr on the main doors depict its history. The remainder of the ornamentation is by Viktor Oskar Tilgner and Johann Schindler.

The interior is also extremely sumptuous: marble from Hallein and granite from Saxony were used for the dramatic stairway and the vestibule, and the glass-covered interior courtyard is completely clad in tile and maiolica. (The stairway was apparently intended to be adaptable for access to a future subway.) A painting on the ceiling of the lobby and the stucco ornamentation on the second floor are by Julius Victor Berger.

Wilhelm Beck & Söhne, providers of uniforms to the Austro-Hungarian Empire, had its shop in the building, and the United States consulate was located there.

The Palais Equitable was damaged in World War II but was restored in 1949. The entrance area was renovated by Rüdiger Lainer in 1997. Today the building houses offices of various companies and organizations including the Austrian division of Sal. Oppenheim, and a retail outlet for Augarten Porcelain.

== Sources ==
- Eve Marie Young. Art and Enterprise: The 19th Century Administrative Buildings of a U.S. Life Insurance Company: With Particular Consideration of the Vienna, Austria, building known as "zum Stock in Eisen". Dissertation, University of Bonn, 1991
