= Stephansplatz, Vienna =

Square in Vienna, Austria

Coordinates: 48°12′30.30″N 16°22′20.90″E

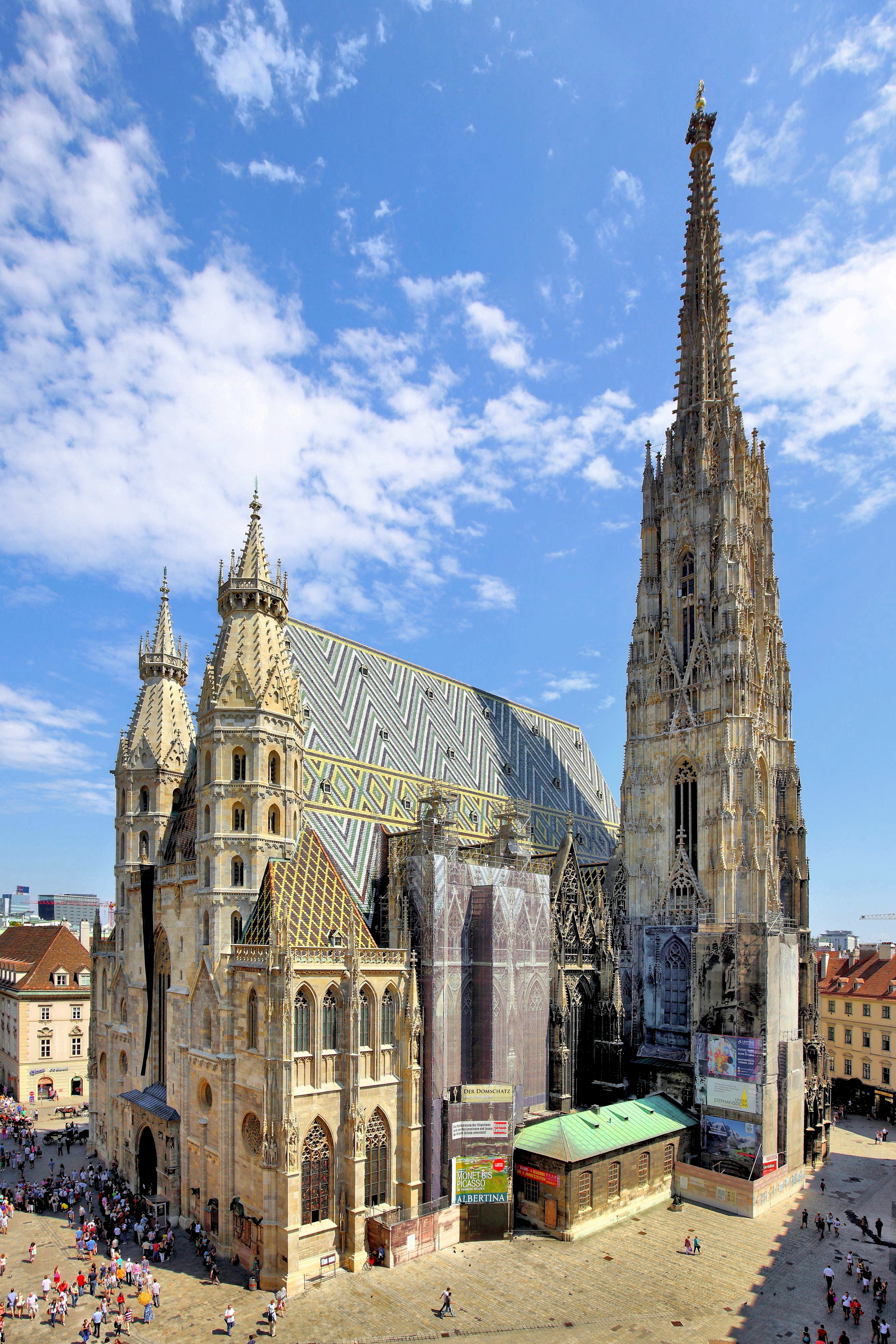
Stephansplatz, Vienna

The Stephansplatz is a square at the geographical centre of Vienna, Austria. It is named after its most prominent building, the Stephansdom, Vienna's cathedral and one of the tallest churches in the world. Before the 20th century, a row of houses separated Stephansplatz from Stock-im-Eisen-Platz, but since their destruction, the name Stephansplatz started to be used for the wider area covering both. To the west and south, respectively, run the exclusive shopping streets Graben (literally "ditch") and Kärntner Straße ("Kärnten" is the German for Carinthia). Opposite the Stephansdom is the Haas-Haus, a piece of striking modern architecture by Hans Hollein. Although public opinion was originally skeptical about the combination of the mediaeval cathedral and the glass and steel building, it is now considered an example of how old and new architecture can mix harmoniously.

== Stock im Eisen ==
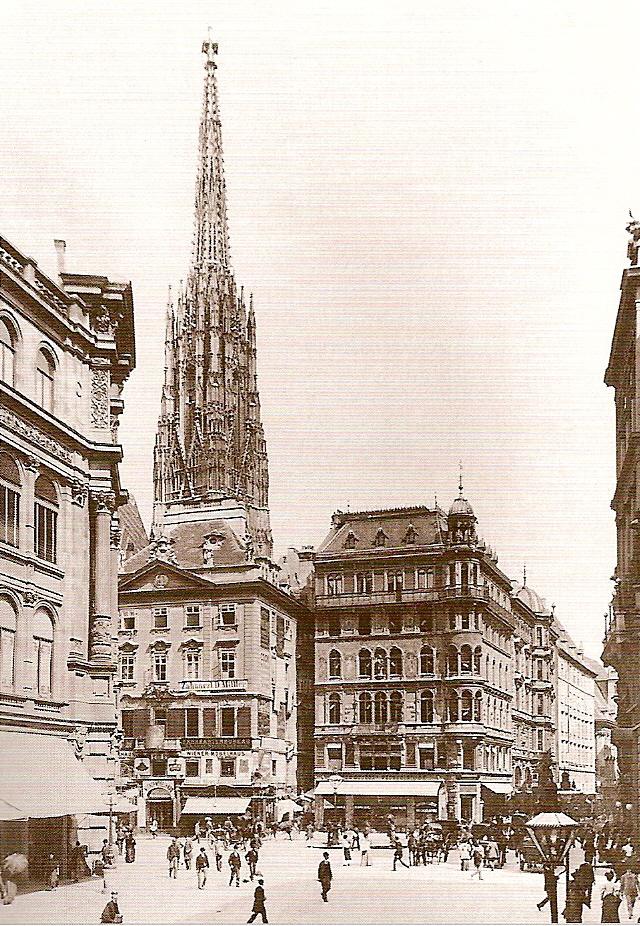
Stock-im-Eisen-Platz c. 1895, showing the row of buildings that used to separate Stephansplatz from Stock-im-Eisen-Platz

The Stock-im-Eisen ("staff in iron") is located at the corner of Kärntner Straße and Graben in a niche on the corner of the Palais Equitable. It is a section of tree trunk into which hundreds of nails have been hammered since the Middle Ages, and which is ringed by an iron band closed by a large padlock. The earliest written mention of it dates to 1533 and it is the subject of legends about the Devil.

== U-Bahn station ==
The U-Bahn station at Stephansplatz is one of the busiest in the city, and is the only junction between the U1 and U3 underground lines. It is also the nearest U-Bahn station to many of the tourist attractions in the city centre.

== Virgilkapelle ==
In 1973, during excavation works for the U-Bahn station, a mediaeval chapel was discovered 12 metres under current ground level . It was built around 1250 as a capella subterranea in the Magdalenenkapelle (the outline of which is shown on the pavement of the Stephansplatz). It is possible that it was originally intended as a chapel for burials, but at least by the 14th century had become a crypt for a mercantile family.

== In popular culture ==
The site was the scene of the assassination of Viktor Kedrin in the hugely popular BBC Show Killing Eve, he is murdered outside a sushi restaurant by the assassin Villanelle slicing his femoral artery.

== History ==
At the end of the 19th century, the entire square and its immediate surroundings underwent a redesign with increased building density. (Demolition of the area around the neighboring Brandstätte, moving back the building line at Stock-im-Eisen-Platz, removal of the Schmidlinsches Haus, etc.). In this context, Stephansplatz also briefly became a retail center, featuring the Rothberger department store and Anton Kranner's commercial building.

== See also ==
- Disappearance of Aeryn Gillern
