= Palais Bartolotti-Partenfeld =

Coordinates: 48°12′29″N 16°22′11″E

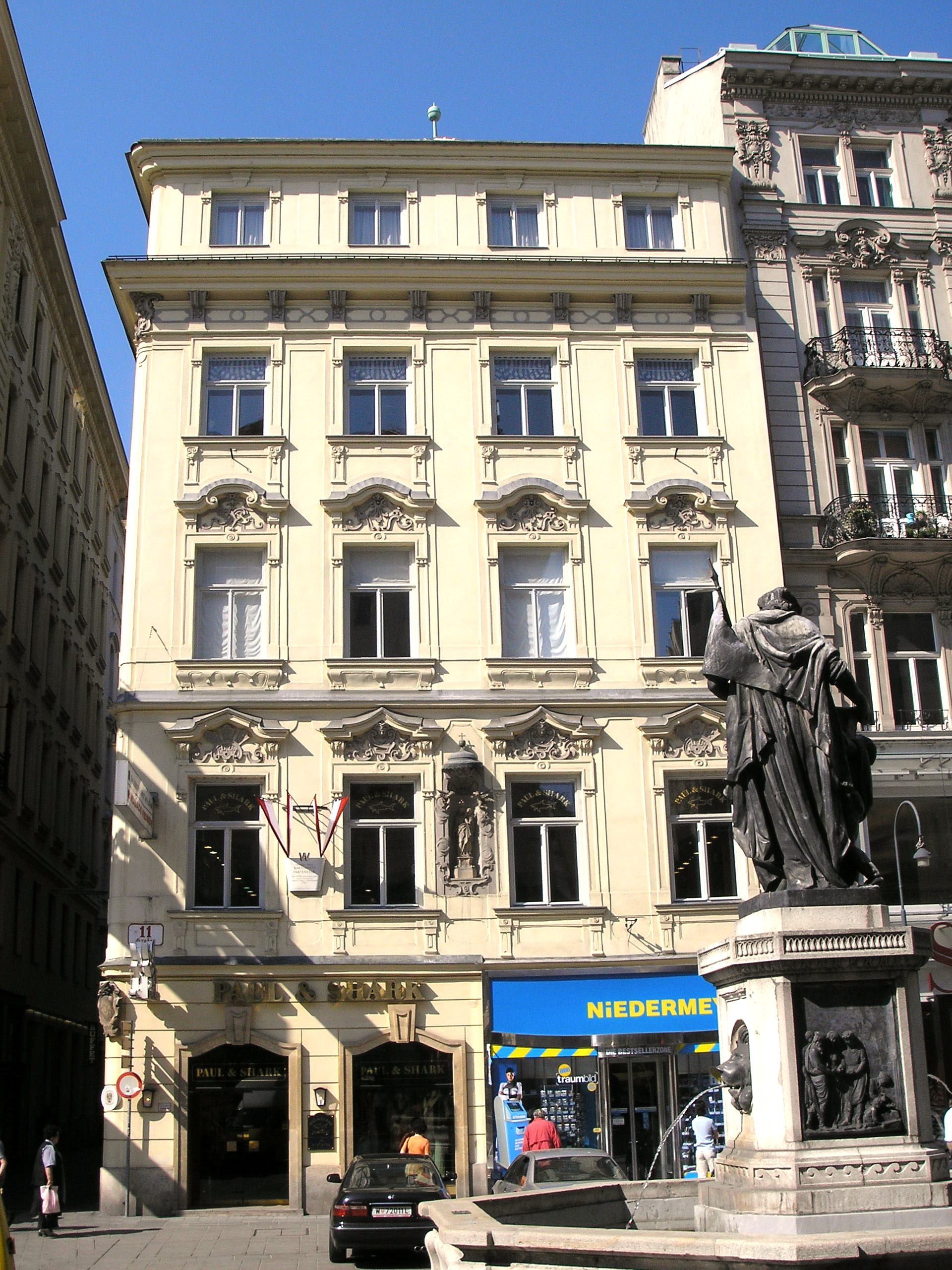
Palais Bartolotti-Partenfeld on Graben street in Vienna

The Palais Bartolotti-Partenfeld is a city-palace in central Vienna's 1st district, Inner City, on the corner of Graben and Dorotheergasse. It was originally built for the Bartolotti noble family and later bought by the Partenfeld family.
