= Hertha Firnberg =

Austrian politician (1909–1994)

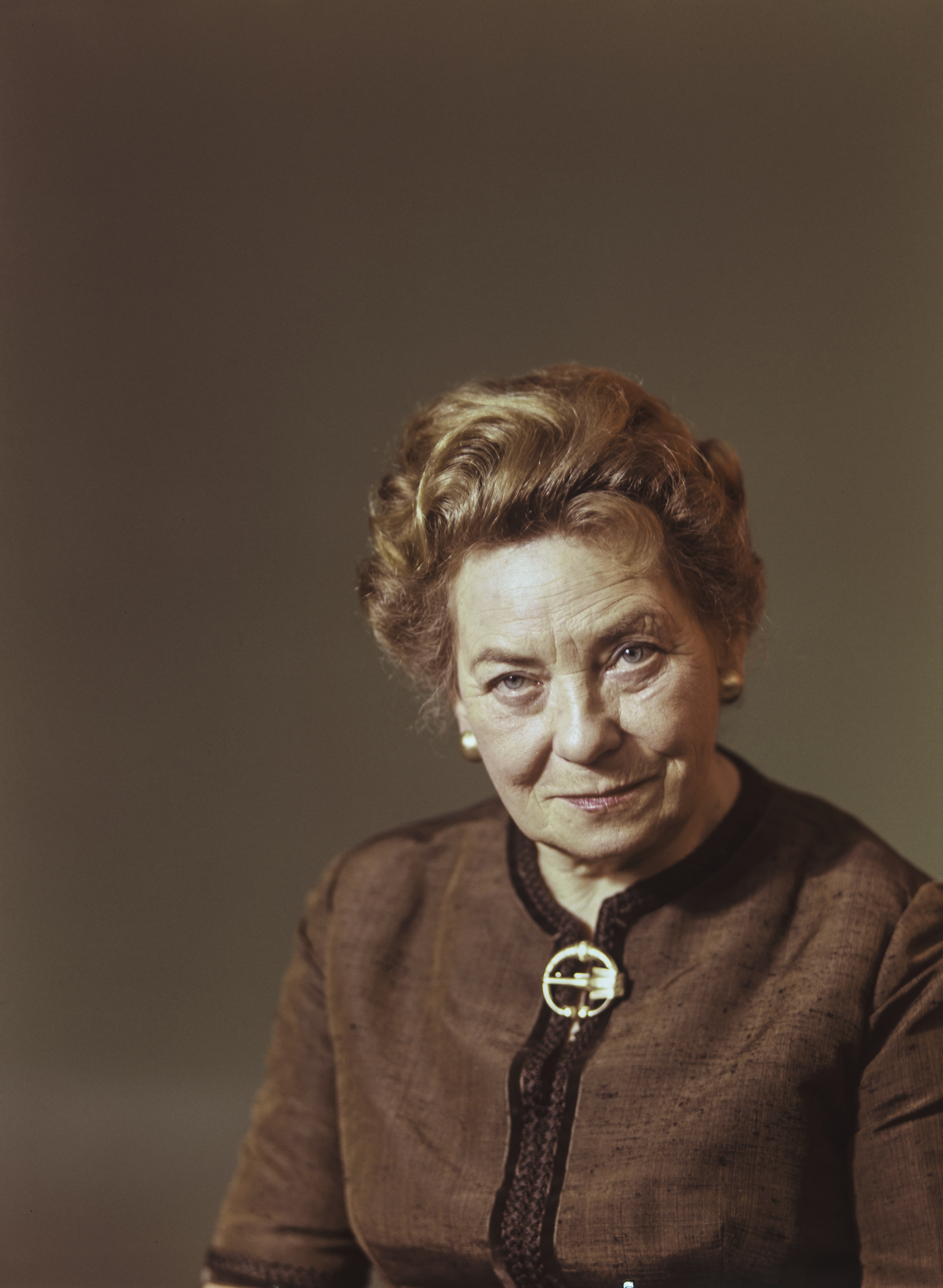
Hertha Firnberg in 1974.

Hertha Firnberg (18 September 1909 in Vienna – 14 February 1994 Vienna) was an Austrian politician.

== Life ==
Hertha Firnberg was born on 18 September 1909 as the eldest daughter of Anna, née Shamanek, and Dr. Josef Firnberg. She was born in the 18th district of Vienna, Währing. Later, the family moved to Niederrußbach in Lower Austria, where her father worked as a community doctor. After Hertha's birth, her mother gave up her job as a civil servant and gave birth to two brothers, and one sister.

After elementary school, she attended the middle school in Hernals Vienna. In 1926, she joined the Association of Socialist middle school students (VSM), in which she soon became deputy chairwoman. As a student at the University of Vienna, she was a member of the Association of Socialist Students (VSSt). In 1928, she joined the Social Democratic Workers Party, the leading party of the "Red Vienna". Together with her sister, she moved into a small housing estate in the 10th district, Favoriten. Trude ran a lending library in the house.

After two semesters, she changed to economic and social history. In 1930, she studied for a short time at the University of Freiburg. In February 1934, her political party was banned. In 1936, she received his doctorate with Alfons Dopsch in Vienna with a dissertation entitled "Wage workers and freelance work in the Middle Ages and at the beginning of modern times: A contribution to the history of agricultural wage labor in Germany." The work, published, in 1935, by Dopsch, identifies her as Hertha Hon-Firnberg. She was twice married briefly before the Second World War, both marriages ended in divorce.

As an active Social Democrat, Firnberg could not practice as a social researcher. She earned her living tutoring and as a freelance business journalist. From 1941 to 1945, she worked for Chic Parisien Bachwitz, a leading fashion publisher; at the same time she learned bookkeeping and operational management.

After the end of the war, Hertha Firnberg received a position as librarian and assistant at the University of Vienna. In addition, she learned statistics and their application to the economic and social events. In addition, she worked part-time in an advertising and statistics office. When she started working in the Lower Austrian Chamber of Labor in 1948, this was only in the reconstruction. Firnberg then became Senior Secretary, Department Head of Statistics and Head of the Study Library.

== Political career ==
From 1959–1963, Firnberg was member for Vienna of the Federal Council, and from 1963–1983 member of the National Council. In 1967, she succeeded Rosa Jochmann as chairman of socialist women and held this position until 1981. Their political home was the SPÖ district organization in Favoriten.

She has held posts in the National Council in the Finance, Education and Judiciary Committees, as well as the second chairwoman of the Foreign Affairs Committee, spokeswoman for the Socialist Group on education, science and research issues and legal reform issues, especially family law.

From 1959–1970, she was also a member of the Austrian delegation to the Consultative Assembly of the Council of Europe, Vice-President of its Commission for Refugee and Population Affairs and member of the Asylum Advisory Council in the Ministry of the Interior.

When Bruno Kreisky formed his first cabinet in 1970, Firnberg was initially appointed minister without a portfolio, but with the task of founding a federal ministry for science and research. The Ministry was established by law on 24 July 1970, Firnberg was appointed the first Minister of Science of Austria. She was only the second woman Minister in the history of Austria after Grete Rehor. In her term as a minister (1970–1983) – she also belonged to the federal governments Kreisky which enacted university reform in 1975 (University Organization Act 1975).

The Hertha Firnberg Programme is named after her.
