= Erwin Stolz =

Czech painter

Erwin Stolz (1896 Giesshuebel/Sauerbrunn - 1987 Vienna) was an Austrian painter and draughtsman.

== Biography ==
After an experience as agricultural engineer and captivity in Italy during the World War I, he devoted himself to painting, working as a sign painter, industrial graphic artist and attending numerous art courses in Vienna. He had contacts to Gustav Kurt Beck(1902–1983) who had an influence in the Viennese world in the spread of the avant-gardes, Erich Mallina (1873–1954) who introduced him in his mystical-religious worldview and in the theosophical society, George Kenner (1888–1971) who shared his experience in prison camps during the First World War, Alexander Rothaug(1870–1946) who was a great illustrator and symbolist painter as Stolz himself and the artists of union Hagenbund. He was also a friend of Josef Matthias Hauer (1883–1959) a composer and music theorist near to Arnold Schoenberg whose art was considered degenerate art by nazism. In his career Stolz followed various artistic currents. He had a classical training which was admirably expressed in portraits, in liberty paintings (nouveau and deco in particular) and in symbolism that distinguishes many of his drawings and temperas in which he expressed an art of great graphic quality highly influenced by Max Klinger (1857 - 1920) and Gust Klimt (1862 - 1918). In the 20s, however, alongside these trends he also became interested in expressionist painting and in the New Objectivity as can be appreciated in some portraits and in the numerous nudes made from 1925 to the end of the 30s which was his most fruitful period. After the World War II his painting was oriented above all in a surrealist key.

== Works ==
- "Fighting Knights", oil on canvas, Signed with monogram, Galleria d'arte moderna Aroldo Bonzagni
- "Mother and child eating grapes", Gouache and watercolor. Signed with monogram.
- "Temptation", Tempera on paper. Signed with monogram
- "After the fall - Eve and Adam", Gouache and tempera.Signed with monogram
- "Mother and child in an enchanted winter landscape", Tempera on Cardboard. Signed with monogram
- "Doge und Dogaresse", Tempera. Signed with monogram
- "Im Garten Eden", Oil on Board. Signed with monogram.
- "Emergence of spring", Tempera on paper laid on cotton. Signed with monogram.
- "Lovers" Watercolor and gouache.Signed with monogram.
- "Andante mysterioso", coloured pencils on paper, Signed with monogram, c. 1920, The Jack Daulton Collection, Los Altos Hills
- "Magical Landscape", pen and ink on paper, Signed with monogram, c. 1920, The Jack Daulton Collection, Los Altos Hills
- "Eve", Oil on paper (framed), Initialed and dated 1920, The Adriana Williams Collection, USA.
- "Destiny", pen and black ink, signed with monogram, 1924
- "Celestial figures", pen and black ink, with monogram,
- "Tragedy", pen and black ink, with monogram,
- "The bathers", pen and black ink, signed with monogram, 1926
- "The life of Jesus", pen and black ink, signed with monogram, 1937
- "Peasants at work", pen and black ink, signed with monogram, 1938
- "The holy family", pen and black ink, signed with monogram, c. 1925
