= Chic Parisien Bachwitz =

Viennese fashion publishing house (1894–1958)

- Native name: Bachwitz A. G.
- Formerly: Chic Parisien-Bachwitz A. G.
- Industry: Fashion publishing
- Founded: 1894
- Founder: Arnold Bachwitz
- Defunct: 1958
- Headquarters: Vienna, Austria

Chic Parisien Bachwitz (registered as Bachwitz A. G. from 1924 and as Chic Parisien-Bachwitz A. G. by 1938) was a Viennese fashion publishing house, active from 1894 until 1958.

It was founded by Arnold Bachwitz (1854–1930) and produced fashion magazines and dress patterns for an international market. Its base was the Palais des Beaux Arts, the building it commissioned in 1908–09 at Löwengasse 47 in Vienna's third district.

The Bachwitz family were Jewish. After the Anschluss in 1938 the company was "Aryanized", and in 1940 its shares passed to the publishing house of the German Labour Front; it was struck off the commercial register in 1958.

== History ==
=== Foundation, 1894–1908 ===
Arnold Bachwitz was born on June 3, 1854 at Neustadt (Dosse) in Prussia and came to Vienna in 1876 as a specialist in fashion. He worked first in the ready-made clothing trade and became a partner in the firm Freudenthal & Bachwitz. (Note: Payer describes him as having migrated to Vienna from Halle an der Saale.) As early as 1883 he was running a business specializing in women's coats with a partner, and shortly afterwards founded a fashion atelier on the Hoher Markt. On regular visits to Paris he followed current trends, which he sold in Vienna under the label "Chic Parisien".

In 1894, alongside that business, Bachwitz founded a fashion publishing house, later known as Chic Parisien. Its first title, Der Modezeichner, appeared in 1898. It was followed by the magazine Chic Parisien (1898–1929), whose name the house itself came to carry. (Note: Other early titles included Die große Mode (1900–1922), Die elegante Frau (1900–1929) and The Coming Season (1920–1929).) As the publishing business grew it took extensive premises on several floors of a large new building at Hoher Markt 7, and Bachwitz left Freudenthal & Bachwitz in order to devote himself entirely to his fashion journals. He was also director of the Vienna fashion exhibition, held several times around the turn of the century in the halls of the Vienna Horticultural Society.

Bachwitz's journals took the highest awards at exhibitions in Austria and abroad, among them the Paris world exhibition of 1900. He founded the Wiener Modeklub and organized exhibitions for it at home and abroad. The Ministry of Trade appointed him to the advisory council of the commercial statistical service and gave him the title of Kommerzialrat. He was also awarded the Civil Merit Cross, second class, for humanitarian work during the First World War. (Note: The awarding of the title was reported in January 1927.)

=== The Palais des Beaux Arts, 1908–1909 ===
Within a few years the Hoher Markt premises were too small. In 1909 Bachwitz bought land in the Löwengasse, in Vienna's third district, and had a palace-like corner building erected there to his own specifications and plans. An extension followed a few years later. The building, at Löwengasse 47 on the corner of Paracelsusgasse, was designed by the architects Anton and Josef Drexler and built in 1908–09. Bachwitz had the words "Chic Parisien", and later "Palais des Beaux Arts", placed above the entrance portal. The façades were lettered "Wien", "London", "New York" and "Paris". According to Payer, the lettering and the golden globes borne by the figures on the corner tower pointed to the international agenda of the building's client.

More than three hundred people worked in the complex, in design, tailoring and sewing, hand-painting, the photographic studio and distribution, and in the printing works in the basement.

=== Moderne Welt, 1918–1939 ===
In October 1918 Bachwitz engaged Ludwig Hirschfeld (born 1882), a columnist of the Neue Freie Presse who lived nearby, as editor-in-chief of the newly founded magazine Moderne Welt. Over the next two decades it became one of Austria's leading illustrated magazines. The photography historian Anton Holzer has described it as a pioneering project. Comparable illustrated magazines were not founded until the mid-1920s, whereas Moderne Welt appeared from the outset in large format and with an aesthetically ambitious presentation. It carried its own art prints and made extensive use of modern photography.

The magazine appeared monthly, every two weeks from 1923, and monthly again from the early 1930s. (Note: The editorial office was at first in Löwengasse 47 and from 1920 in the extension at Paracelsusgasse 9, where Hirschfeld had his office on the first floor.) It was sold in bookshops, tobacconists and newsstands, and was laid out in coffee houses, hotels and guesthouses as well as in sanatoria and spa establishments.

Its contributors included Arthur Schnitzler, Stefan Zweig, Hugo von Hofmannsthal, Thomas and Heinrich Mann, Hermann Hesse and Sigmund Freud. (Note: The other contributors Payer names are Egon Friedell, Alice Schalek, Roda Roda, Béla Balázs, Hermann Bahr, Raoul Auernheimer, Ernst Lothar, Alfons Petzold, Ann Tizia Leitich and Anton Wildgans.) Hirschfeld was supported by the journalist and fashion writer Ea von Allesch (1875–1953), an established figure in Vienna's artistic and coffee-house circles. Writing under the pseudonym "Eva", she ran the magazine's twenty-page fashion supplement for its first three years. Payer describes her as a pioneer in the previously male-dominated genre of fashion journalism. She treated dress in a wider cultural-historical and economic frame, and returned repeatedly in her ironic columns to the changing of gender roles. She left in the summer of 1922 for the Prager Presse.

The literary critic Julian Sternberg, Hirschfeld's colleague at the Neue Freie Presse, wrote for the magazine from 1921, publishing some two hundred reviews over six years under the heading "Bücher von denen man spricht". Humorous material came from a group of largely young graphic artists and illustrators. (Note: Among them Walter Essenther, Marie Bucek, Melly Bachrich and Leo Ledvinka.) Photographs came from the leading Viennese studios of the day, (Note: Setzer, Schein, Löwy, Glogau, Kolliner, Fleischmann and Geiringer/Horovitz.) and above all from Madame d'Ora, whose work appeared in almost every issue. Younger women working in fashion photography, among them Trude Fleischmann, Kitty Hoffmann, Edith Glogau and Edith Barakovich, found a platform in its pages.

Hirschfeld left the magazine in 1926. In 1927 Bachwitz was named in the imprint as proprietor, publisher and responsible editor alike. During the same volume year he sold it to the Viennese publisher Adolf Luser, and from 1929 the Adolf Luser Verlag issued it from Berlin, although it was still printed in Vienna.

Alexander Schilling-Schletter, named as responsible editor under Luser in 1930, appears in 1931 as proprietor, publisher and editor in his own name. Later that year the magazine passed to a company of its own name, with Schilling-Schletter as editor-in-chief. In 1935 its imprint named Guido Zernatto, secretary-general of the Fatherland Front, as the magazine's director. (Note: Luser's imprint of 1928 names Josef Eberhart as responsible editor. The company of 1931 was at Weihburggasse 18–20 in Vienna's first district, with Paul Gunst as publishing director. From 1932 Wolfgang Foges was responsible editor; by 1937 the magazine had moved to Führichgasse 6 and Paul Steiner had replaced Foges; and during 1938 Berta Noë was named as responsible editor.)

Its issue for April 1938, published within weeks of the Anschluss, opened with a full page carrying a swastika and a portrait of Hitler beneath a statement signed by the magazine's editorship. The statement welcomed the annexation and described the magazine as presenting topical material "as a German fashion magazine" for the first time in its twenty-year existence. It ceased publication at the end of 1939.

=== The picture gallery ===
Bachwitz was a patron of the Künstlerhaus and an active art dealer. In the years before his death he attached to the company a picture gallery occupying several rooms of the building. His obituary called it the Galerie der schönen Künste and described it as the largest permanent selling exhibition of paintings in Vienna, through which numerous Austrian artists were supported.

The gallery traded under the building's own name, its catalogue appearing as Palast der schönen Künste with the French form Palais des Beaux Arts as a running head. It advertised a permanent exhibition of oil paintings and watercolors by leading masters, with free admission and fixed catalogue prices, and gave its holdings as some 2,000 items. (Note: The gallery opened daily from nine until six. Two catalogues were issued, one illustrated and one giving prices, with weekly printed supplements listing new acquisitions and a monthly illustrated supplement sent to customers free on request; the illustrated catalogue reproduced about ninety works. The management guaranteed the authenticity of the works it sold, delivered free of charge within Vienna, shipped to any country and obtained the necessary export permits. Paintings by living artists were appraised without charge and either bought outright or taken on commission.)

The gallery was at first a separate business registered to Bachwitz personally, until his art publishing license passed to the company in January 1925. (Note: It was registered as Palast der schönen Künste, Malerei und Plastik, of Löwengasse 47, and was struck from the register on October 21, 1924, when its trade license was surrendered. The company, at the same address, then applied for a concession as an art publisher.)

On Bachwitz's seventy-fifth birthday in 1929, and again in its notice of his death the following year, the trade journal Oesterreichische Buchhändler-Correspondenz credited him with having stimulated the Viennese art market by creating the selling gallery.

The catalogue's foreword states that the gallery showed works by outstanding artists at home and abroad, and of Vienna and Austria in particular, but that the extremely modern tendencies had been excluded. Foreign art was represented by German, Italian and French works. Artists shown included Friedrich Gauermann and the British painter Luke Fildes, as well as Rudolf von Alt. (Note: The catalogue also names Hugo Darnaut, Hugo Charlemont, Ludwig Dill, Alexander Rothaug, Franz Roubaud, Ernst Graner and Eduard Kasparides; Payer also names Erwin Pendl among those exhibited.)

=== Ownership and board, 1924–1938 ===
In 1924 the company was registered as Bachwitz A. G., Palast der schönen Künste und Modenverlag, of Löwengasse 47. (Note: Its share capital was 1.6 billion kronen, divided into 160,000 fully paid bearer shares of 10,000 kronen each.) Its board then included Arnold Bachwitz as president, Alexander Byk, Willy Lebach and Adolf Strel. (Note: The other members were the lawyer Adolf Bachrach, Ernest William Bell of London, Moritz Birnbaum and Felix Seyferth. Willy Lebach was described as a manufacturer in Düsseldorf.) Alexander Byk had taken over the direction of the then still very small company around 1900. He was its vice-president and general director until his sudden death in October 1933. By that year Adolf Strel was signing as president.

Arnold Bachwitz died in November 1930. At his grave the company's board, its atelier, its works council and its commercial staff each sent a speaker. (Note: Hans Michelfeit for the administrative board, Edmund Goldberger for the atelier, Karl Peter for the works council, and Egon Byk for the commercial staff.) The company's 20,000 shares passed to a number of people whom the City of Vienna's later restitution report declined to name on data-protection grounds.

By 1938 the board consisted of Rosine Bachwitz, Egon Byk (Alexander Byk's son), Willy Lebach, Adolf Strel and Alice Strel. Grete Lebach was entered on the management board on January 11 of that year. A company report drawn up in October 1939 lists the shareholders as Arnold Bachwitz's widow Rosine Bachwitz, their daughter Alice Strel and the estate of their daughter Grete Lebach.

=== "Aryanization", 1938–1939 ===
The company had been in serious financial difficulty since 1937, which its own board described as the worst year in its existence. The Anschluss cost it a further 30 percent of its export premiums, as the German market closed to it.

The Bachwitz family were Jewish, and most of the company's administrative board fell under the Nuremberg Laws. After the Anschluss both the publishing house and the building were "Aryanized". Decrees of April 1938 created the legal basis for the seizure of Jewish property. The Vermögensverkehrsstelle, established the following month under Walter Rafelsberger, supervised and carried out such transfers and set the purchase price itself. Even those sums, far below actual value, were in part withheld against supposed tax arrears and levies. The Vermögensverkehrsstelle ordered the appointment of Ernst Kuhn as commissarial manager of the company, to carry through negotiations that lasted some eighteen months.

The entire board was replaced between 1938 and 1939. A register notice of May 11, 1938 recorded the deletion of all six members, among them Rosine Bachwitz and her daughters, and the entry of six new ones, among them the printers Friedrich Jasper and Alfred Leithe-Jasper. (Note: Those deleted were Adolf Strel, Willy Lebach, Alice Strel, Egon Byk, Rosine Bachwitz and Grete Lebach; those entered were Friedrich Jasper, Alfred Leithe-Jasper, Friedrich Buchmayer, Rudolf Frey, Franz Patzelt and Erich Leithe-Jasper.) Both men had been among the mourners at Arnold Bachwitz's funeral in November 1930, and Friedrich Jasper's firm had printed Moderne Welt for the company in 1923.

In November 1938 the firm sent a collection of 45 of its fashion magazines to the City of Vienna at the instigation of the Vermögensverkehrsstelle, in connection with a planned takeover. The shares were at first to go to the Jasper printing house. In May 1939, however, the Vermögensverkehrsstelle annulled that contract and approved a takeover by the publisher Adolf Luser instead. As a result, Luser and Kuhn were appointed to the board, each with independent authority to represent and sign for the company.

=== The German Labour Front and the Wiener Weltmode-Verlag, 1940–1945 ===
On November 4, 1940 a shareholders' meeting resolved the purchase of the company's 20,000 shares. It was chaired by Heinz Brüggen, managing director of the publishing house of the German Labour Front. That publishing house thereby became the company's owner. The existing supervisory board was compelled to resign, and a new one was elected, composed entirely of Germans from the Reich. Later the same month Luser was removed from the management board; in Schwarz's account he had evidently been intended only to prepare the takeover. Waldemar Arndt and Ludwig Fehrle were appointed in his place.

The company was renamed Wiener Weltmode-Verlag; the change was entered in the commercial register in June 1941. Its registered business was widened well beyond fashion publishing. (Note: To the publication and distribution of works of literature, painting, sculpture, music and photography, to art dealing, to the exploitation of patents, and to holdings in related firms at home and abroad.) A letter from the Vienna Chamber of Commerce recorded that the firm had been charged with carrying out measures of an educational-political character in the field of fashion, within the Labour Front's cultural and economic program.

In September 1941 the company was converted into a limited liability company. (Note: Its managing directors were Arndt, Wilhelm Birmelin and Fehrle. Ernst Sopper was a managing director from March 1942 to January 1943.) From 1943 until the end of the war the Labour Front's publishing house was the company's sole shareholder.

The firm's fashion journals continued to appear throughout. Issues of Le Grand Tailleur for 1942 name the Wiener Weltmode Verlag AG as publisher, and the title was still being issued in 1943.

=== Liquidation and restitution, 1946–1958 ===
Because the assets were owned by the German Labour Front, they fell to the Republic of Austria under the Verbotsgesetz. On February 9, 1946 the Federal Ministry of Education appointed Anton Heinrich Drexler as public administrator. The company existed only on paper. The appointment served merely to secure the assets, and the Republic neither liquidated, sold nor managed the business. Public administration was lifted on October 20, 1956, and the company was struck off the commercial register on February 7, 1958. The owners from before 1938 never filed a restitution claim.

In 2003 the Vienna City Library, reviewing acquisitions made during the Nazi period, identified the 45 magazines received in November 1938 as having come from an "Aryanized" firm. The Vienna Restitution Commission recommended their return on February 18, 2003, and in June they were handed to two great-grandchildren of Arnold Bachwitz.

== Publications ==
The company's business consisted largely in preparing French fashion magazines for Austrian readers. Among its titles were Die elegante Frau (Grand Mode Parisienne), Die elegante Wienerin (La Parisienne) and Wiener Mode-Album (Revue Parisienne). Others appeared under English or French titles, among them The Fashion Designer, Revue Mondaine and Les Tailleurs de Luxe. The plates were hand-colored, and carried the signature "Atelier Bachwitz" in the lower corner.

By 1938 the company published around fifty magazines with print runs between 1,300 and 60,000, many in trilingual editions. Exports accounted for 95 percent of turnover, and it employed about 320 people. Its distribution partners reached from Paris and New York to Auckland and Melbourne. (Note: Payer lists them in Vienna, Paris, Prague, Berlin, Brussels, Milan, Barcelona, Madrid, Minsk, New York, Auckland and Melbourne.) The company presented itself as one of the highest-turnover and most innovative firms in a Viennese fashion publishing sector that boomed in the 1920s. In 1927 the Illustrierte Kronen Zeitung described Bachwitz as having made the firm one of the leading fashion-journal and magazine publishers in Europe, and as among the first to promote Austrian fashion design abroad.

== The Bachwitz family ==
Arnold Bachwitz died in Vienna on November 12, 1930 and was buried four days later at the Vienna Central Cemetery. His death notice named his widow Rosine; his daughters Grete Lebach and Alice Strel; his sons-in-law Willy Lebach and Adolf Strel; and two grandchildren, Karla Reines-Strel and Theodore Gottlieb-Lebach.

Rosine Bachwitz was born Rosine Kraus in Vienna on September 2, 1863. In 1938 Vienna's address directory listed her at the company's address, Löwengasse 47. Her last address in Vienna was Aspernbrückengasse 1, in Leopoldstadt. She was deported from Vienna to Theresienstadt on July 14, 1942 and died on October 30, 1942. The Documentation Centre of Austrian Resistance gives her place of death as Theresienstadt; Yad Vashem records it as unknown.

Her daughter Alice Strel, born in Vienna on November 4, 1887, was a pianist. She was deported from Prague to Ujazdów on June 10, 1942 and did not survive; neither the Documentation Centre of Austrian Resistance nor Yad Vashem records a date or a place of death. Her husband Adolf Strel died in Vienna on March 18, 1938, six days after the Anschluss.

The second daughter, Grete Lebach, was born in 1885. Before her marriage to Willy Lebach she had been married to a man surnamed Gottlieb. She died of cancer at the Rothschild Hospital in Vienna in August 1938. Albert Einstein was a friend of the family. He stayed with the Lebachs in Düsseldorf in September 1926 and wrote verses for them, and Lotte Jacobi photographed him sailing with Grete Lebach about 1937.

Willy Lebach, born 1873, was a co-proprietor of Gebr. Lebach AG in Elberfeld. He survived the war and died in 1962. (Note: The Harry Ransom Center holds nine letters and telegrams sent to him by Einstein between 1938 and 1953.)

Grete Lebach's son Theodore Gottlieb, later known in the United States as the performer Brother Theodore, was taken to Dachau on his thirty-second birthday in November 1938 and released after signing over the family's fortune for a single mark.

== Legacy and collections ==
The company is treated in Gerda Buxbaum's history of Viennese fashion, Mode aus Wien 1815–1938 (1986), which is the source for much of the account of its early titles in the City of Vienna's restitution report. Its history was revisited in 2024 by the historian Peter Payer in the Wien Museum Magazin. The building's history is also the subject of Palais des Beaux Arts Wien, an online art project that Payer describes as a virtual memorial and a platform for digital art.

Moderne Welt has been digitized by the Austrian National Library and is available through its ANNO newspaper archive, as are the company's fashion titles Wiener Blusenmodelle, Beaux Arts de Modes and Le Grand Tailleur.

The building the company commissioned survives at Löwengasse 47 and is protected as a listed monument.
