= Palais des Beaux Arts, Vienna =

Coordinates: 48.20682°N 16.39421°E

The Palais des Beaux Arts is an Art Nouveau building at Löwengasse 47-47A in Vienna's third district, Landstraße, that currently houses the embassies of the Republic of Lithuania and the Republic of Moldova (since 1994), as well as the Palais des Beaux Arts Wien, an artist-run art institution and place of remembrance. The building was erected between 1908 and 1909 by Anton and Josef Drexler, who also designed several houses on Rudolf-von-Alt-Platz and contributed other designs to the surrounding Weißgerberviertel quarter of the district. The building was originally built as home to Chic Parisien, a center for fashion.

== History ==
The building was commissioned by Arnold Bachwitz (1854–1930) as a fashion publishing house, later known as Chic Parisien, after its premises on the Hoher Markt had become too small. Bachwitz had the words "Chic Parisien", and later "Palais des Beaux Arts", placed above the entrance, and the façades lettered "Wien", "London", "New York" and "Paris"; according to the historian Peter Payer, the lettering and the globes held by the figures on the corner tower pointed to the international ambitions of the building's client. More than three hundred people worked in the complex, in design, tailoring, hand-painting, photography and distribution, with a printing works in the basement. In the years before his death Bachwitz also opened a picture gallery in several rooms of the building, which traded under the building's own name as the Palast der schönen Künste.

The Bachwitz family were Jewish. After the Anschluss in March 1938 both the publishing house and the building were "Aryanized". The company's entire board was replaced, and in November 1940 its shares passed to the publishing house of the German Labour Front. Arnold Bachwitz's widow, Rosine, was deported from Vienna to Theresienstadt in July 1942 and died in October of that year; their daughter Alice Strel was deported from Prague in June 1942 and did not survive. After the war the company existed only on paper; its assets fell to the Republic of Austria, and it was struck off the commercial register in 1958.

== Architecture ==
Its architecture features an original combination of elements of late Historicism and decorative motifs of West European Art Nouveau.

Austrian architecture critic Friedrich Achleitner lauded the structure for its rational ground plan and its contrasting, almost Baroque, abundance of decoration. He considered this layout noteworthy because it made the building easily adjustable.

The structure is dominated by a corner tower that resembles an inserted hinge, flanked by female figures holding globes. The interior features a vestibule decorated with floral stucco and reliefs of female figures in the staircase.

== Contemporary Artistic Activities ==
The building has been home to a varied exhibition program since 2014, where alternating arts projects are displayed via Wi-Fi in and around the Palais des Beaux Arts, for visitors using smartphones and tablets.

== Images ==
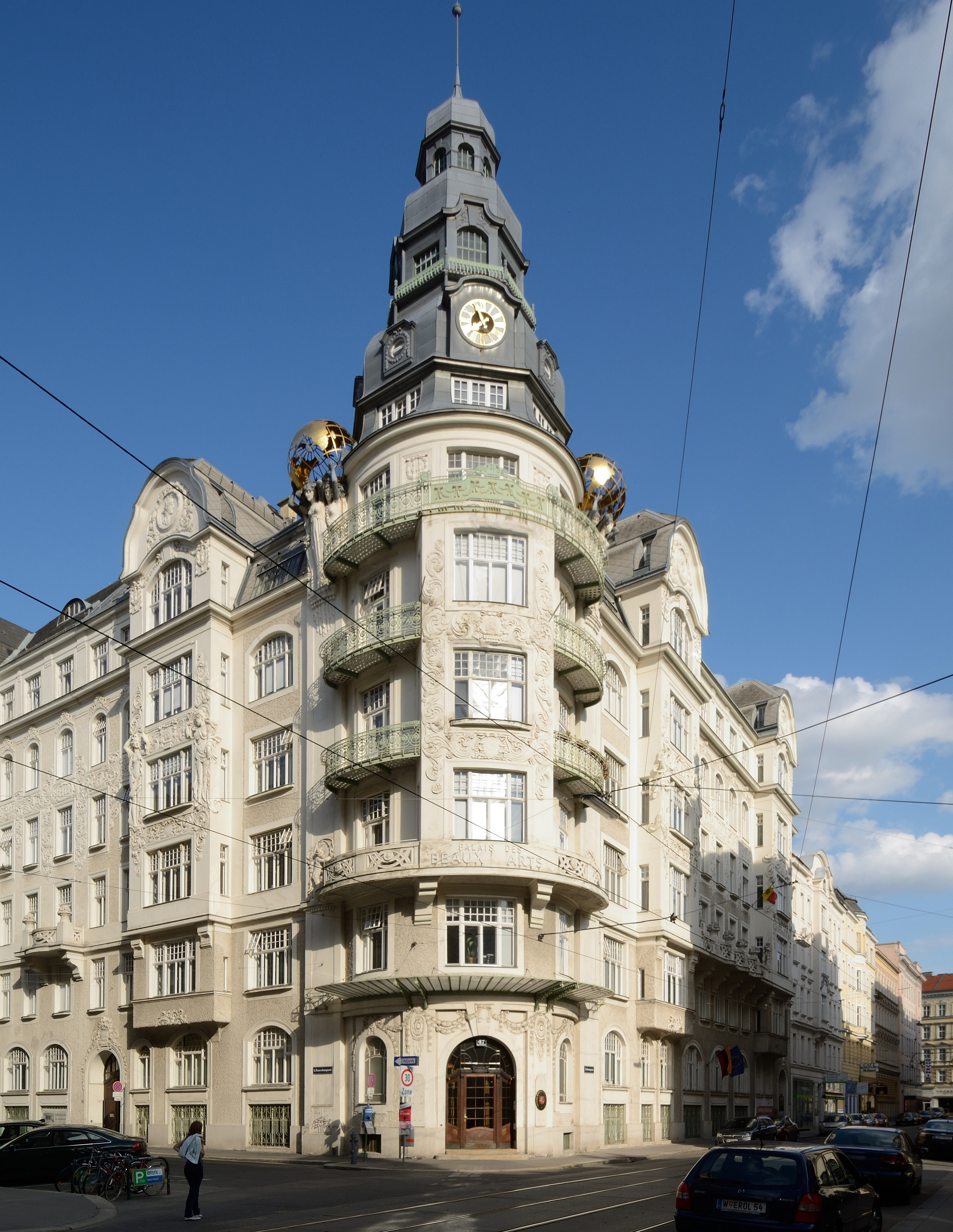
Palais des Beaux Arts, View of corner tower with main entrance

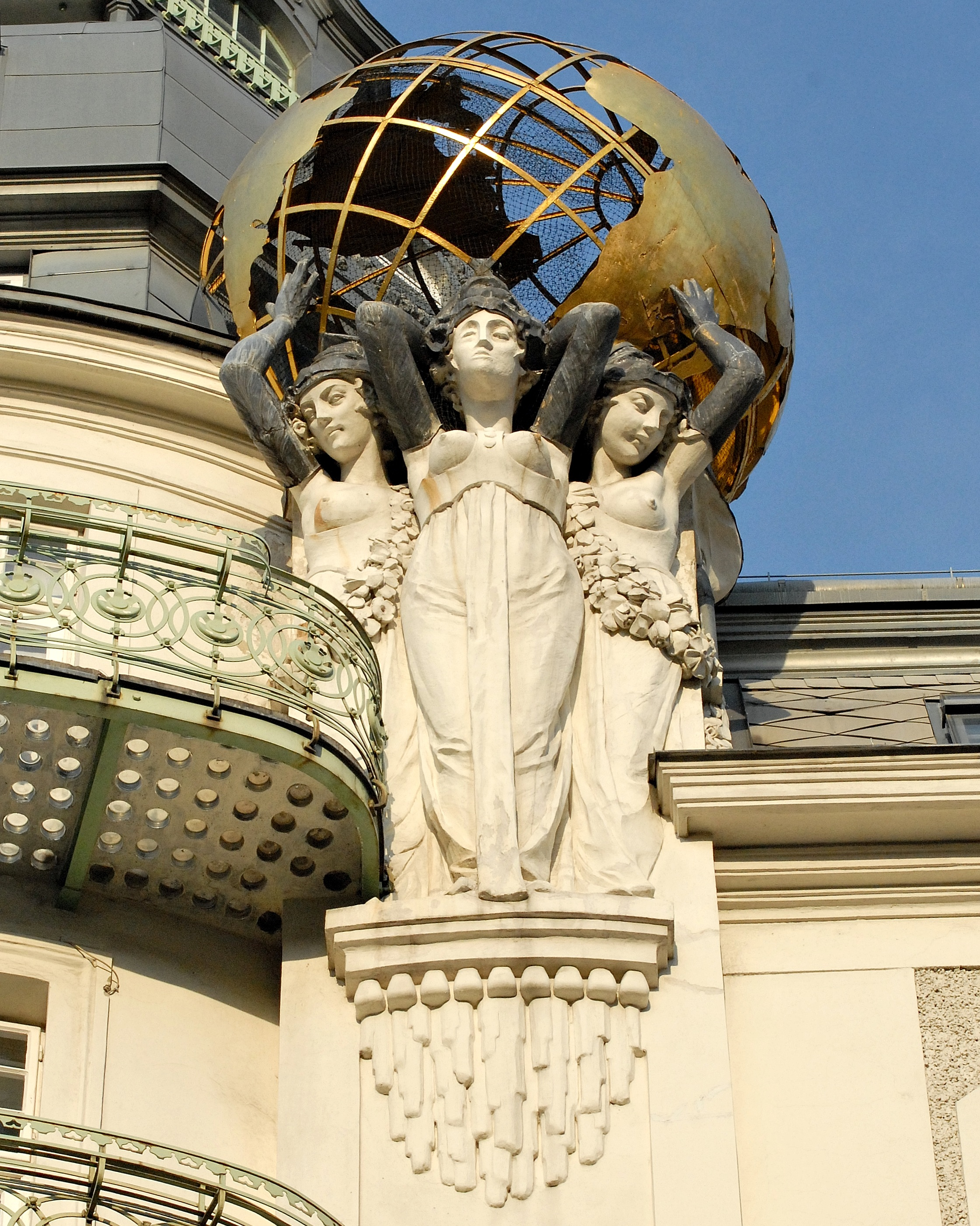
Figures with globe, Palais des Beaux Arts

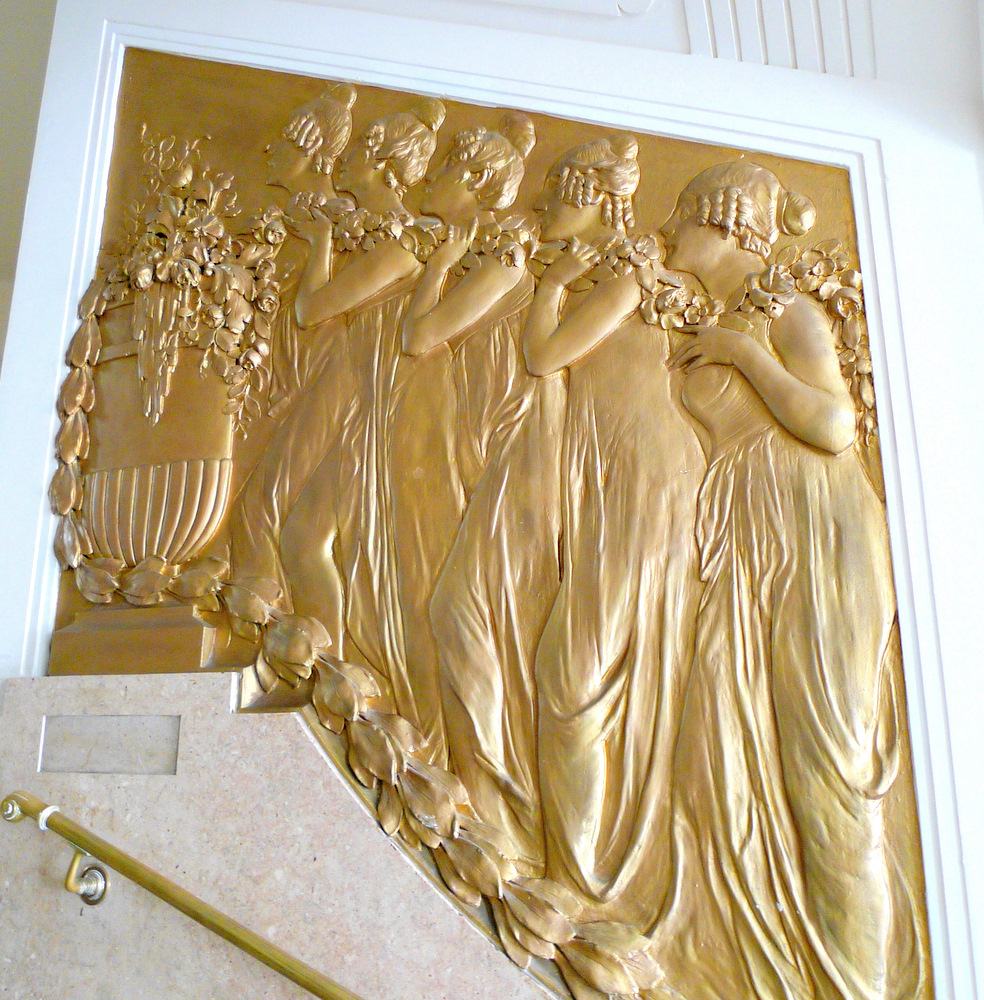
Relief of female figures, Vestibule, Palais des Beaux Arts

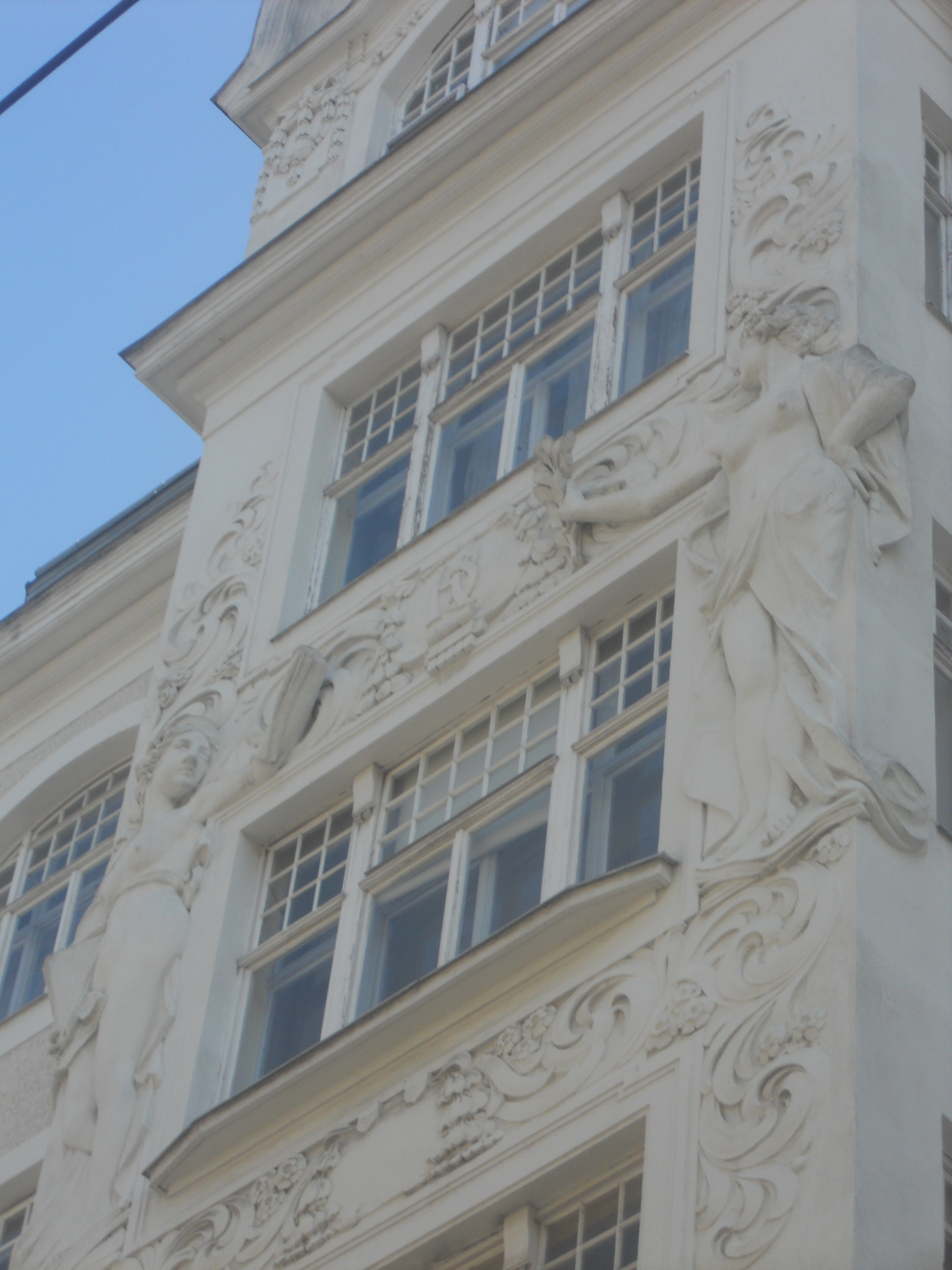
Detail of Paracelsusgasse façade, Palais des Beaux Arts

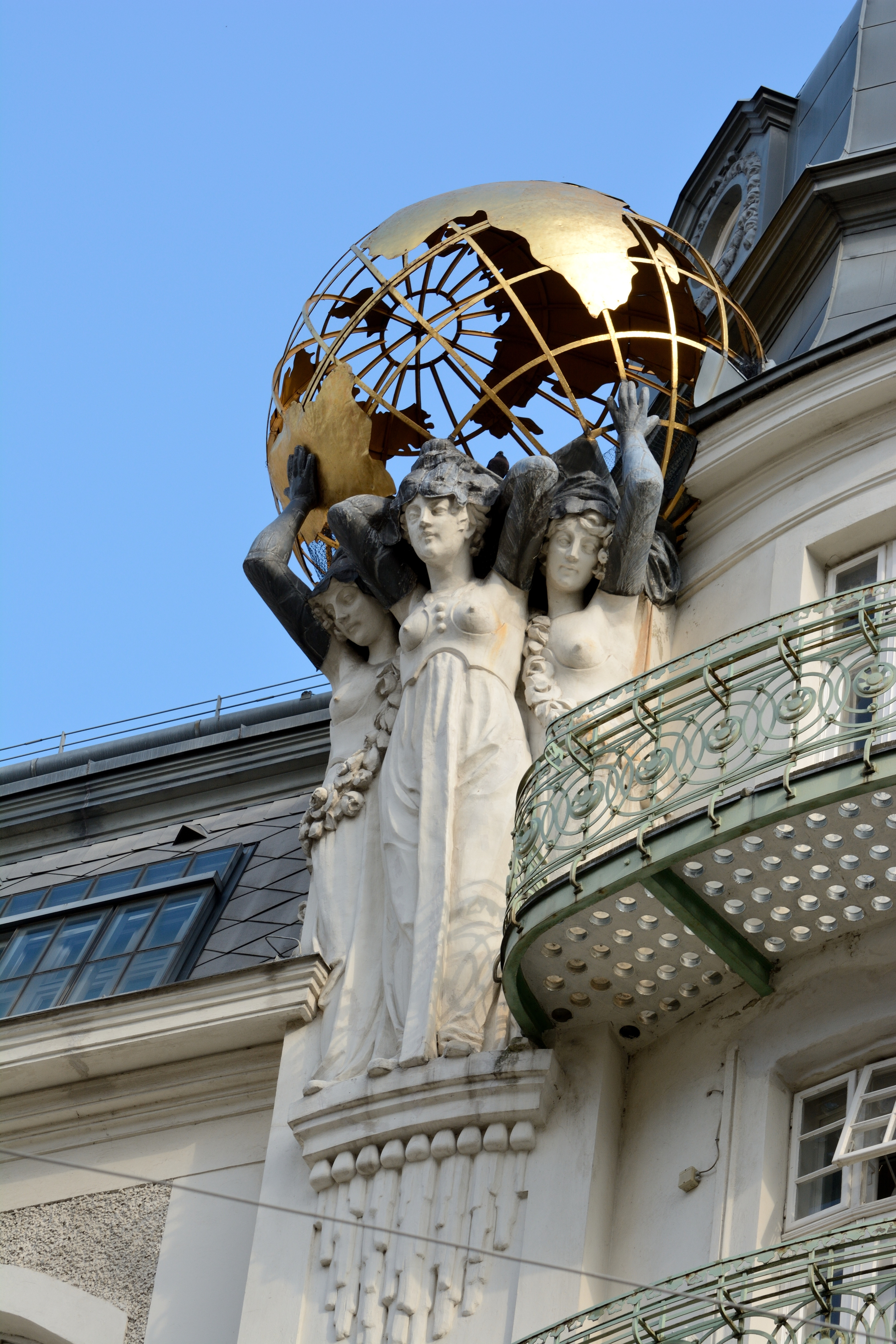
Group of figures on the north-western façade, Palais des Beaux Arts

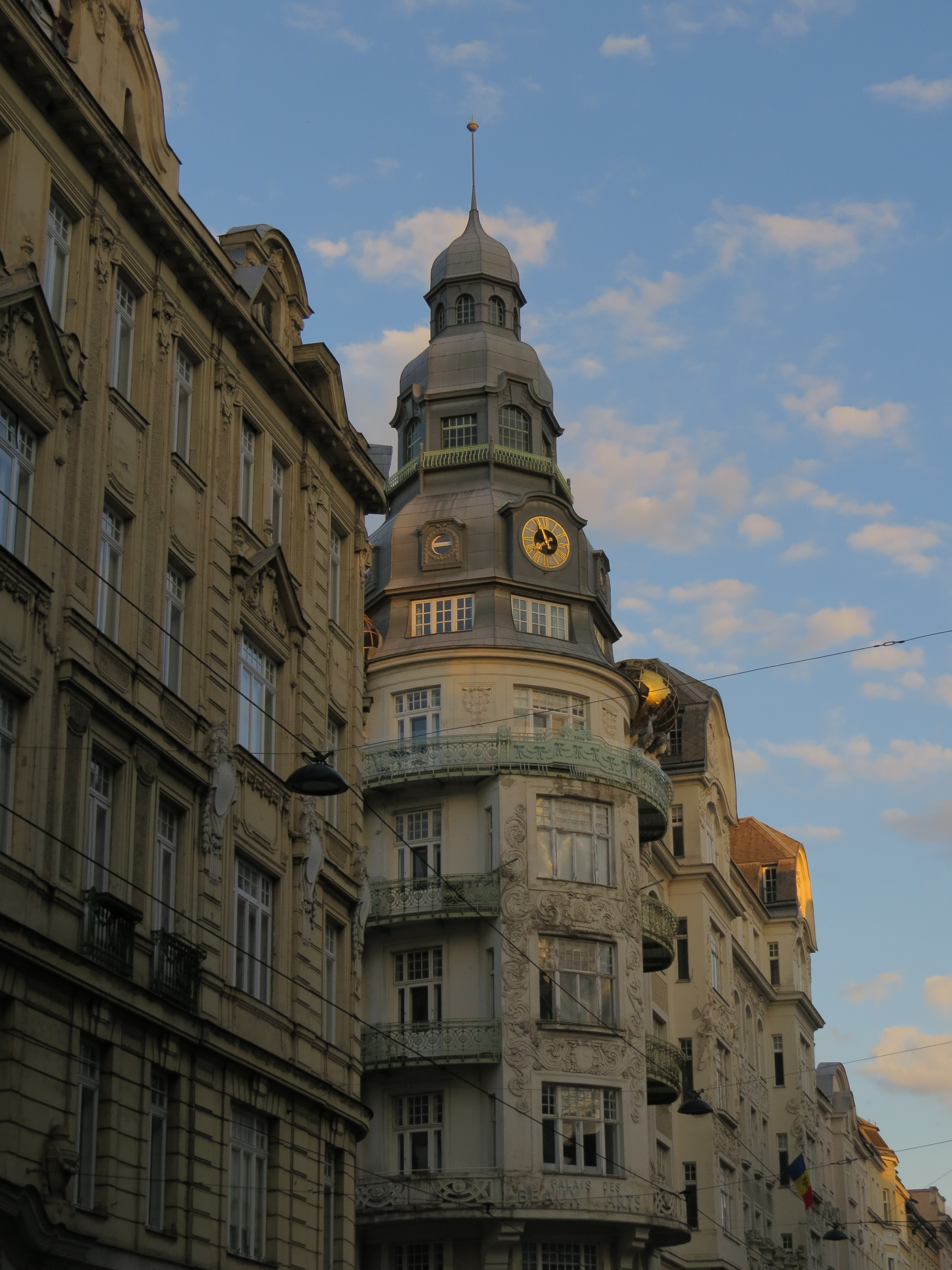
