= Alexander Rothaug =

Austrian painter and illustrator (1870–1946)

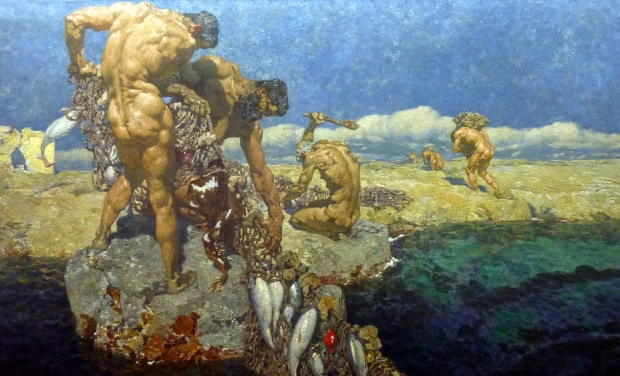
- The Fruits of the Sea (c. 1930), Jack Daulton Collection, Los Altos Hills, California.
- Born: March 13, 1870; Vienna, Austria-Hungary
- Died: March 5, 1946 (aged 75); Vienna, Austria
- Education: Academy of Fine Arts Vienna
- Occupations: Painter, illustrator
- Spouse: Ottilie Lauterkorn
- Parent(s): Theodor Rothaug and Karoline Rothaug

Alexander Rothaug (March 13, 1870 – March 5, 1946) was an Austrian painter and illustrator.

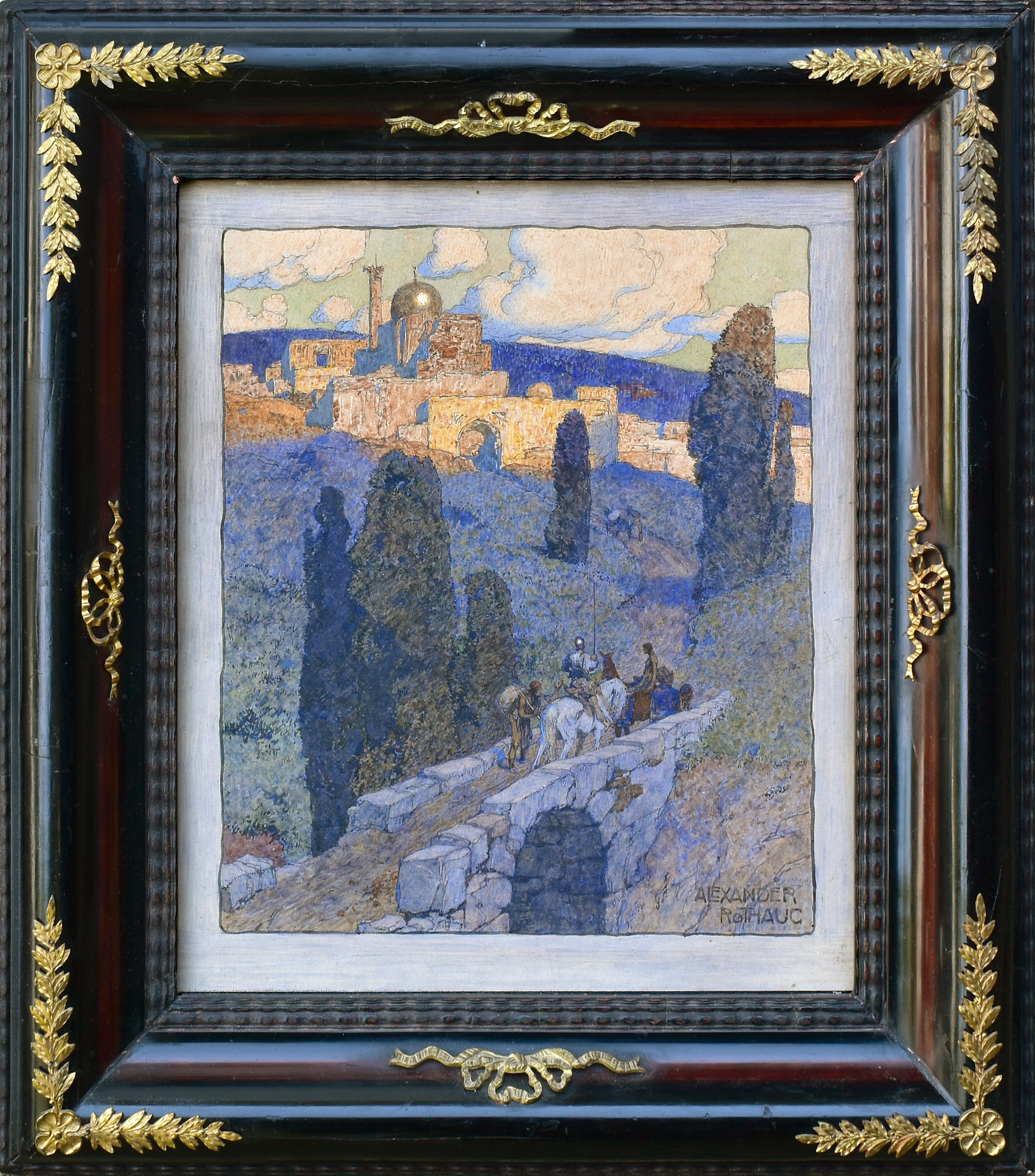
Alexander Rothaug – The City of Amberg

== Biography ==
Alexander Rothaug was born in Vienna in 1870 to Theodor Rothaug and Karoline Rothaug (née Vogel). His maternal ancestors were also painters and sculptors. He received his first painting lessons from his father, alongside his brother Leopold Rothaug, who was two years his senior.

In 1884, he began an apprenticeship as a sculptor with Johann Schindler (1822–1893), but in 1885 he transferred to the Academy of Fine Arts Vienna to study painting under August Eisenmenger, Christian Griepenkerl, and Franz Rumpler. The Orientalist painter Leopold Carl Müller was also a significant influence as an instructor, with whom Rothaug studied until Müller's death in 1892.

Rothaug moved to Munich in 1892, where he worked as an illustrator for the humorous magazine Fliegende Blätter. He married Ottilie Lauterkorn in 1896. He undertook study trips to Dalmatia, Italy, and the island of Rügen. In May 1910, he became a member of the Cooperative of Visual Artists of Vienna (Genossenschaft der bildenden Künstler Wiens). An extensive article on Rothaug appeared in the magazine Kunst-Revue in 1911. In 1912, he stayed in Mallorca at the invitation of Archduke Ludwig Salvator of Austria. Rothaug published the work Skizzen aus Miramar (Sketches from Miramar) based on this stay.

In 1933, Rothaug published a systematization of the human body regarding proportion theory titled Statik und Dynamik des menschlichen Körpers (Statics and Dynamics of the Human Body) as a loose-leaf collection of 10 plates. He also wrote a 38-page treatise titled Das Wissen in der Malerei (Knowledge in Painting) with a three-page appendix: Gedanken über die Kunst und den Künstler (Thoughts on Art and the Artist).

Rothaug was represented at the Great German Art Exhibition of 1938 in Munich with eight panel paintings, three of which were acquired by Adolf Hitler. His work Nessus, created in 1930 in Vienna (provenance: Belvedere Vienna), depicts an episode from the life of Hercules; like his general body of work, it was instrumentalized by the National Socialists for propaganda purposes, which caused him considerable difficulties after the war.

He is buried in an honorary grave at the Grinzing Cemetery (Group 15, Row 1, Number 2) in Vienna.

== Selected works ==
- 1934: Herzogbirbaum Parish Church: Ceiling painting in the nave as a medallion featuring Saints Mary, John the Baptist, and the Eucharist.

== Selected exhibitions ==
- 1900: Exhibition at the Royal Glass Palace in Munich; work shown: Zauberschlaf (Magic Sleep).
- 1909: 35th Annual Exhibition at the Künstlerhaus Wien (Vienna Artists' House); works shown: Waldfee (Forest Fairy) and Frühlingsreigen (Spring Dance).
- 1909: Autumn Exhibition at the Künstlerhaus Wien; works shown: Wies-Quelle and Psyche am Eingang zur Unterwelt (Psyche at the Entrance to the Underworld).
- 1911: Jubilee Exhibition of the Watercolor Club in Vienna.
- 1912: 27th Exhibition of the Watercolor Club in Vienna (December 1912 – January 1913).
- 1915: Exhibition of the four Viennese artist associations: Künstlerhaus, Secession, Hagenbund, and the Bund Österreichischer Künstler; work shown: Lethe.
- 1919: 33rd Exhibition of the Watercolor Club in Vienna.
- 1938: Great German Art Exhibition at the Haus der Kunst in Munich.
- 1941: Group exhibition at the Künstlerhaus Wien together with Maximilian Lenz, Johann Victor Krämer, Ernst Graner, and Gottlieb Theodor von Kempf.

== Awards ==
- 1888: Lampi Prize from the Academy of Fine Arts Vienna
- 1889: Golden Füger Medal from the Academy of Fine Arts Vienna
- 1890: Special School Prize from the Academy of Fine Arts Vienna
- 1890: Golden Franz Joseph Scholarship
- 1913: Baron Richard Drasche Honorary Prize
