= Vienna =

Capital and largest city of Austria

Vienna Wien (German) Wean (Bavarian)
- Capital city, state and municipality
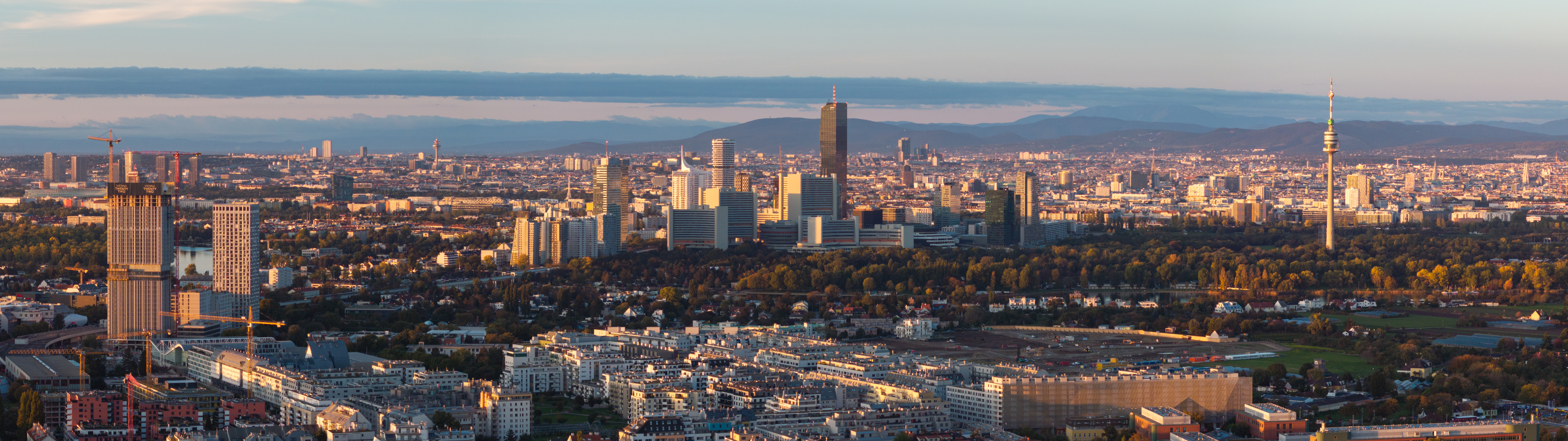
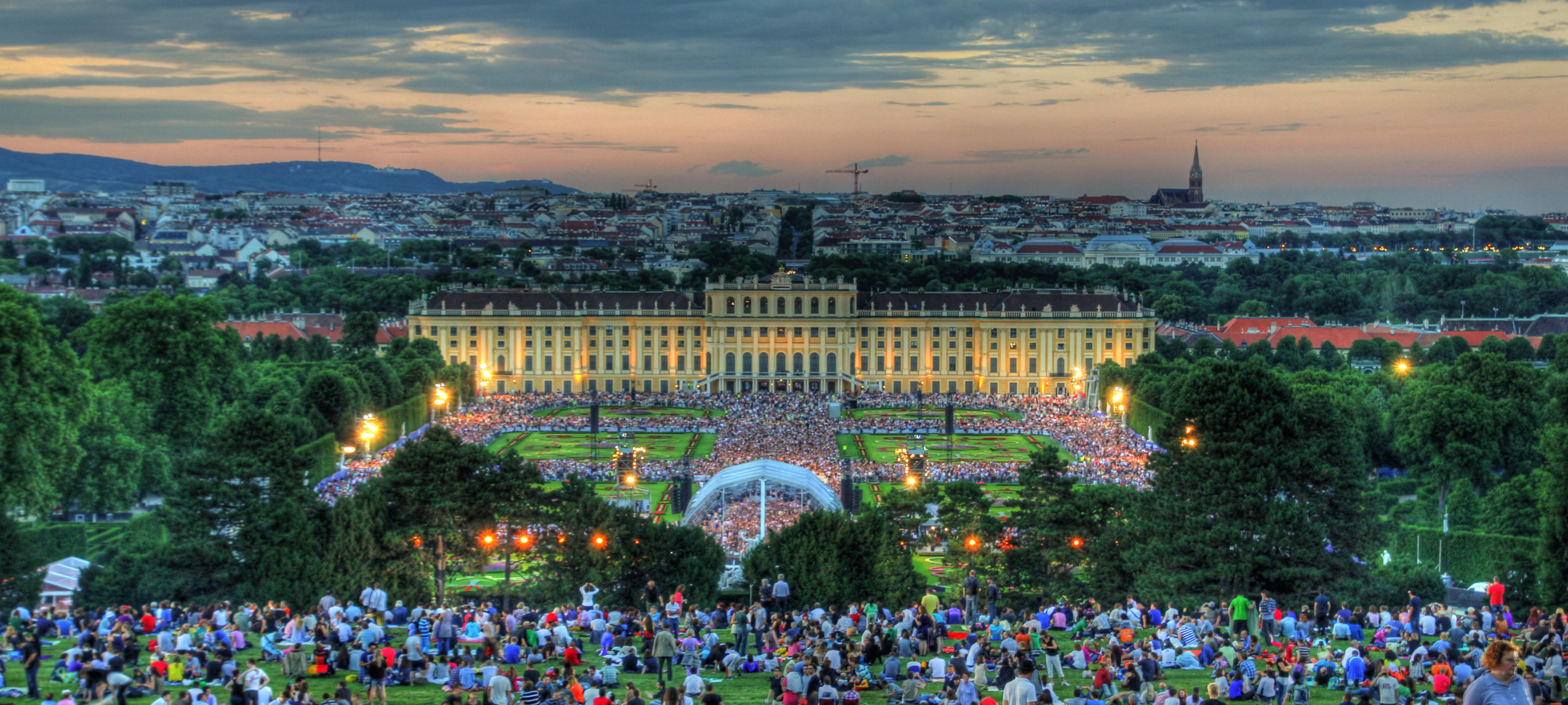
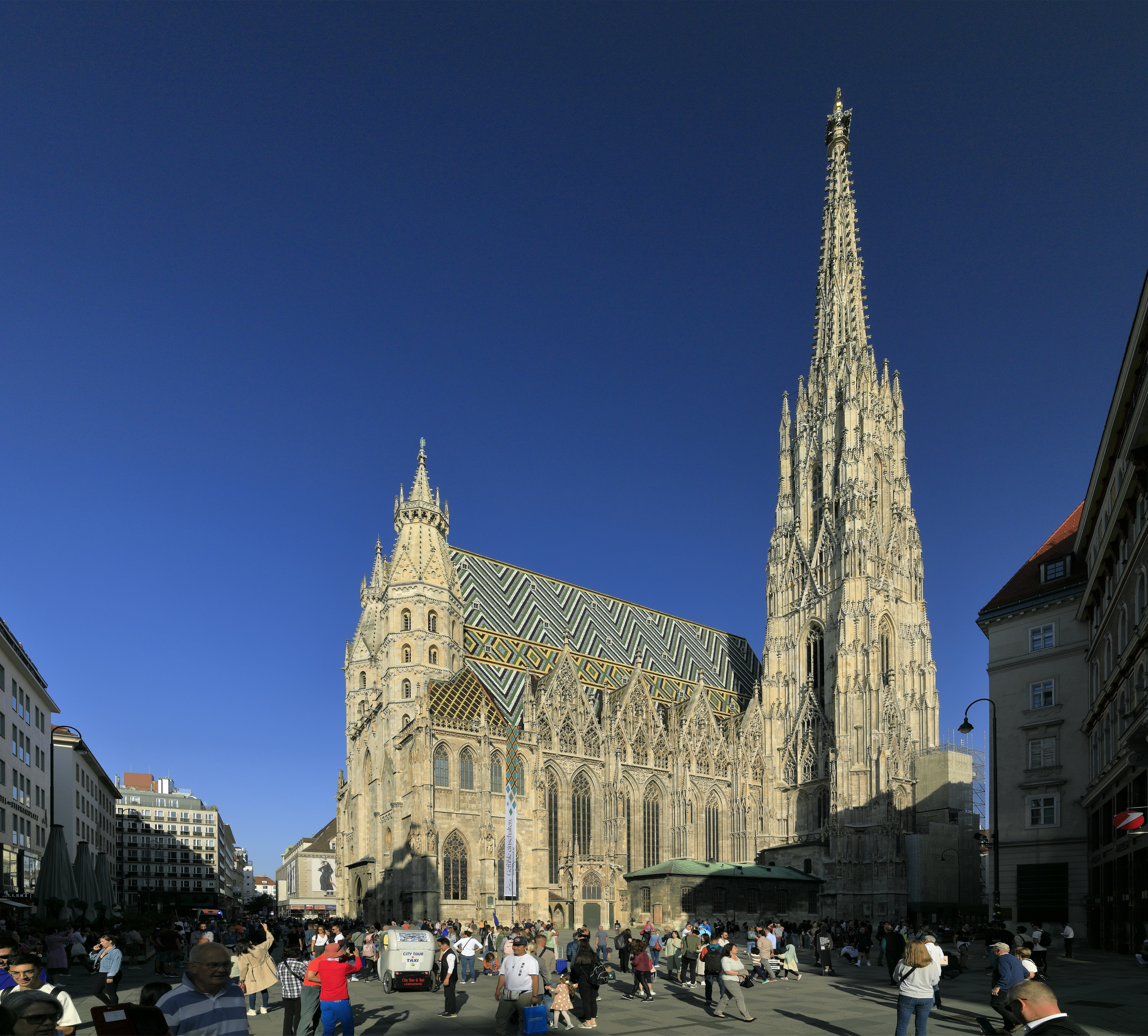
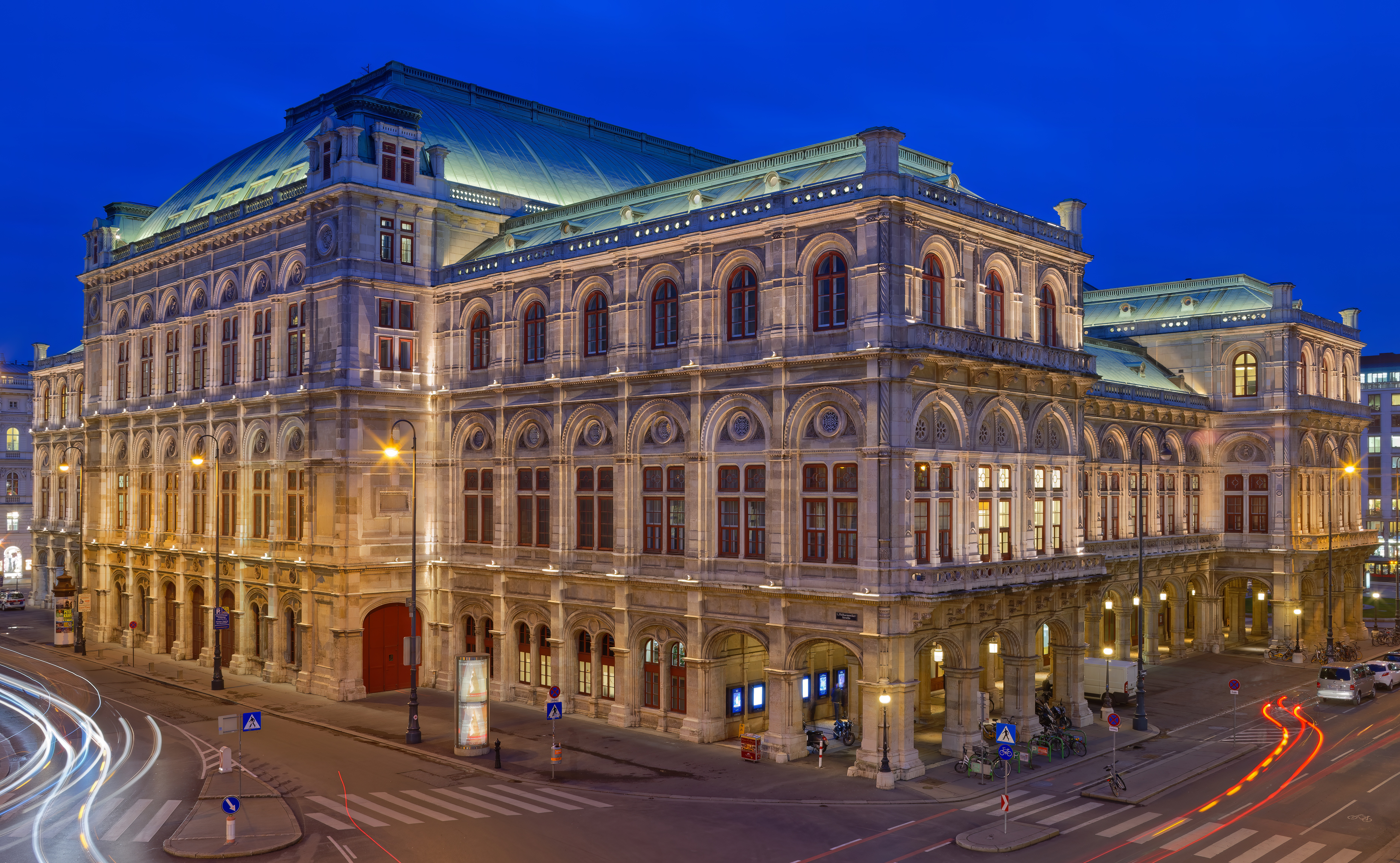
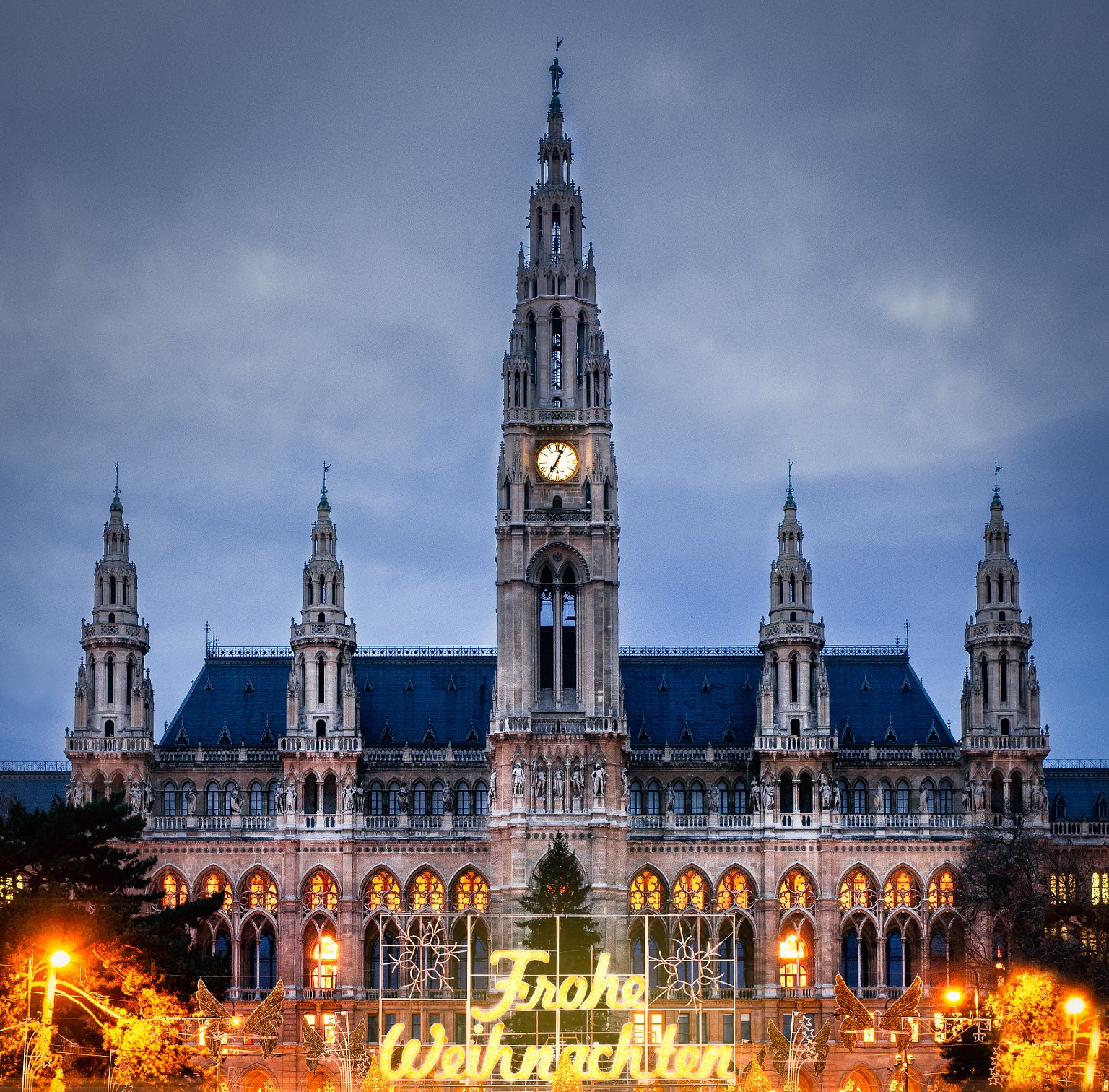
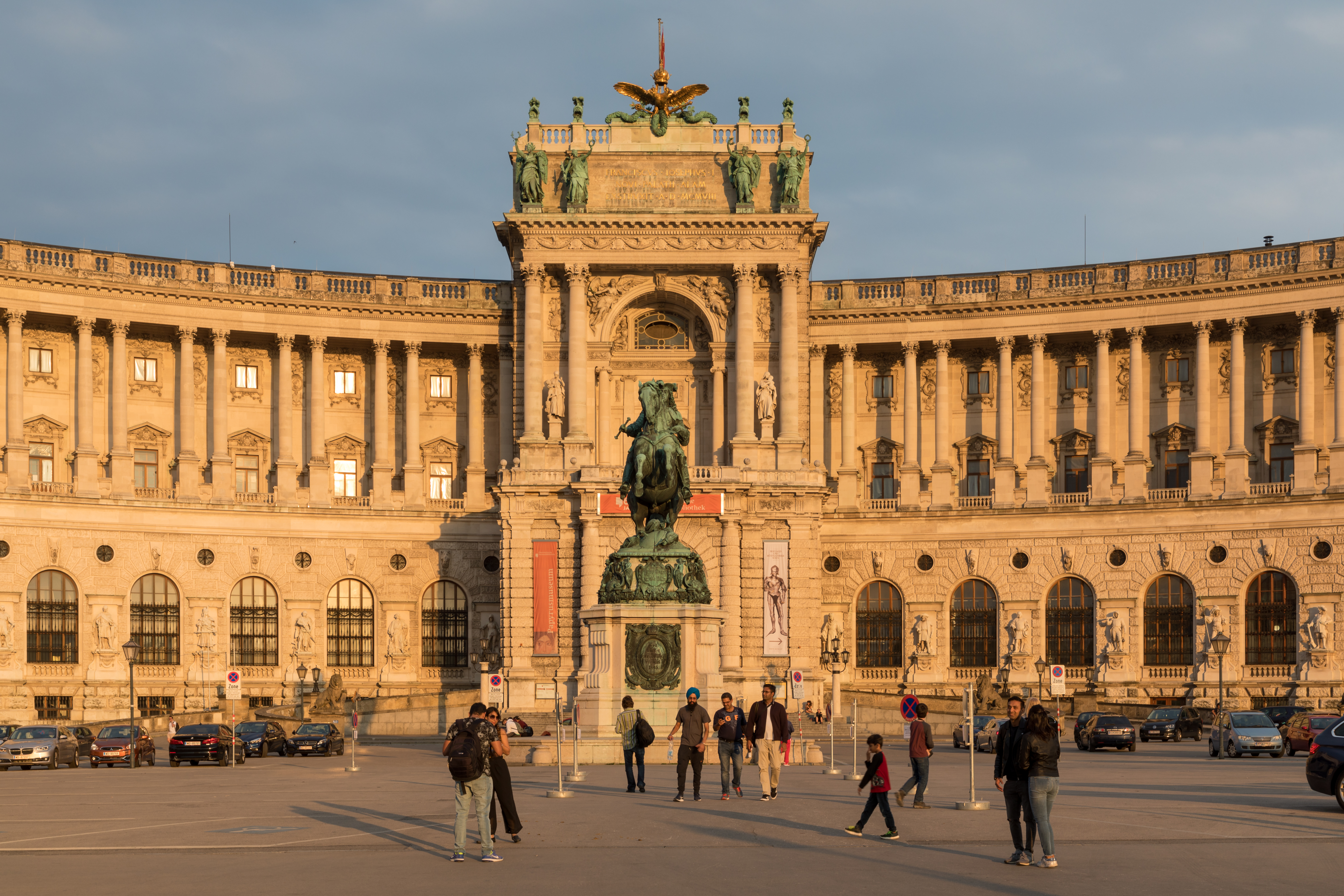
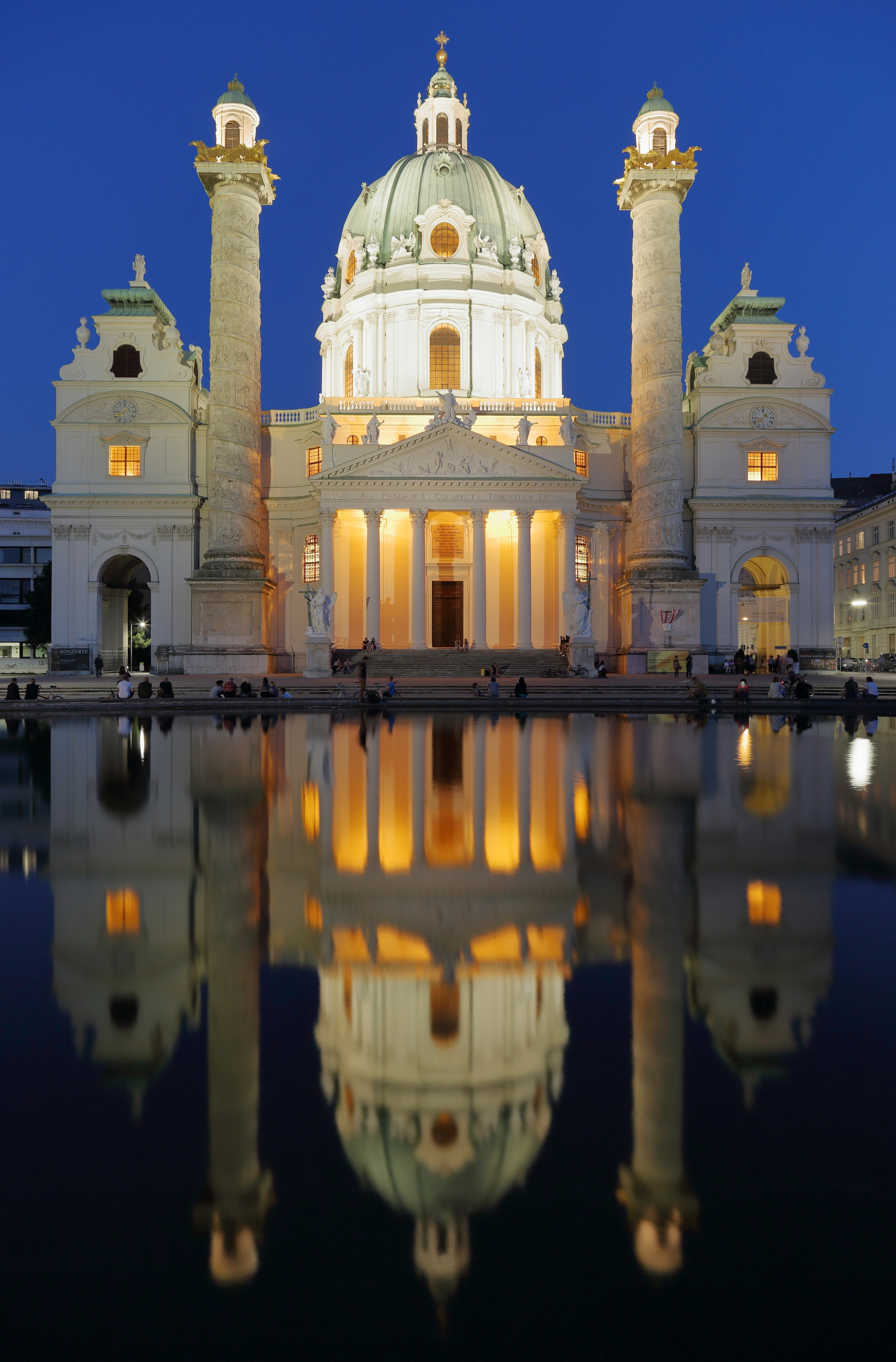
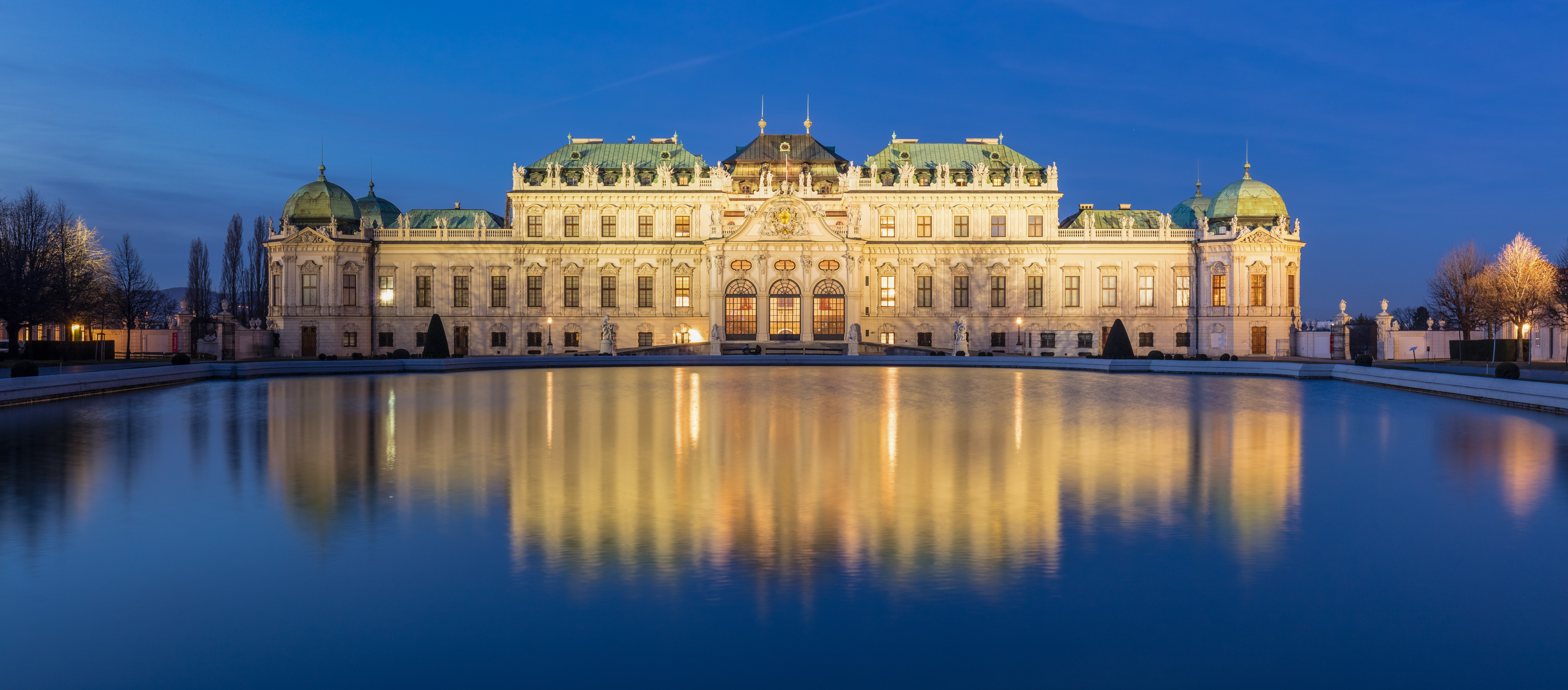
- Skyline of Vienna Schönbrunn Palace Stephansdom State Opera City Hall Neue Hofburg Karlskirche Upper Belvedere

- Flag Seal Coat of arms Logo
- Interactive map of Vienna
- Location within Austria Location within Europe
- Coordinates: 48°12′30″N 16°22′21″E
- Country: Austria
- State: Vienna

Government
  - Body: State and Municipality
  - Mayor and Governor: Michael Ludwig (SPÖ)

Area
  - Total: 414.78 km^{2} (160.15 sq mi)
  - Land: 395.25 km^{2} (152.61 sq mi)
  - Water: 19.39 km^{2} (7.49 sq mi)
- Elevation: 151–542 m (495–1,778 ft)

Population (2025)
  - Total: 2,028,499
  - Rank: 10th in Europe; 1st in Austria
  - Density: 4,890.5/km^{2} (12,666/sq mi)
  - Urban: 2,223,236 ("Kernzone")
  - Metro: 2,890,577
  - Ethnicity: 48.7% Austrian; 51.3% other
- Demonyms: German: Wiener (m), Wienerin (f); Viennese

GDP
  - Total: €124.868 billion (2024)
  - Per capita: €61,572 (2024)
- Time zone: UTC+01:00 (CET)
  - Summer (DST): UTC+02:00 (CEST)
- Postal code: 1xx0 (xx = district number); 1300 (airport); 1400 (United Nations); other 1yyy (postal boxes)
- ISO 3166 code: AT-9
- Vehicle registration: W
- Vehicle registration: W
- HDI (2022): 0.948 very high · 1st of 9
- Seats in the Federal Council: 10 / 60
- GeoTLD: .wien
- Website: wien.gv.at (in German)

UNESCO World Heritage Site
- Official name: Historic Centre of Vienna
- Type: Cultural
- Criteria: ii, iv, vi
- Designated: 2001 (25th session)
- Reference no.: 1033
- Area: 371 ha
- UNESCO Region: Europe and North America
- Endangered: 2017–2026

Vienna (/viˈɛnə/ vee-EN-ə; German: Wien [viːn]; Austro-Bavarian: Wean [veɐ̯n]) is the capital, most populous city, and one of the nine states of Austria. It is Austria's primate city, with just over two million inhabitants. Its larger metropolitan area has a population of nearly 2.9 million, representing nearly one-third of the country's population. Vienna is the cultural, economic, and political centre of the country, the fifth-largest city by population in the European Union, and the most populous of the cities on the river Danube.

The city lies on the eastern edge of the Vienna Woods (Wienerwald), the northeasternmost foothills of the Alps, that separate Vienna from the more western parts of Austria, at the transition to the Pannonian Basin. It sits on the Danube, and is traversed by the highly regulated Wienfluss (Vienna River). Vienna is completely surrounded by Lower Austria, and lies around 50 km (31 mi) west of Slovakia and its capital Bratislava, 50 km (31 mi) northwest of Hungary, and 60 km (37 mi) south of Moravia (Czech Republic).

The Romans founded a castrum at Vienna, which they called Vindobona, in the 1st century, when the region belonged to the province of Pannonia. It was elevated to a municipium with Roman city rights in 212. This was followed by a time in the sphere of influence of the Lombards and later the Pannonian Avars, when Slavs formed the majority of the region's population. From the 8th century on, the region was settled by the Baiuvarii. In 1155, Vienna became the seat of the Babenbergs, who ruled Austria from 976 to 1246. In 1221, Vienna was granted city rights. During the 16th century, the Habsburgs, who had succeeded the Babenbergs, established Vienna as the seat of the emperors of the Holy Roman Empire, a position it held until the empire's dissolution in 1806, with only a brief interruption. With the formation of the Austrian Empire in 1804, Vienna became the capital of it and all its successor states.

Throughout the modern era, Vienna has been among the largest German-speaking cities in the world. It was the largest in the 18th and 19th centuries, peaking at two million inhabitants before it was overtaken by Berlin at the beginning of the 20th century. Vienna is host to many major international organizations, including the United Nations, OPEC and the Organization for Security and Co-operation in Europe. In 2001, the city centre was designated a UNESCO World Heritage Site. It was listed as endangered from July 2017 to July 2026.

Vienna is renowned for its rich musical heritage, having been home to many celebrated classical composers, including Ludwig van Beethoven, Johannes Brahms, Anton Bruckner, Joseph Haydn, Gustav Mahler, Wolfgang Amadeus Mozart, Arnold Schoenberg, Franz Schubert, Johann Strauss I, and Johann Strauss II. It played a pivotal role as a leading European music centre, from the age of Viennese Classicism through the early part of the 20th century. The city was home to the world's first psychoanalyst, Sigmund Freud. The historic centre of Vienna is rich in architectural ensembles, including Baroque palaces and gardens, and the late-19th-century Ringstrasse, which is lined with grand buildings, monuments and parks.

== Etymology and exonyms ==
Vienna was known to the Romans as Vindobona, a borrowing of a Celtic toponym meaning either "white place" or "place of Vindos" (a personal name). This name disappeared from the record after the 6th century, occurring for the last time in Jordanes's Getica. The German name for the city, Wien – of which Vienna is a Latinised form – is unrelated, deriving from the River Wien (compare Steyr, Enns, and Krems, which all take their names from the rivers whose mouths they lie at). It occurs for the first time in the Salzburg Annals, which note that a battle was fought at a place named Wenia in the year 881. The name may ultimately mean "forest river", from Celtic *Vedunia.

Bécs, the Hungarian name for Vienna (borrowed into Serbo-Croatian as Beč and into Ottoman Turkish as Beç), probably derives from a word meaning "kiln", and may date from a period in the 10th century when the region came under temporary Hungarian domination. In Romanian, the city is now called Viena, but the archaic names Beci and Beciu were used in chronicles. Romanian still has beci in use, a common noun meaning "cellar"; linguist Dan Alexe states both it and the aforementioned names of Vienna are believed to ultimately be derived from a word of the Turkic-speaking Avars, originally meaning "fortified place" or "treasury".

In Slovene, the city is called Dunaj, which in other Slavic languages denotes the River Danube.

In the Bavarian dialect of eastern Austria, the city is called Wean; however, this name is hardly used to any significant extent in the local city dialect (Viennese German) anymore.

== History ==
=== Prehistory ===
The area of Vienna was inhabited by modern humans already from the Upper Palaeolithic period (37.000–38.500BC) as excavations have found man made cuts in animal bones.

=== Roman period ===
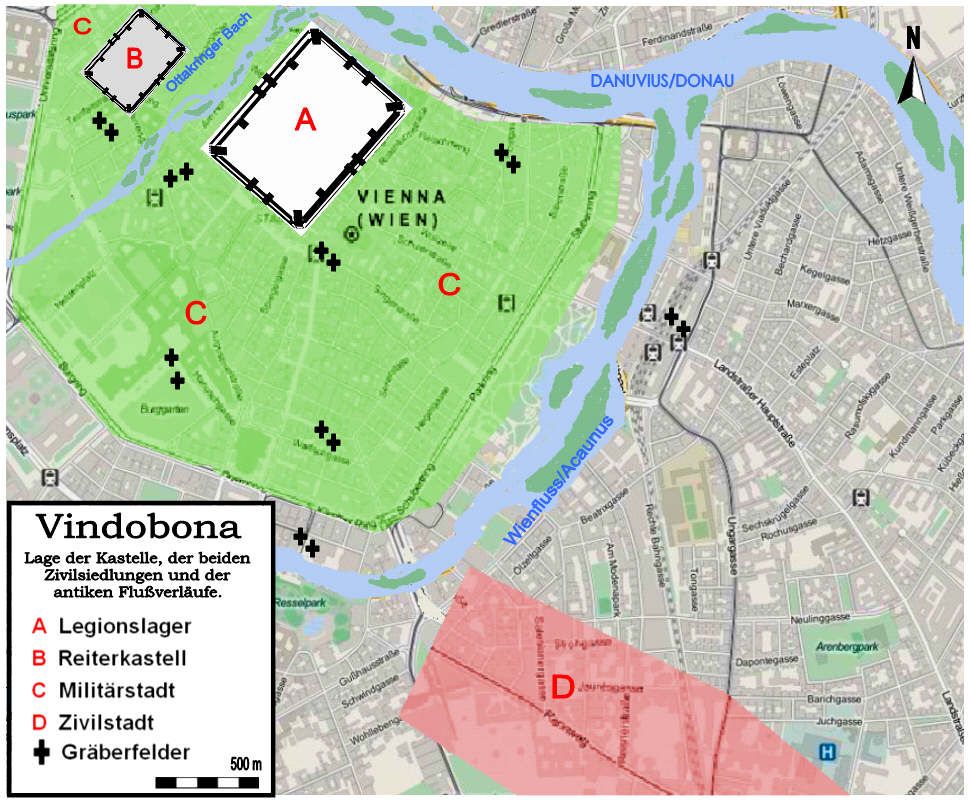
Roman Vienna

In the 1st century, the Romans set up the military camp of Vindobona in Pannonia on the site of today's Vienna city centre near the Danube with an adjoining civilian town to secure the borders of the Roman Empire. Construction of the legionary camp began around AD 97. At its peak, Vindobona had a population of around 15,000 people. It was a part of a trade and communications network across the Empire. Roman emperor Marcus Aurelius may have died here in AD 180 during a campaign against the Marcomanni.

After a Germanic invasion in the second century, the city was rebuilt. It served as a seat of the Roman government until the fifth century, when the population fled due to the Huns invasion of Pannonia. The city was abandoned for several centuries.

Evidence of the Romans in the city is plentiful. Remains of the military camp have been found under the city, as well as fragments of the canal system and figurines.

=== Middle Ages and early modern period ===
Irish Benedictines established monastic settlements in the 12th century; evidence of these connections includes the Schottenstift ("Scots Abbey") in Vienna, originally home to a community of Irish monks.

In 976, Leopold I of Babenberg was appointed Margrave of the Eastern March, a frontier district of Bavaria centred along the Danube. This march gradually expanded eastward under successive Babenberg rulers, eventually evolving into the Duchy of Austria and incorporating Vienna and its surrounding areas. In 1155, Henry II, Duke of Austria, relocated the Babenberg residence from Klosterneuburg in Lower Austria to Vienna, coinciding with the founding of the Schottenstift. Following this relocation, Vienna became the permanent residence of the Babenberg dynasty. Vienna was occupied by Kingdom of Hungary forces between 1485 and 1490.

Around the beginning of the 16th century, Vienna became the seat of the Aulic Council, the central advisory body to the Holy Roman Emperor. Vienna served as the residence of the Habsburg emperors during their reigns from 1611 to 1740 and again from 1745 until the dissolution of the Holy Roman Empire in 1806.

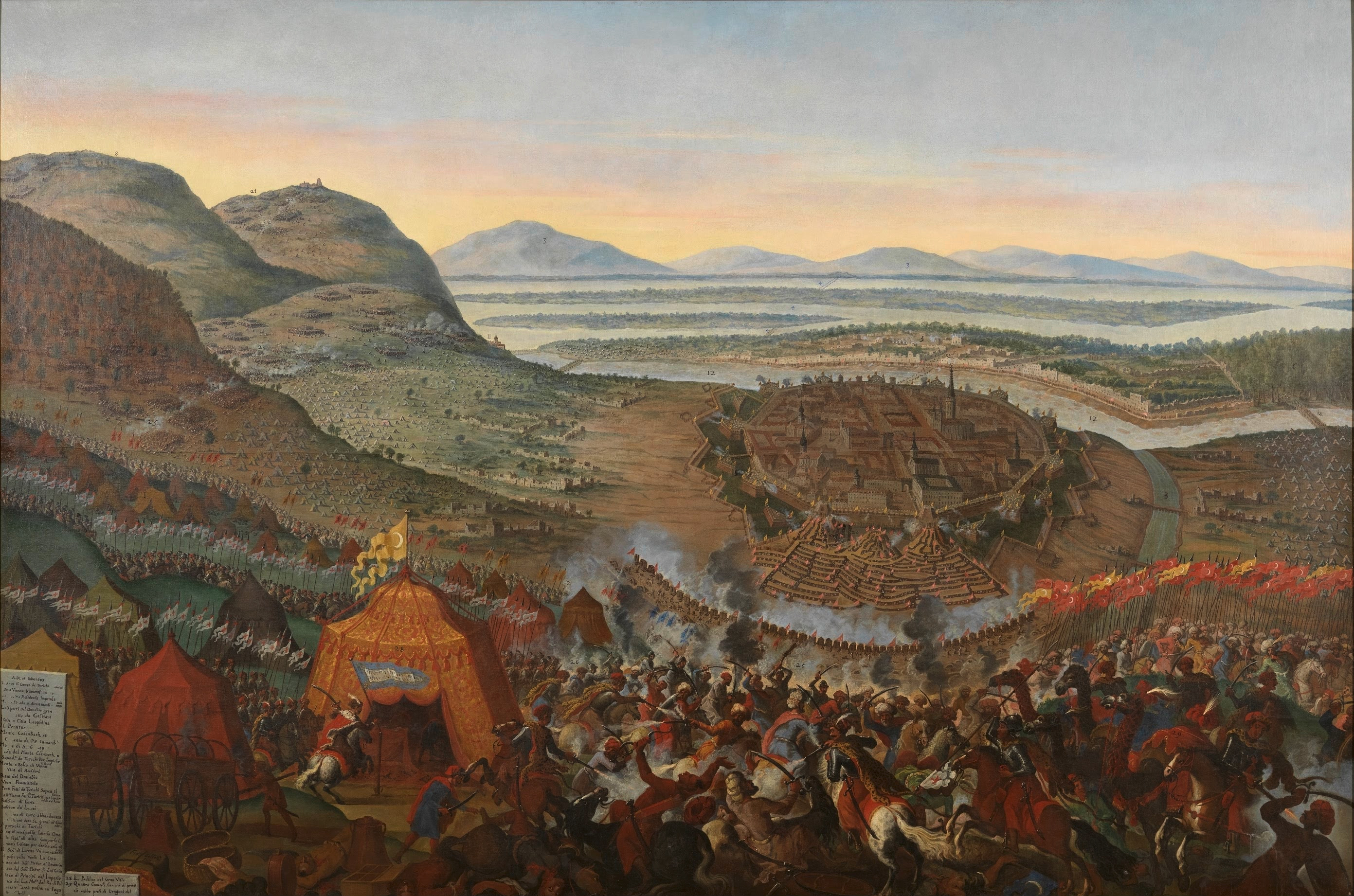
The Siege of Vienna in 1683, by Frans Geffels

In the 16th and 17th centuries, Ottoman forces advanced toward Vienna on two notable occasions: the Siege of Vienna in 1529 and the Battle of Vienna in 1683, both of which resulted in the city's successful defence. In 1679, the Great Plague of Vienna severely afflicted the city; nearly one-third of its inhabitants died of the Bubonic plague.

=== Austrian Empire and early 20th century ===
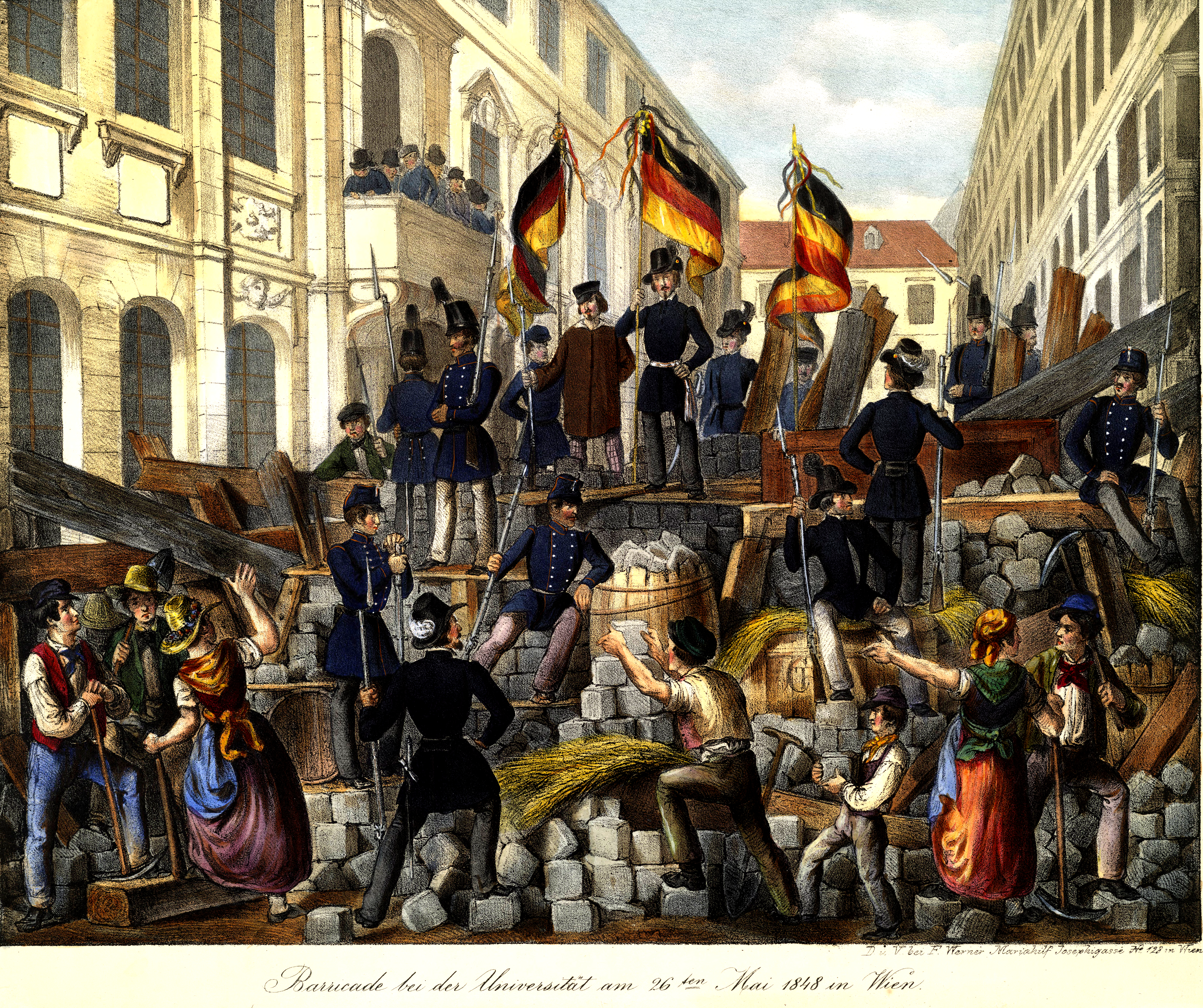
Revolutionaries in Vienna with German tricolour flags, 1848

In 1804, during the Napoleonic Wars, Vienna became the capital of the newly formed Austrian Empire. The city continued to play a major role in European and world politics, including hosting the Congress of Vienna in 1814–15. The city also saw major uprisings against Habsburg rule in 1848, which were suppressed. After the Austro-Hungarian Compromise of 1867, Vienna remained the capital of what became the Austro-Hungarian Empire. The city functioned as a centre of classical music, for which the title of the First Viennese School (Haydn/Mozart/Beethoven) is sometimes applied. During the latter half of the 19th century, Vienna developed what had previously been the bastions and glacis into the Ringstraße, a new boulevard surrounding the historical town and a major prestige project. Former suburbs were incorporated, and the city of Vienna grew dramatically. In 1918, after World War I, Vienna became the capital of the Republic of German-Austria, and then in 1919 of the First Republic of Austria.

From the late-19th century to 1938, the city remained a centre of high culture and of modernism. A world capital of music, Vienna played host to composers such as Johannes Brahms, Anton Bruckner, Gustav Mahler, and Richard Strauss. The city's cultural contributions in the first half of the 20th century included, among many, the Vienna Secession movement in art, the Second Viennese School, the architecture of Adolf Loos, the philosophy of Ludwig Wittgenstein, and the Vienna Circle.

=== Red Vienna ===
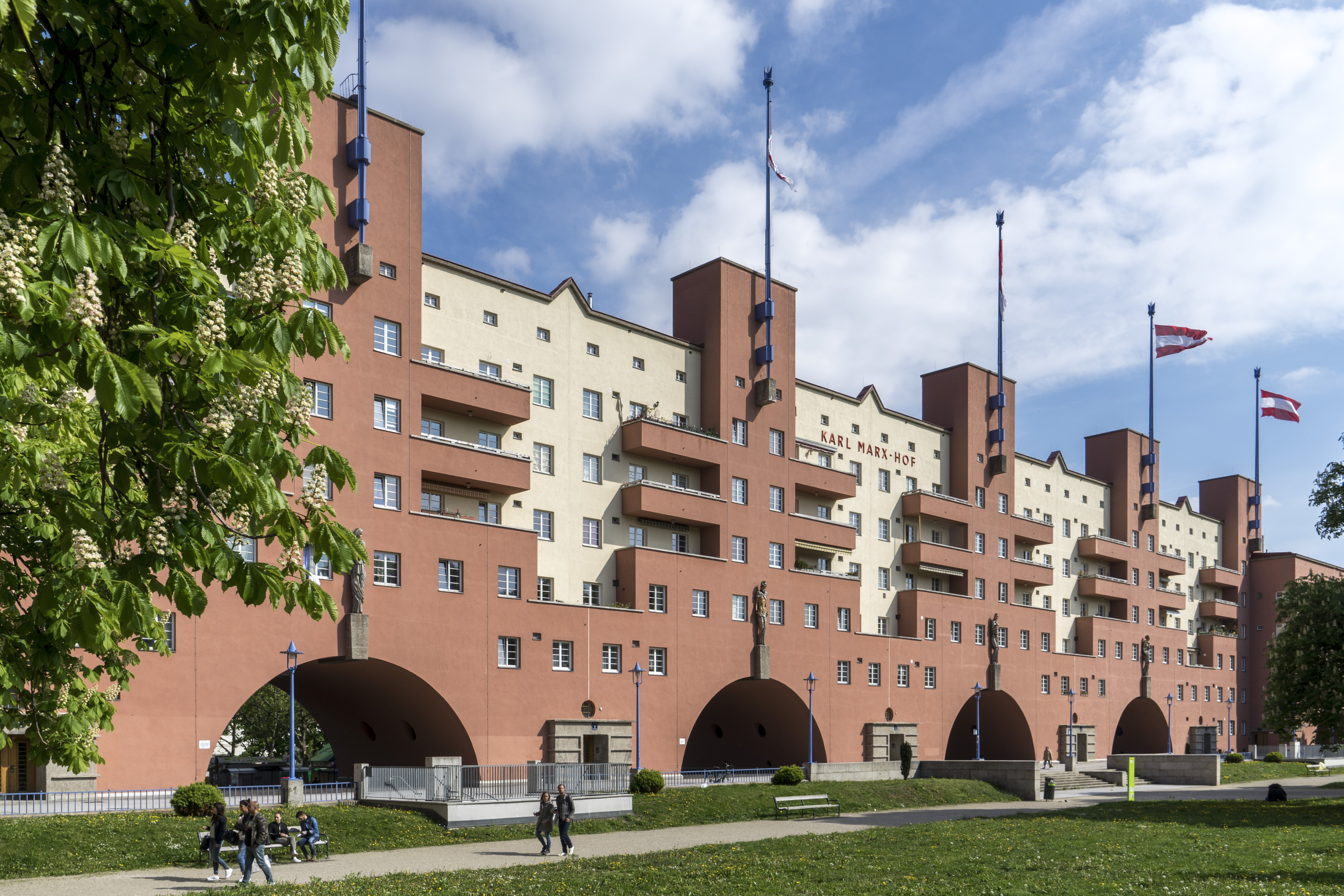
Karl-Marx-Hof, a Gemeindebau building and a symbol of Red Vienna

The city of Vienna became the centre of socialist politics from 1919 to 1934, a period referred to as Red Vienna (Das rote Wien). After a new breed of socialist politicians won the local elections, they engaged in a brief but ambitious municipal experiment. Social democrats had won an absolute majority in the May 1919 municipal election and commanded the city council with 100 of the 165 seats. Jakob Reumann was appointed by the city council as city mayor. The theoretical foundations of so-called Austromarxism were established by Otto Bauer, Karl Renner, and Max Adler.

Red Vienna is perhaps most well known for its Gemeindebauten, public housing buildings. Between 1925 and 1934, over 60,000 new apartments were built in the Gemeindebauten. Apartments were assigned based on a point system favoring families and less affluent citizens.

=== July Revolt and Civil War ===
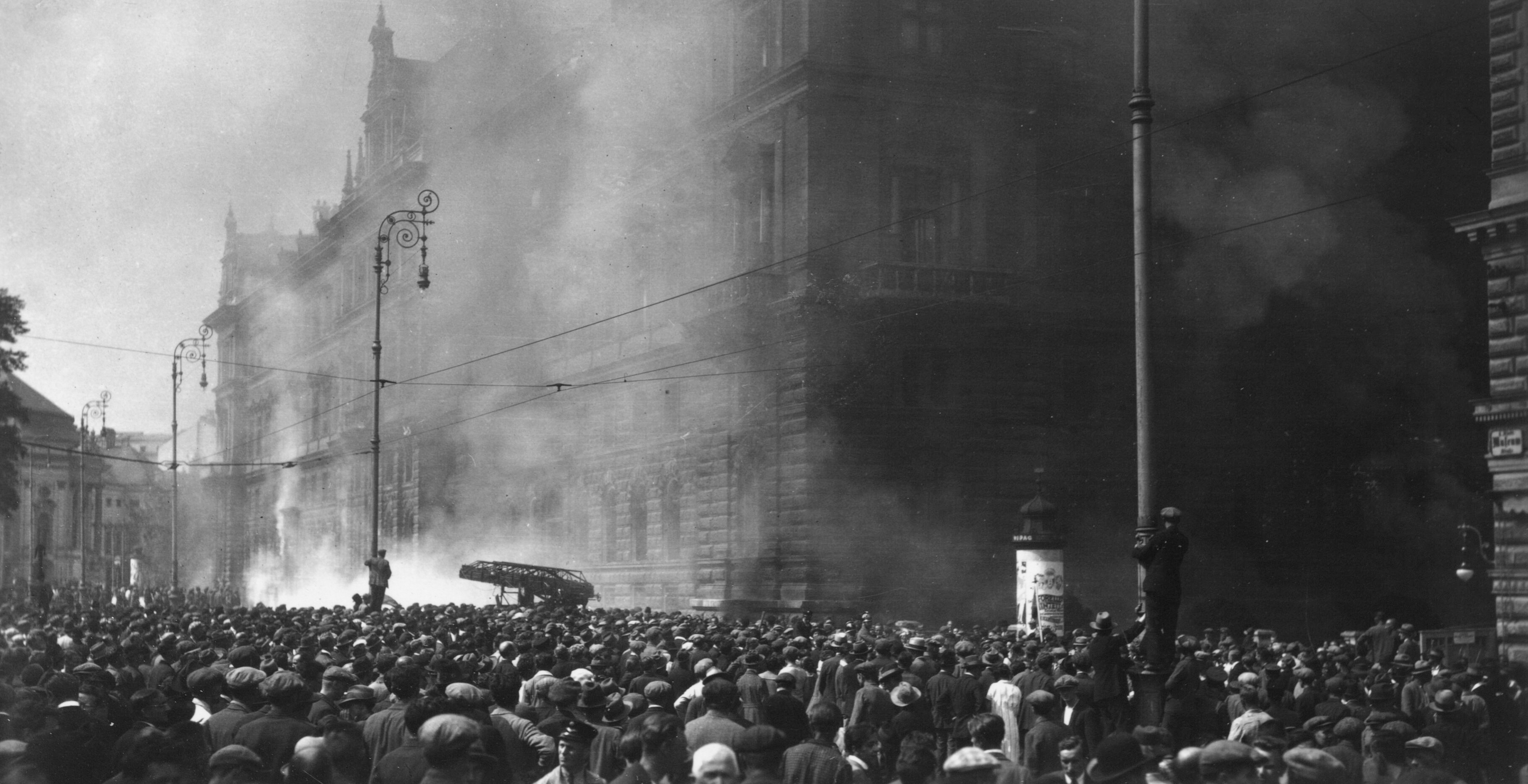
The Palace of Justice burning, 1927

In July 1927, after three nationalist far-right paramilitary members were acquitted of the killing of two social democratic Republikanischer Schutzbund members, a riot broke out in the city. The protestors, enraged by the decision, set the Palace of Justice ablaze. The police attempted to end the revolt with force and killed at least 84 protestors, with 5 policemen also dying. In 1933, right-wing Chancellor Engelbert Dollfuss dissolved the parliament, essentially letting him run the country as a dictatorship, banned the Communist Party and severely limited the influence of the Social Democratic Party. This led to a civil war between the right-wing government and socialist forces the following year, which started in Linz and quickly spread to Vienna. Socialist members of the Republikanischer Schutzbund barricaded themselves inside the housing estates and exchanged fire with the police and paramilitary groups. The fighting in Vienna ended after the Austrian Armed Forces shelled the Karl-Marx-Hof, a civilian housing estate, and the Schutzbund surrendered.

=== Anschluss and World War II ===
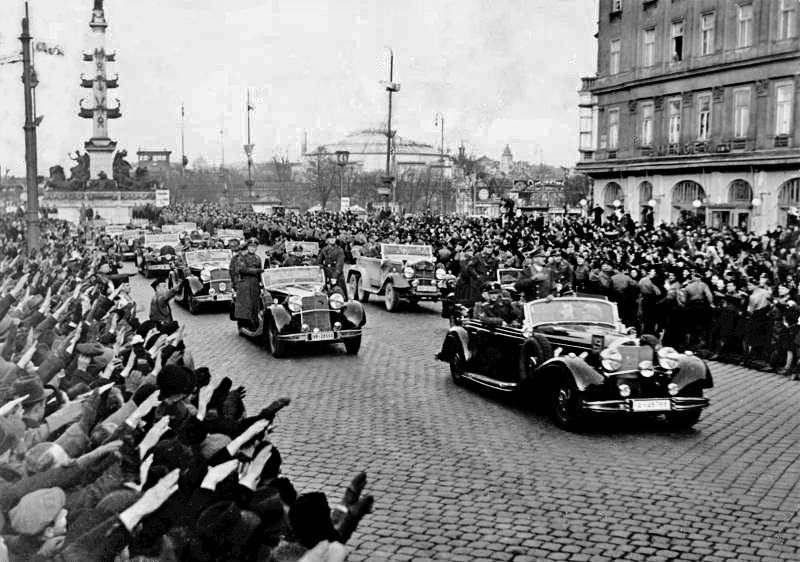
Crowds greet German Chancellor Adolf Hitler as he rides in an open car in Vienna following the March 1938 annexation of Austria by Nazi Germany.

On 15 March 1938, three days after German troops first entered Austria, Adolf Hitler arrived in Vienna. 200,000 Austrians greeted him at the Heldenplatz, where he delivered a speech from a balcony of the Neue Burg, announcing that Austria would be absorbed into Nazi Germany. Vienna was where most of Austria's Jews lived, and it was where the techniques of genocide were tested and refined. The persecution of Jews began almost immediately: Viennese Jews were harassed and hounded, and their homes and businesses plundered. Some were forced to scrub pro-independence slogans off the streets. In August 1938 the Nazis published a law ordering Jews to register with the police and have the middle names Israel or Sara added to their identity cards. In November 1938 the persecution culminated in the Kristallnacht, a nationwide pogrom against Jews carried out by the Schutzstaffel and the Sturmabteilung, with the support of the Hitler Youth and German civilians. All synagogues and prayer houses in the city were destroyed, except for the Stadttempel, due to its proximity to residential buildings. In March 1939 the authorities began to forcibly centralize Vienna's Jews in Judenhauser (Jewish houses). Vienna lost its status as a capital to Berlin, as Austria had ceased to exist. The few resistors in the city were arrested. In October 1939 the Nazis began deporting Jews from Vienna. Once the Japanese attacked Pearl Harbor in December 1941, the escape route to America closed.

Adolf Eichmann held office in the expropriated Palais Rothschild and organised the expropriation and persecution of Jews. Of the almost 200,000 Jews in Vienna, around 120,000 were driven to emigrate, and approximately 65,000 were killed. After the war, Vienna's Jewish population was only about 5,000.

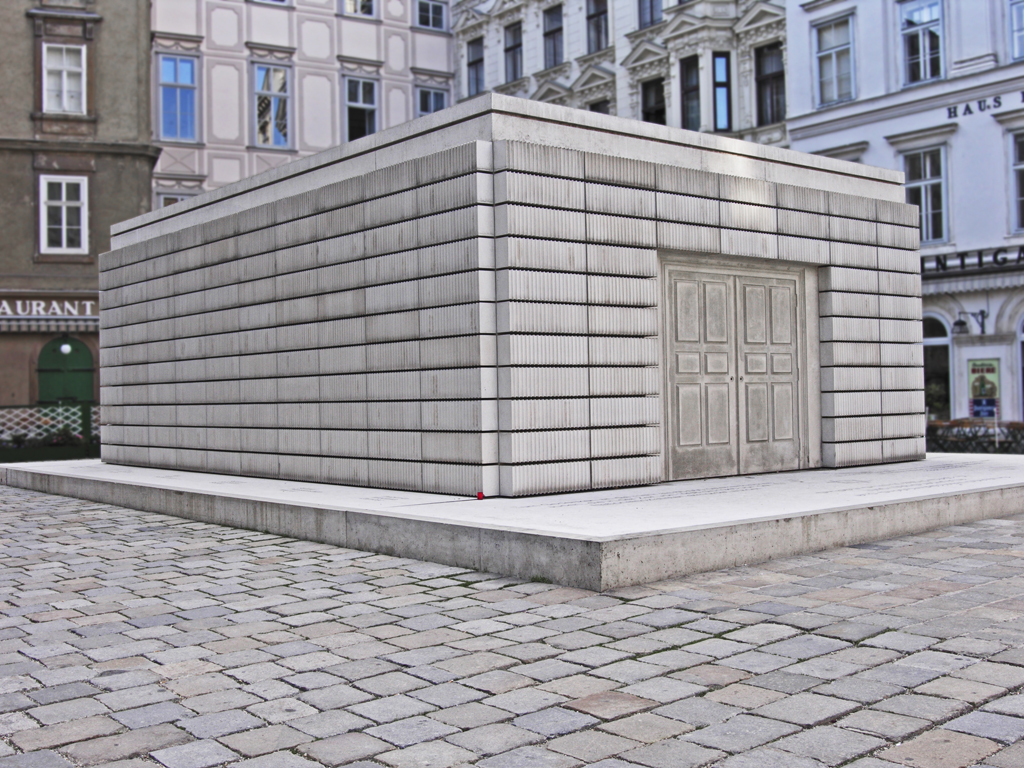
The Judenplatz Holocaust Memorial

In 1942, the city suffered its first air raid, carried out by the Soviet air force. Only after the Allies had taken Italy did the next raids commence. From 17 March 1944, a total of 51 air raids were carried out in Vienna. Targets of the bombings were primarily the city's oil refineries. However, around a third of the city centre was destroyed, and culturally important buildings such as the State Opera and the Burgtheater were burned, and the Albertina was heavily damaged. These air raids lasted until March 1945, just before the Soviet troops started the Vienna Offensive.

The Red Army, which had previously marched through Hungary, first entered Vienna on 6 April. Initially, they attacked the eastern and southern suburbs before advancing to the western suburbs. By the 8th, they had surrounded the city centre. The following day, the Soviets started with the infiltration of the city centre. Fighting continued for a few more days until the Soviet Navy’s Danube Flotilla naval force arrived with reinforcements. The remaining defending soldiers surrendered that same day.

=== Four-power Vienna ===
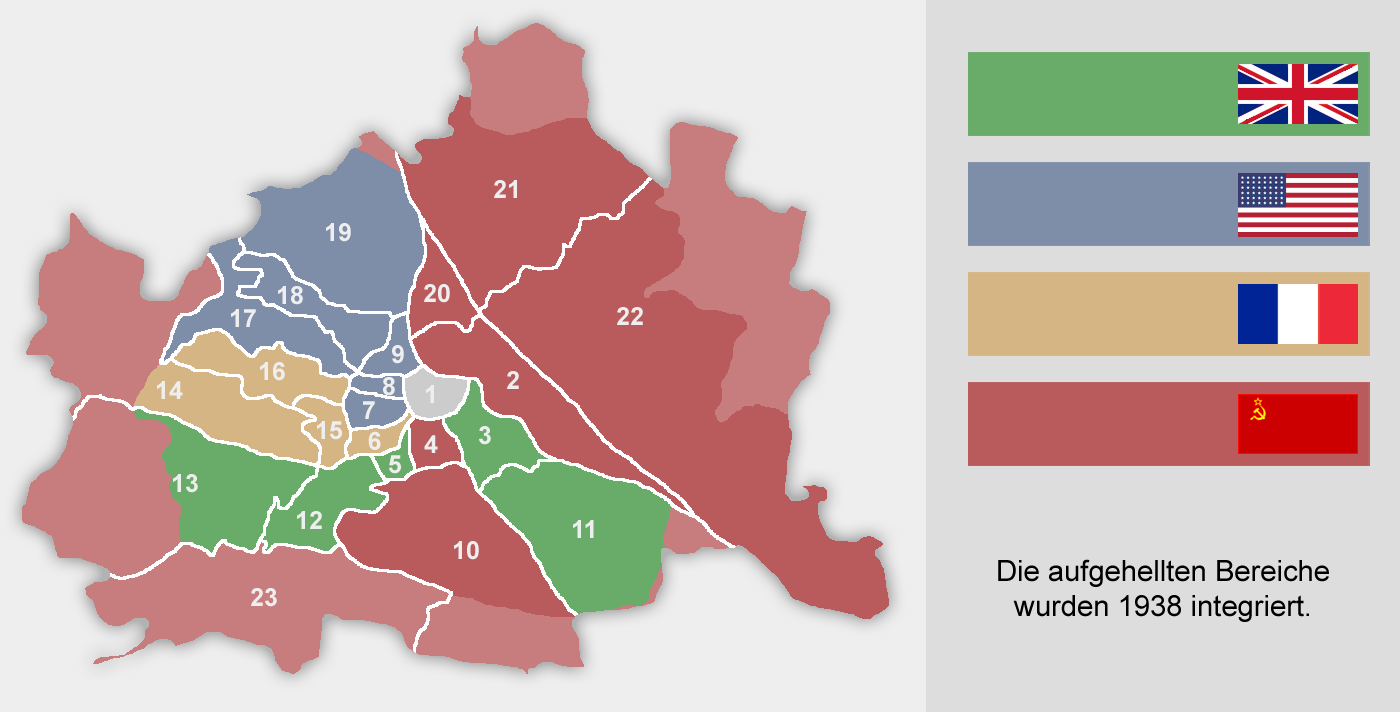
Allied-occupied zones between 1945 and 1955 following World War II

After the war, Vienna was part of Soviet-occupied Eastern Austria until September 1945. That month, Vienna was divided into sectors by the four powers: the US, the UK, France, and the Soviet Union and supervised by an Allied Commission. The four-power occupation of Vienna differed in one key respect from that of Berlin: the central area of the city, known as the first district, constituted an international zone in which the four powers alternated control every month. The city was policed by the four powers on a day-to-day basis using the "four soldiers in a jeep" method, with one soldier from each nation seated together. The four powers all had separate headquarters: the Soviets in Palais Epstein next to the Parliament, the French in Hotel Kummer on Mariahilferstraße, the Americans in the National Bank, and the British in Schönnbrunn Palace. The division of the city was not comparable to that of Berlin. Although the borders between the sectors were marked, travel between them was freely possible.

During the ten years of the four-power occupation, Vienna was a hotbed for international espionage between the Western and Eastern Blocs, which deeply distrusted each other. The city experienced an economic upturn due to the Marshall Plan. The atmosphere of the four-power Vienna serves as the backdrop for Graham Greene's screenplay for the film The Third Man (1949). The film's theme music was composed and performed by Viennese musician Anton Karas using a zither. Later, he adapted the screenplay into a novel and published it.

=== Austrian State Treaty and subsequent sovereignty ===
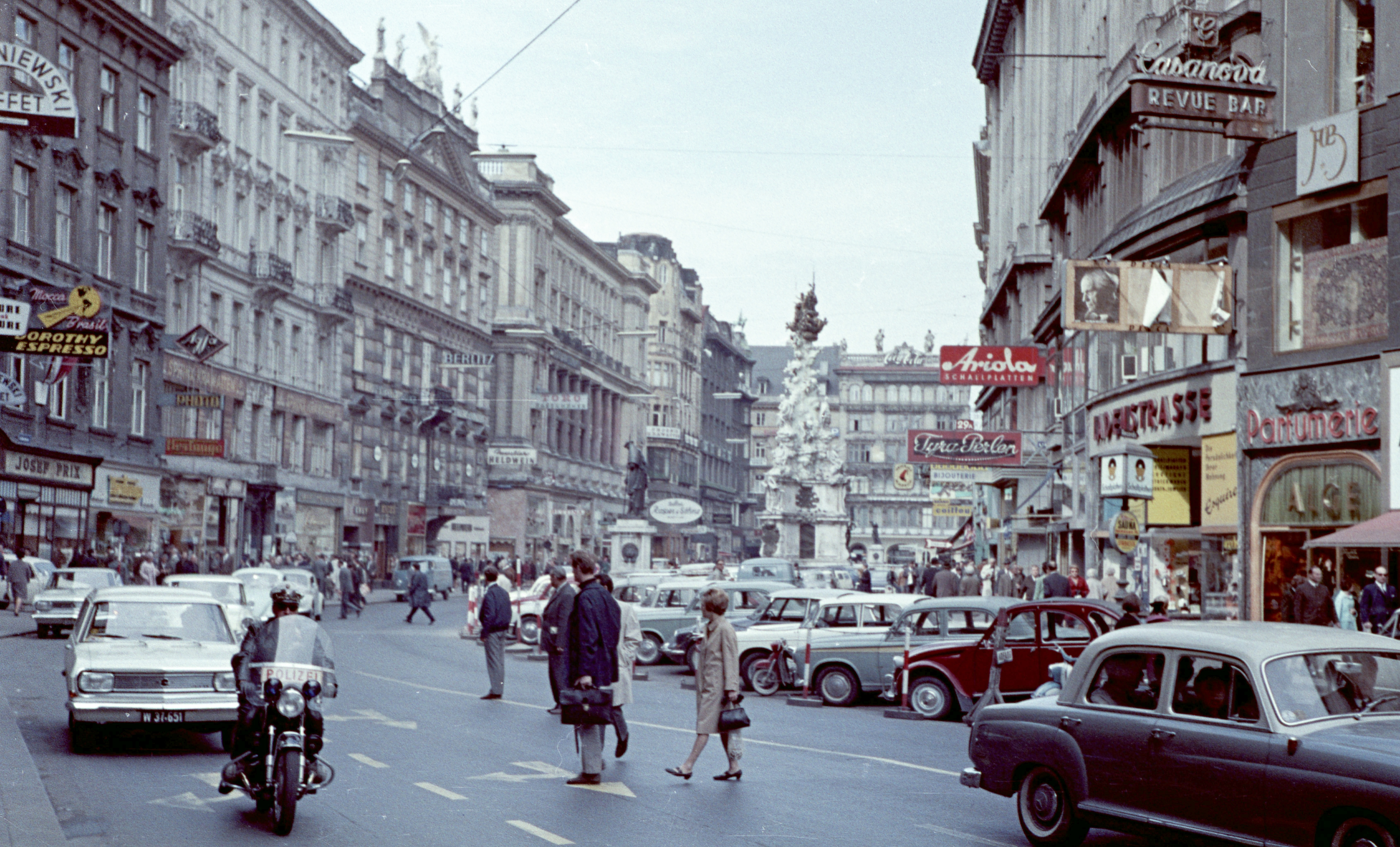
The Graben in 1966—it has since been pedestrianised

The four-power control of Vienna lasted until the Austrian State Treaty was signed in May 1955 and came into force on 27 July 1955. By October, all soldiers had left the country. That year, after years of reconstruction and restoration, the State Opera and the Burgtheater—both on the Ringstraße—reopened to the public.

In the Autumn of 1956, Vienna accepted many Hungarian refugees fleeing Hungary after an attempted revolution. The city experienced another wave of refugees after the Prague Spring in Czechoslovakia in 1968, as well as after the collapse of Yugoslavia in 1991.

In 1972, the construction of the Donauinsel and the excavation of the New Danube began. In the same decade, Austrian Chancellor Bruno Kreisky inaugurated the Vienna International Centre, a new area of the city created to host international institutions. Vienna has regained much of its former international stature by hosting international organisations, such as the United Nations.

== Demographics ==
Historical population
Year	Pop.	±%
1637	60,000	—
1683	90,000	+50.0%
1710	113,800	+26.4%
1754	175,460	+54.2%
1783	247,753	+41.2%
1793	271,800	+9.7%
1830	401,200	+47.6%
1840	469,400	+17.0%
1850	551,300	+17.4%
1857	683,000	+23.9%
1869	900,998	+31.9%
1880	1,162,591	+29.0%
1890	1,430,213	+23.0%
1900	1,769,137	+23.7%
1910	2,083,630	+17.8%
1923	1,918,720	−7.9%
1934	1,935,881	+0.9%
1939	1,770,938	−8.5%
1951	1,616,125	−8.7%
1961	1,627,566	+0.7%
1971	1,619,885	−0.5%
1981	1,531,346	−5.5%
1991	1,539,848	+0.6%
2001	1,550,123	+0.7%
2011	1,714,227	+10.6%
2021	1,926,960	+12.4%
2025	2,028,399	+5.3%
Source for 1869-2021:

Significant foreign resident groups
Country of birth	Population as of 1 January 2025
Serbia	87,746
Turkey	67,258
Germany	64,673
Syria	55,666
Poland	48,015
Bosnia and Herzegovina	46,519
Romania	39,926
Ukraine	39,629
Hungary	25,524
Russia	23,796
Afghanistan	23,478
Bulgaria	20,474

Because of the industrialization and migration from other parts of the Empire, the population of Vienna increased sharply during its time as the capital of Austria-Hungary (1867–1918). In 1910, Vienna had more than two million inhabitants and was the third largest city in Europe after London and Paris. Around the start of the 20th century, Vienna was the city with the second-largest Czech population in the world (after Prague). After World War I, many Czechs and Hungarians returned to their ancestral countries, resulting in a decline in the Viennese population. After World War II, the Soviets used force to repatriate key workers of Czech, Slovak, and Hungarian origins to return to their ethnic homelands to further the Soviet bloc economy. The population of Vienna generally stagnated or declined through the remainder of the 20th century, not demonstrating significant growth again until the census of 2000. In 2020, Vienna's population remained significantly below its reported peak in 1916.

Under the Nazi regime, 65,000 Jews were deported and murdered in concentration camps by Nazi forces; approximately 130,000 fled.

By 2001, 16% of people living in Austria had nationalities other than Austrian, nearly half of whom were from former Yugoslavia; the next most numerous nationalities in Vienna were Turks (39,000; 2.5%), Poles (13,600; 0.9%) and Germans (12,700; 0.8%).

As of 2012, an official report from Statistics Austria showed that more than 660,000 (38.8%) of the Viennese population have full or partial migrant background, mostly from Ex-Yugoslavia, Turkey, Germany, Poland, Romania and Hungary.

From 2005 to 2015, the city's population grew by 10.1%. According to UN-Habitat, Vienna could be the fastest growing city out of 17 European metropolitan areas until 2025 with an increase of 4.65% of its population, compared to 2010.

Population by migration background (2023)
Background	Nos.
Native born	970,900
1st generation migration background	739,500
2nd generation migration background	242,900
Total	1,953,300

=== Religion ===
Religion in Vienna (2021)
1. Unaffiliated (34.0%)
2. Catholic Church (32.0%)
3. Eastern Orthodoxy (11.0%)
4. Islam (15.0%)
5. Other (8.00%)

According to the 2021 census, 49.0% of Viennese were Christian. Among them, 31.8% were Catholic, 11.2% were Eastern Orthodox, and 3.7% were Protestant, mostly Lutheran, 34.1% had no religious affiliation, 14.8% were Muslim, and 2% were of other religions, including Jewish. One source estimates that Vienna's Jewish community is of 8,000 members meanwhile another suggests 15,000.

Based on information provided to city officials by various religious organizations about their membership, Vienna's Statistical Yearbook 2019 reports in 2018 an estimated 610,269 Roman Catholics, or 32.3% of the population, and 200,000 (10.4%) Muslims, 70,298 (3.7%) Orthodox, 57,502 (3.0%) other Christians, and 9,504 (0.5%) other religions. A study conducted by the Vienna Institute of Demography estimated the 2018 proportions to be 34% Catholic, 30% unaffiliated, 15% Muslim, 10% Orthodox, 4% Protestant, and 6% other religions.

As of spring 2014, Muslims made up 30% of schoolchildren in Vienna, and by 2017 Muslim children in Vienna primary schools were more numerous than Catholic children

Vienna is the seat of the Metropolitan Roman Catholic Archdiocese of Vienna, in which is also vested the exempt Ordinariate for Byzantine-Rite Catholics in Austria; its Archbishop is Cardinal Christoph Schönborn. Many Catholic Churches in central Vienna feature performances of religious or other music, including masses sung to classical music and organ. Some of Vienna's most significant historical buildings are Catholic churches, including the St. Stephen's Cathedral (Stephansdom), Karlskirche, Peterskirche and the Votivkirche. On the banks of the Danube is a Buddhist Peace Pagoda, built in 1983 by the monks and nuns of Nipponzan Myohoji.

== Geography ==
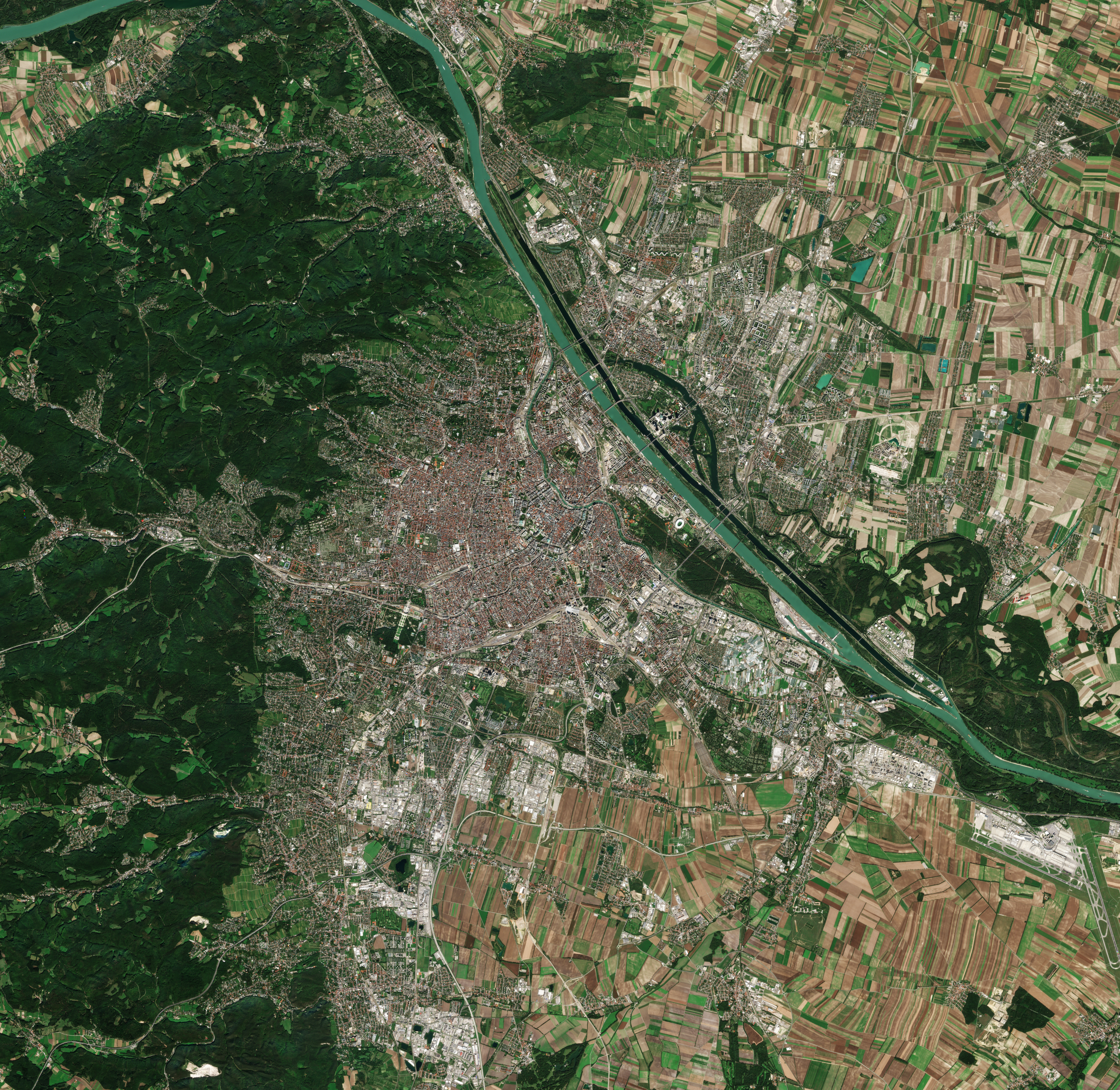
A 2018 satellite photo by Sentinel-2

Vienna is located in northeastern Austria, at the easternmost extension of the Alps in the Vienna Basin. The earliest settlement, at the location of today's inner city, was south of the meandering Danube, while the city now spans both sides of the river. Elevation ranges from 151 to 542 m (495 to 1,778 ft). The city has a total area of 414.78 square kilometres (160.1 sq mi), making it the largest city in Austria by area.

=== Climate ===
Vienna's urban core has a humid subtropical (Köppen: Cfa) climate. However, elevated north/western edges of Vienna still have an oceanic climate (Köppen: Cfb).

The city has warm to hot showery summers, with average high temperatures ranging between 27 and 32 °C (81 and 90 °F) and a record maximum of 41 °C (106 °F), measured on 3 August 2026. Winters are relatively dry and fairly cold with daily mean temperatures around or somewhat above the freezing point. Spring is variable and autumn is cool, with a chance of frost in and after November up to and sometimes including April. Snowfall has become much rarer over the last few decades due to anthropogenic global warming, especially in the urban core with the urban heat island effect.

Precipitation is generally moderate throughout the year, averaging around 600 mm (23.6 in) annually, with considerable local variations, the Vienna Woods region in the west being the wettest part (700 to 800 mm (28 to 31 in) annually) and the flat plains in the east being the driest part (500 to 550 mm (20 to 22 in) annually). Snow in winter is not common anymore and not so frequent compared to the mostly alpine Western and Southern regions of Austria.

Climate data for Vienna (Innere Stadt), 1991–2020 normals, extremes 1775–present
Month	Jan	Feb	Mar	Apr	May	Jun	Jul	Aug	Sep	Oct	Nov	Dec	Year
Record high °C (°F)	19.5 (67.1)	20.6 (69.1)	25.5 (77.9)	31.2 (88.2)	34.1 (93.4)	40.0 (104.0)	39.5 (103.1)	41.0 (105.8)	34.5 (94.1)	28.5 (83.3)	21.7 (71.1)	18.6 (65.5)	40.0 (104.0)
Mean maximum °C (°F)	12.8 (55.0)	15.3 (59.5)	20.4 (68.7)	25.1 (77.2)	29.3 (84.7)	33.1 (91.6)	35.2 (95.4)	35.1 (95.2)	29.5 (85.1)	23.4 (74.1)	16.9 (62.4)	12.4 (54.3)	35.9 (96.6)
Mean daily maximum °C (°F)	4.2 (39.6)	7.0 (44.6)	11.0 (51.8)	17.4 (63.3)	21.1 (70.0)	25.7 (78.3)	26.9 (80.4)	26.6 (79.9)	21.6 (70.9)	15.0 (59.0)	9.5 (49.1)	4.7 (40.5)	15.9 (60.6)
Daily mean °C (°F)	2.1 (35.8)	3.8 (38.8)	7.7 (45.9)	13.0 (55.4)	17.3 (63.1)	21.0 (69.8)	23.0 (73.4)	22.8 (73.0)	17.7 (63.9)	12.3 (54.1)	7.2 (45.0)	2.8 (37.0)	12.6 (54.7)
Mean daily minimum °C (°F)	−0.1 (31.8)	1.1 (34.0)	4.0 (39.2)	8.6 (47.5)	12.3 (54.1)	16.4 (61.5)	17.7 (63.9)	17.5 (63.5)	13.8 (56.8)	8.9 (48.0)	5.0 (41.0)	0.7 (33.3)	8.8 (47.8)
Mean minimum °C (°F)	−7.6 (18.3)	−5.6 (21.9)	−1.8 (28.8)	2.9 (37.2)	7.6 (45.7)	11.8 (53.2)	13.9 (57.0)	13.8 (56.8)	9.4 (48.9)	4.2 (39.6)	−0.8 (30.6)	−5.4 (22.3)	−9.6 (14.7)
Record low °C (°F)	−23.8 (−10.8)	−26.0 (−14.8)	−16.3 (2.7)	−8.1 (17.4)	−1.8 (28.8)	3.2 (37.8)	6.9 (44.4)	6.5 (43.7)	−0.6 (30.9)	−9.1 (15.6)	−14.3 (6.3)	−20.7 (−5.3)	−26.0 (−14.8)
Average precipitation mm (inches)	37.6 (1.48)	33.5 (1.32)	46.3 (1.82)	39.6 (1.56)	78.3 (3.08)	82.0 (3.23)	80.3 (3.16)	73.8 (2.91)	67.3 (2.65)	47.7 (1.88)	42.9 (1.69)	39.9 (1.57)	669.2 (26.35)
Average precipitation days (≥ 1.0 mm)	7.5	6.3	7.7	6.4	9.3	9.0	8.9	8.0	7.2	7.0	6.9	7.7	91.9
Average relative humidity (%) (at 14:00)	75.0	67.6	62.1	53.9	54.3	56.9	54.4	54.4	61.0	64.9	74.9	78.4	63.2
Mean monthly sunshine hours	70.4	103.7	154.9	216.6	248.5	259.1	273.3	266.3	194.0	133.3	70.7	57.1	2,047.9
Percentage possible sunshine	26.7	37.1	42.8	53.8	53.9	55.2	57.9	61.7	52.6	40.9	26.4	23.0	44.3
Source: Central Institute for Meteorology and Geodynamics all-time extreme temperatureGeoSphere Austria

Climate data for Vienna (Hohe Warte), 1991–2020 normals, extremes 1775–present
Month	Jan	Feb	Mar	Apr	May	Jun	Jul	Aug	Sep	Oct	Nov	Dec	Year
Record high °C (°F)	18.7 (65.7)	20.6 (69.1)	25.5 (77.9)	29.5 (85.1)	34.0 (93.2)	39.7 (103.5)	39.5 (103.1)	38.4 (101.1)	34.0 (93.2)	27.8 (82.0)	21.7 (71.1)	18.6 (65.5)	39.7 (103.5)
Mean daily maximum °C (°F)	3.5 (38.3)	6.5 (43.7)	10.7 (51.3)	17.2 (63.0)	20.7 (69.3)	25.1 (77.2)	26.4 (79.5)	26.1 (79.0)	21.1 (70.0)	14.3 (57.7)	8.8 (47.8)	4.0 (39.2)	15.4 (59.7)
Daily mean °C (°F)	1.1 (34.0)	2.8 (37.0)	6.9 (44.4)	11.9 (53.4)	16.3 (61.3)	20.0 (68.0)	21.9 (71.4)	21.6 (70.9)	16.6 (61.9)	11.2 (52.2)	6.2 (43.2)	1.8 (35.2)	11.5 (52.7)
Mean daily minimum °C (°F)	−1.3 (29.7)	−0.5 (31.1)	2.6 (36.7)	6.7 (44.1)	10.7 (51.3)	14.7 (58.5)	15.9 (60.6)	15.6 (60.1)	12.0 (53.6)	7.3 (45.1)	3.7 (38.7)	−0.4 (31.3)	7.2 (45.0)
Record low °C (°F)	−23.8 (−10.8)	−26.0 (−14.8)	−16.3 (2.7)	−8.1 (17.4)	−1.8 (28.8)	3.2 (37.8)	6.9 (44.4)	6.5 (43.7)	−0.6 (30.9)	−9.1 (15.6)	−14.3 (6.3)	−20.7 (−5.3)	−26.0 (−14.8)
Average precipitation mm (inches)	42.1 (1.66)	38.1 (1.50)	51.6 (2.03)	41.8 (1.65)	78.9 (3.11)	70.0 (2.76)	77.7 (3.06)	69.1 (2.72)	64.1 (2.52)	46.9 (1.85)	46.0 (1.81)	46.8 (1.84)	673.1 (26.50)
Average snowfall cm (inches)	15.9 (6.3)	13.6 (5.4)	5.2 (2.0)	1.1 (0.4)	0.0 (0.0)	0.0 (0.0)	0.0 (0.0)	0.0 (0.0)	0.0 (0.0)	0.4 (0.2)	3.2 (1.3)	10.8 (4.3)	50.2 (19.9)
Average precipitation days (≥ 1.0 mm)	8.7	7.1	8.7	6.5	9.4	8.4	8.9	7.9	7.4	7.2	7.6	8.6	96.4
Average snowy days (≥ 1.0 cm)	11.4	8.8	3.4	0.3	0.0	0.0	0.0	0.0	0.0	0.1	1.6	6.2	31.8
Average relative humidity (%) (at 14:00)	73.4	64.9	57.7	51.6	54.6	54.4	53.3	52.8	58.4	66.2	74.3	76.6	61.5
Mean monthly sunshine hours	70.2	104.9	155.1	216.5	248.3	260.5	273.6	266.3	191.7	129.9	67.7	57.1	2,041.8
Percentage possible sunshine	26.4	37.5	43.0	54.1	54.4	56.3	58.6	62.1	52.2	40.0	25.1	22.6	44.4
Source 1: Central Institute for Meteorology and Geodynamics
Source 2: Meteo Climat (record highs and lows) wien.orf.at

Climate data for Vienna (Hohe Warte), 1961–1990 normals and extremes (Note: Afternoon humidity measured at 14:00 local time)
Month	Jan	Feb	Mar	Apr	May	Jun	Jul	Aug	Sep	Oct	Nov	Dec	Year
Mean maximum °C (°F)	10.2 (50.4)	11.9 (53.4)	19.6 (67.3)	23.5 (74.3)	26.6 (79.9)	30.1 (86.2)	31.8 (89.2)	31.5 (88.7)	27.6 (81.7)	21.6 (70.9)	16.0 (60.8)	11.3 (52.3)	31.8 (89.2)
Mean daily maximum °C (°F)	2.9 (37.2)	5.1 (41.2)	10.3 (50.5)	15.2 (59.4)	20.5 (68.9)	23.4 (74.1)	25.6 (78.1)	25.4 (77.7)	20.3 (68.5)	14.2 (57.6)	7.5 (45.5)	4.0 (39.2)	14.5 (58.2)
Daily mean °C (°F)	−0.6 (30.9)	1.6 (34.9)	5.8 (42.4)	10.5 (50.9)	15.1 (59.2)	18.2 (64.8)	20.1 (68.2)	19.7 (67.5)	16.0 (60.8)	10.6 (51.1)	5.1 (41.2)	1.2 (34.2)	10.3 (50.5)
Mean daily minimum °C (°F)	−2.0 (28.4)	−0.9 (30.4)	2.4 (36.3)	5.8 (42.4)	10.5 (50.9)	13.5 (56.3)	15.4 (59.7)	15.3 (59.5)	11.7 (53.1)	7.0 (44.6)	2.4 (36.3)	−0.5 (31.1)	6.7 (44.1)
Mean minimum °C (°F)	−10.2 (13.6)	−8.3 (17.1)	−4.8 (23.4)	0.0 (32.0)	4.2 (39.6)	8.0 (46.4)	10.3 (50.5)	9.6 (49.3)	5.9 (42.6)	0.3 (32.5)	−3.8 (25.2)	−9.1 (15.6)	−10.2 (13.6)
Average precipitation mm (inches)	38.0 (1.50)	42.0 (1.65)	41.0 (1.61)	51.0 (2.01)	61.0 (2.40)	74.0 (2.91)	63.0 (2.48)	58.0 (2.28)	45.0 (1.77)	41.0 (1.61)	50.0 (1.97)	43.0 (1.69)	607 (23.88)
Average precipitation days (≥ 1.0 mm)	8	8	8	8	9	9	9	8	6	6	8	8	95
Average relative humidity (%)	79	76	69	64	66	66	64	68	74	78	80	80	72
Average afternoon relative humidity (%)	73	68	57	51	53	55	52	53	58	64	72	75	61
Average dew point °C (°F)	−3.5 (25.7)	−2.3 (27.9)	−0.2 (31.6)	3.1 (37.6)	8.2 (46.8)	11.4 (52.5)	12.6 (54.7)	12.7 (54.9)	10.4 (50.7)	6.3 (43.3)	1.5 (34.7)	−1.8 (28.8)	4.9 (40.8)
Mean monthly sunshine hours	56	78	126	170	221	223	246	228	171	137	63	52	1,771
Source 1: Deutscher Wetterdienst
Source 2: NOAA(mean monthly max/min-Sun-Dew Point)

== Districts and enlargement ==
Map of the districts of Vienna with numbers

=== Districts ===
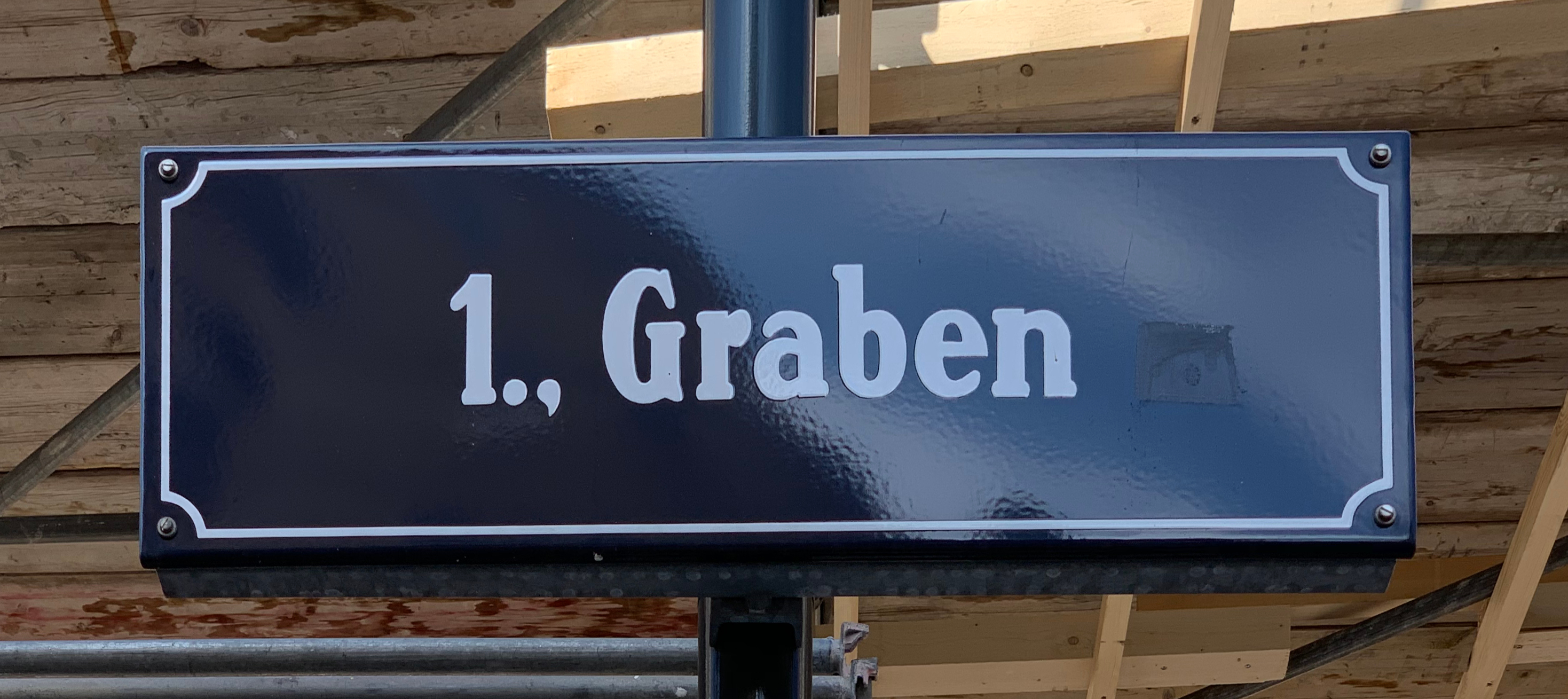
A street sign in the 1st district

Vienna is divided into 23 districts. The district numbers are displayed on every street sign before the street name (e.g., 16, Thaliastraße). They also serve as the second and third digits of the postcode (1010 for the 1st district to 1230 for the 23rd district). Each district has a coat of arms, which include the symbols of the various district parts.

No.	District	Coat of arms	Area (km^{2})	Population (2023)	Density per km^{2}	Map
1	Innere Stadt	Innere Stadt	2.869	16,538	5,764	
2	Leopoldstadt	Leopoldstadt	19.242	110,100	5,707	
3	Landstraße	Landstraße	7.403	98,398	13,292	
4	Wieden	Wieden	1.776	33,155	18,668	
5	Margareten	Margareten	2.012	54,400	27,038	
6	Mariahilf	Mariahilf	1.455	31,386	21,571	
7	Neubau	Neubau	1.608	31,513	19,598	
8	Josefstadt	Josefstadt	1.090	24,499	22,476	
9	Alsergrund	Alsergrund	2.976	41,631	13,989	
10	Favoriten	Favoriten	31.823	220,324	6,923	
11	Simmering	Simmering	23.256	110,559	4,754	
12	Meidling	Meidling	8.103	101,714	12,556	
13	Hietzing	Hietzing	37.713	55,505	1,472	
14	Penzing	Penzing	33.760	98,161	2,908	
15	Rudolfsheim-Fünfhaus	Rudolfsheim-Fünfhaus	3.918	76,381	19,495	
16	Ottakring	Ottakring	8.673	102,770	11,849	
17	Hernals	Hernals	11.396	56,671	4,973	
18	Währing	Währing	6.347	51,395	8,098	
19	Döbling	Döbling	24.944	75,400	3,023	
20	Brigittenau	Brigittenau	5.710	85,930	15,049	
21	Floridsdorf	Floridsdorf	44.443	186,233	4,190	
22	Donaustadt	Donaustadt	102.299	220,794	2,158	
23	Liesing	Liesing	32.061	121,303	3,784	

== Politics ==
=== Political history ===
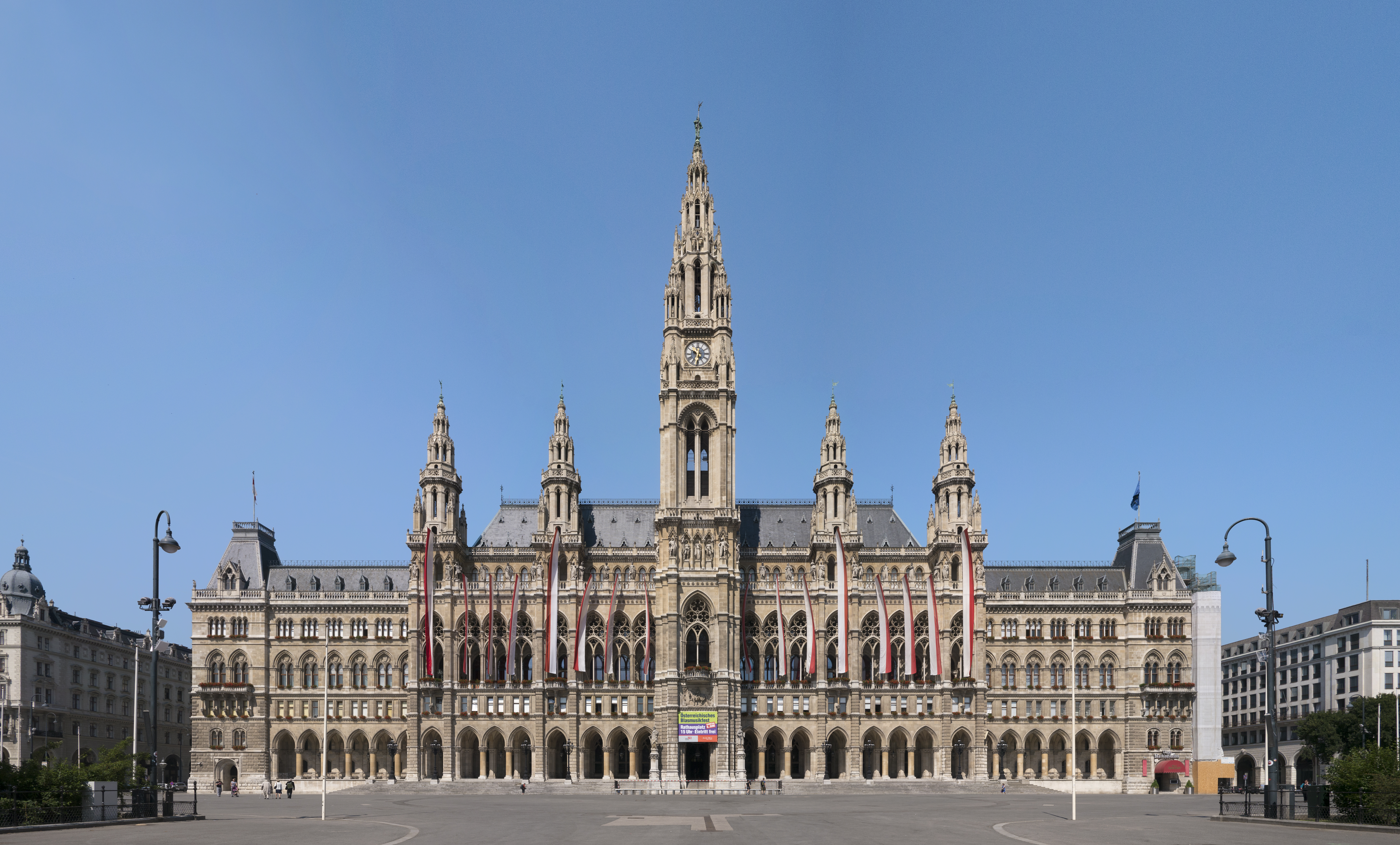
The Rathaus (City Hall), the seat of the local government

After Vienna was liberated by Soviet forces in 1945, a provisional city government was formed under Socialist Theodor Körner. The first democratic municipal elections were held in November 1945. The Socialist Party (SPÖ) won an absolute majority with 57.1% of the vote. The SPÖ has been the biggest party in the Viennese Parliament ever since, only losing their absolute majority in 1996. They subsequently formed government coalitions with the People's Party (ÖVP) from 1996 to 2001, with the Greens from 2010 to 2020, and with the NEOS from 2020 onwards.

As Vienna is both a state (Bundesland) and a municipality (Gemeinde), its political institutions are combined. The city council (Gemeinderat) simultaneously serves as the state parliament (Landtag), while the city government (Stadtsenat) functions as the state government. The mayor (Bürgermeister) therefore also holds the office of the state governor (Landeshauptman).

Vienna's post-war mayors have been: Karl Renner, Franz Jonas, Bruno Marek, Felix Slavik, Leopold Gratz, Helmut Zilk, Michael Häupl, and Michael Ludwig (all SPÖ).

=== Government ===
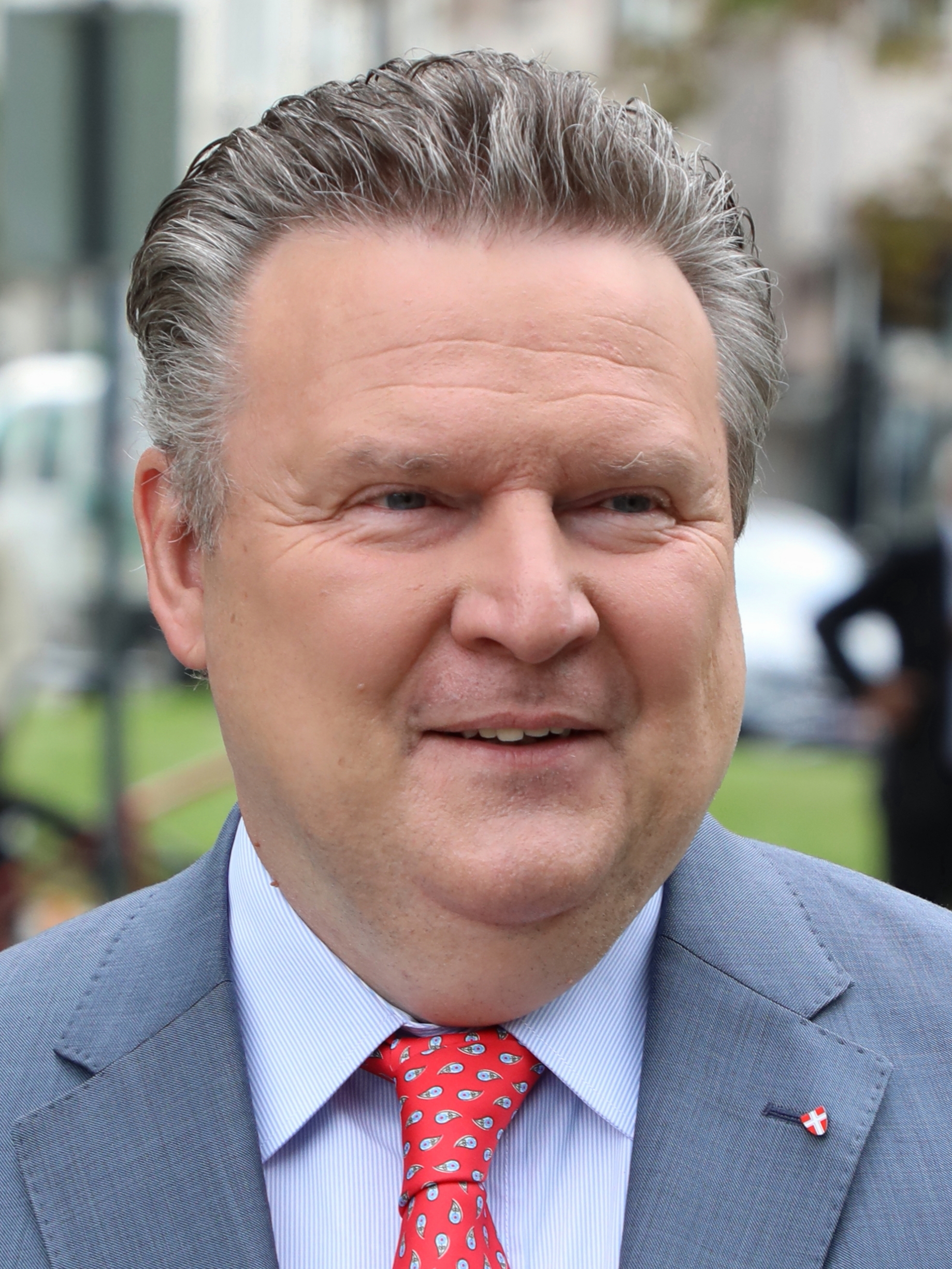
Michael Ludwig (SPÖ), mayor of Vienna since 2018

In the 1996 City Council election, the SPÖ lost its overall majority in the 100-seat chamber, winning 43 seats and 39.15% of the vote. In the same election, the Freedom Party of Austria (FPÖ) won 29 seats, an increase from 21 in 1991, and surpassed the ÖVP, which finished in third place for the second consecutive election. From 1996 to 2001, the SPÖ governed Vienna in a coalition with the ÖVP.

In 2001, the SPÖ regained its overall majority with 52 seats and 46.91% of the vote. In 2005, this majority increased further to 55 seats (49.09%). However, in the 2010 elections, the SPÖ lost its overall majority again and subsequently formed a coalition with the Green Party – the first SPÖ/Green coalition in Austria. This coalition remained in place following the 2015 election. After the 2020 election, the SPÖ formed a coalition with NEOS – The New Austria and Liberal Forum. This coalition continued after the 2025 election.

==== Current government ====
The latest elections were held on 27 April 2025.

Seats
Total 100 seats
- SPÖ: 43
- NEOS: 10
- FPÖ: 22
- Greens: 15
- ÖVP: 10

Party	Votes	%	+/-	Seats	+/-
Social Democratic Party (SPÖ)	268,514	39.38	-2.24	43	-3
Freedom Party (FPÖ)	138,761	20.35	+13.24	22	+14
The Greens (GRÜNE)	98,995	14.52	-0.28	15	-1
NEOS	68,152	10.00	+2.53	10	+2
Austrian People's Party (ÖVP)	65,820	9.65	-10.78	10	-12
Communist Party (KPÖ)	27,657	4.06	+2.00	0	–
Other	13,909	2.04	+4.46	–	–
Total	696,345	100	–	100	–

== Culture ==
=== Classical music, theatre, and opera ===
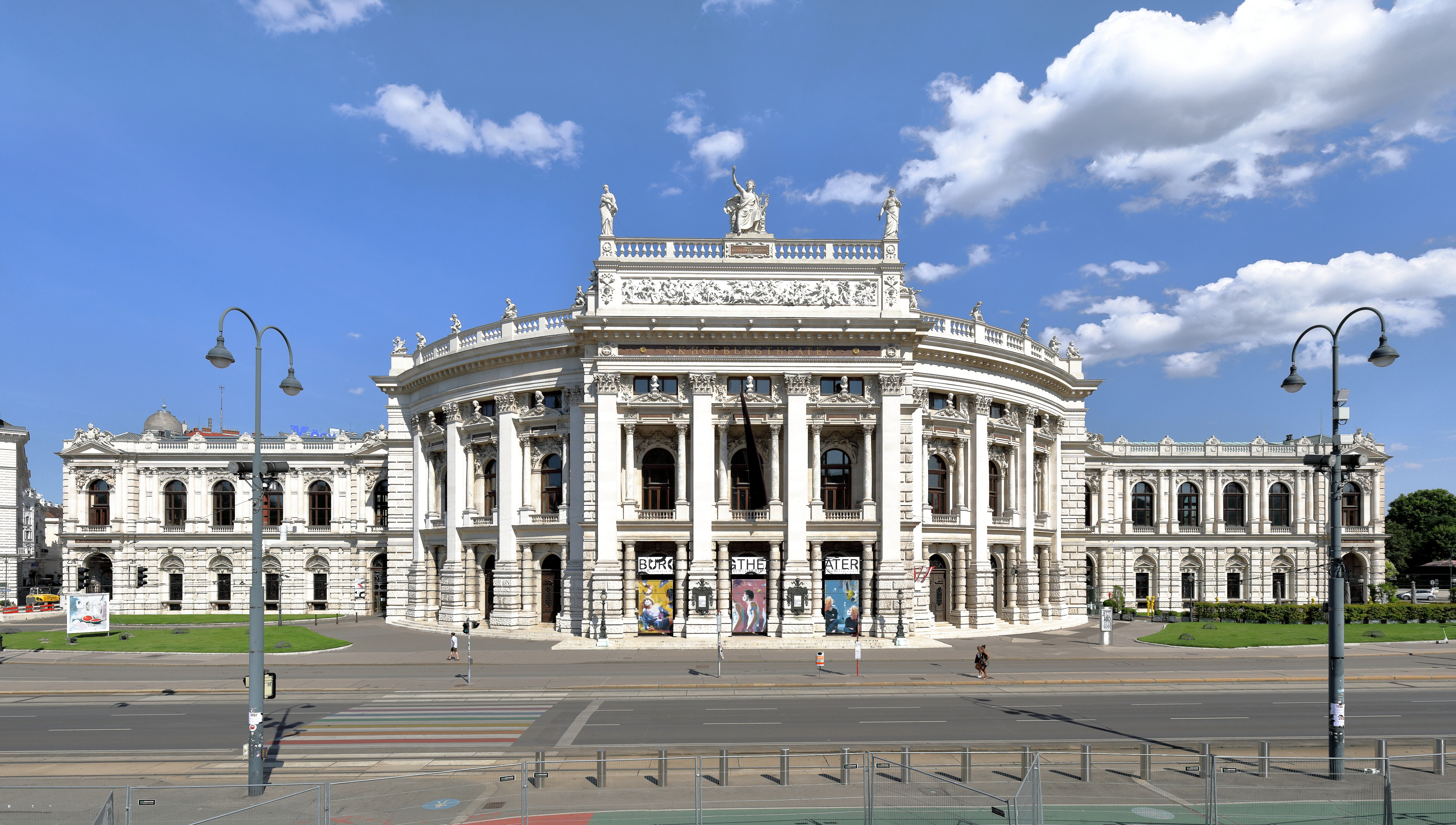
The Burgtheater on the Ring

Vienna has a long-standing tradition of art and culture, encompassing theatre, opera, classical music, and fine arts. The Burgtheater is considered one of the premier theatres in the German-speaking world alongside its branch, the Akademietheater. The Volkstheater and the Theater in der Josefstadt also enjoy good reputations. There is also a multitude of smaller theatres, in many cases devoted to less mainstream forms of the performing arts, such as modern or experimental plays, as well as cabaret.

The city is also home to several opera houses, including the Theater an der Wien, the Staatsoper, and the Volksoper, the latter being devoted to the typical Viennese operetta.

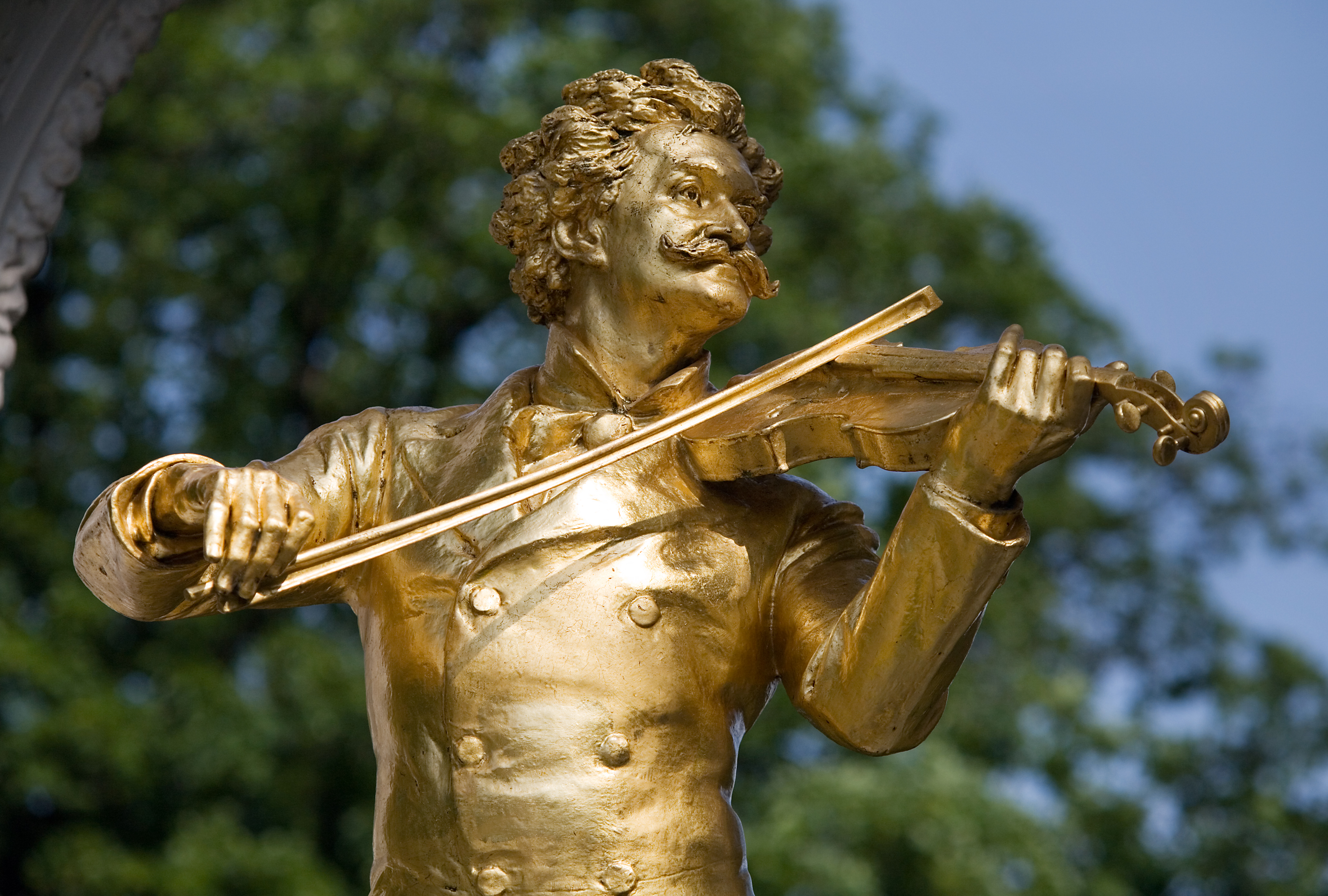
A monument of Johann Strauss II in the Stadtpark

Vienna has long been a hub for classical music, nurturing both native composers and musicians who moved there to work. Notable composers born in Vienna include Franz Schubert, Arnold Schoenberg, Alban Berg, Anton Webern, Joseph Lanner, Johann Strauss I, and Johann Strauss II. Violinist Fritz Kreisler and electronic music pioneer Louie Austen also hail from the city.

Many influential composers relocated to Vienna, including Joseph Haydn, Wolfgang Amadeus Mozart, Ludwig van Beethoven, Johannes Brahms, Franz Liszt, Gustav Mahler, Anton Bruckner, and Antonio Salieri. The city also hosted premieres of operas such as Fidelio, Die Fledermaus, The Gypsy Baron, The Magic Flute, and The Marriage of Figaro.

Vienna continues to be a centre for classical performances, with venues like the Wiener Musikverein, home of the Vienna Philharmonic Orchestra, famous for its annual New Year's Concert, and the Wiener Konzerthaus, headquarters of the Vienna Symphony Orchestra. Many concerts cater to tourists, featuring music by Mozart and the Strauss family.

Up until 2005, the Theater an der Wien hosted premieres of musicals, but since 2006 (a year dedicated to the 250th anniversary of Mozart's birth), it has devoted itself to opera again, becoming a stagione opera house offering one new production each month. Since 2012, Theater an der Wien has taken over the Wiener Kammeroper, a historically small theatre in the first district of Vienna, seating 300 spectators, turning it into its second venue for smaller-sized productions and chamber operas created by the young ensemble of Theater an der Wien (JET). Before 2005, the most successful musical was Elisabeth, which was later translated into several languages and performed around the world. The Wiener Taschenoper is dedicated to stage music of the 20th and 21st centuries. The Haus der Musik museum ("House of Music") opened in 2000.

Founded in 1963 and located in Josefstadt, the Vienna's English Theatre (VET) is the oldest English-language theatre in continental Europe.

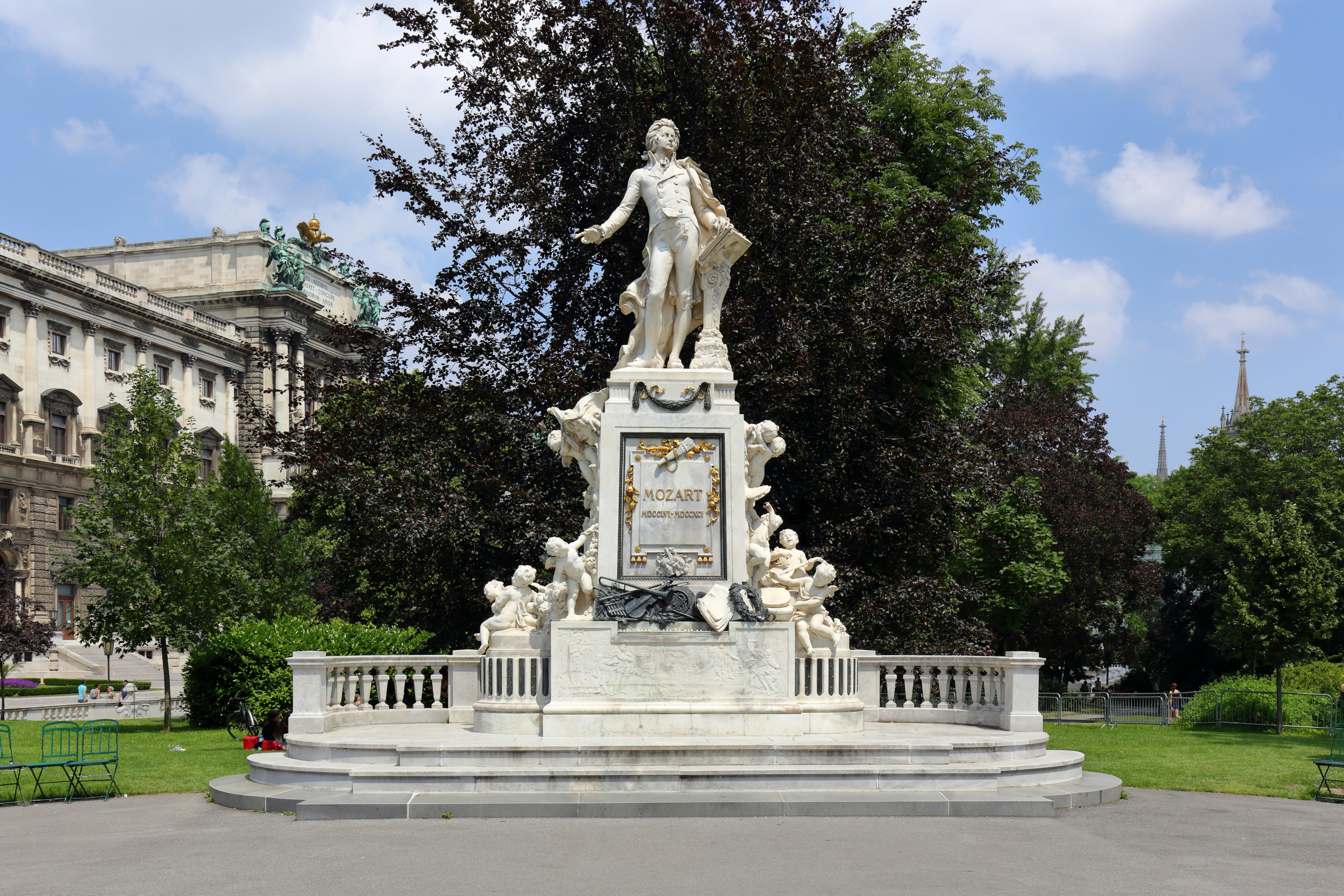
The Mozart Monument in the Burggarten

=== Popular music ===
Vienna has made significant contributions to pop music, with pioneers of Austropop such as Georg Danzer, Rainhard Fendrich, Wolfgang Ambros, and Peter Cornelius. Willi Resetarits lived in the city from the age of three. The internationally best-known Viennese artist was Falco, whose song "Rock Me Amadeus" is the only German-language song to reach number 1 on the American Billboard Hot 100, which it held for three weeks in 1986. His other hits, such as "Der Kommissar" and "Jeanny" also charted internationally. The founder of the American jazz fusion band Weather Report and Miles Davis collaborator, Joe Zawinul, was born in Vienna and studied music at the Conservatory of Vienna.

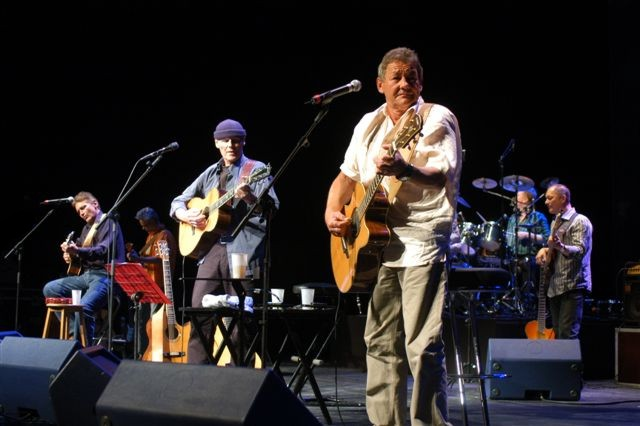
Rainhard Fendrich, Georg Danzer, and Wolfgang Ambros (L-R) performing in the Stadthalle in 2007

Current artists include Rapper RAF Camora, hip-hop-musician Yung Hurn and indie pop band Wanda.

Multiple popular songs have been written about Vienna, such as "Vienna" (1977) by Billy Joel, "Vienna" (1981) by Ultravox, and "Vienna Calling" by Falco.

The Wienerlied is a unique song genre from Vienna. They are sung in Viennese dialect and often centre around the city. There are approximately 60,000 – 70,000 Wienerlieder.

Every year, the Donauinsel stages the Donauinselfest, the largest open-air music festival in the world, with approximately 3 million attendees over three days. The festival is organised by the SPÖ Wien and is free to enter. The Vienna Jazz Festival has taken place almost every year since 1991 and has featured artists such as Nina Simone, Miles Davis, Dizzy Gillespie, and Ravi Shankar. Concert venues in the city include the Wiener Stadthalle, which hosted the Eurovision Song Contest in 2015 and 2026, as well as the Ernst-Happel-Stadion.

=== Cinema ===
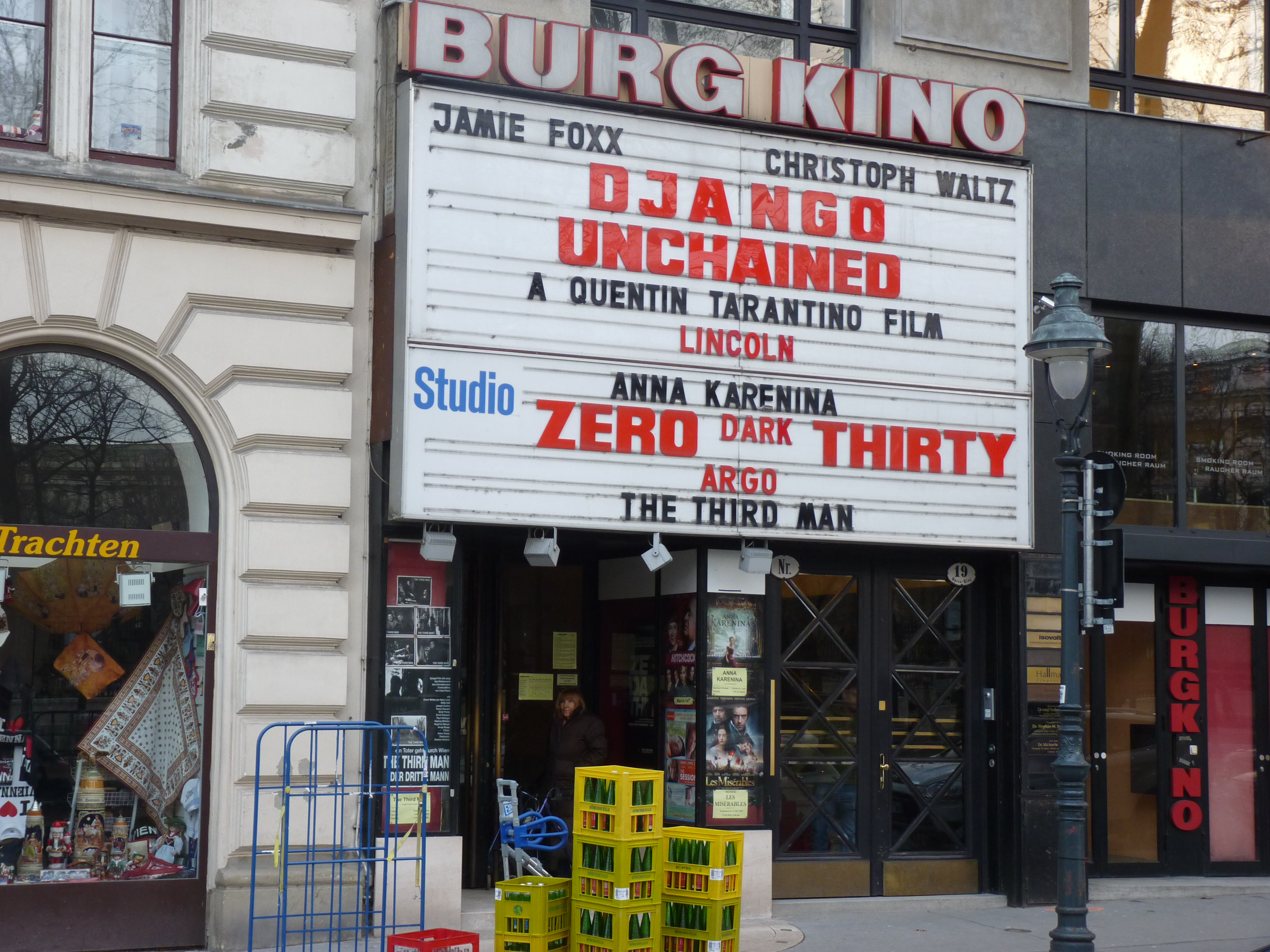
The entrance to the Burg Kino on the Ring

Films set in Vienna include Amadeus, Before Sunrise, The Third Man, The Living Daylights and Mission: Impossible – Rogue Nation.

Notable actors born in the city include Hedy Lamarr, Christoph Waltz, Christiane Hörbiger, Eric Pohlmann, Boris Kodjoe, Christine Buchegger, Senta Berger, and Christine Ostermayer. Many filmmakers, such as Michael Haneke and Fritz Lang, were born in Vienna. Billy Wilder and Otto Preminger also lived in the city, with Preminger studying and beginning his career there.

Vienna's cinemas include the Apollo Kino and Cineplexx Donauzentrum and many English language cinemas, including the Haydn Kino, Artis International and the Burg Kino, which screens The Third Man, a 1949 film set in Vienna, three times a week.

Every October since 1960, the city has hosted the Viennale, an international film festival that screens a wide range of genres of films and hosts many premieres.

=== Literature ===
Notable writers from Vienna include Carl Julius Haidvogel, Franz Grillparzer, and Stefan Zweig.

Writers who lived and worked in Vienna include Ingeborg Bachmann, Thomas Bernhard, Elias Canetti, Ernst von Feuchtersleben, Elfriede Jelinek, Franz Kafka, Karl Kraus, Robert Musil, Arthur Schnitzler, and Bertha von Suttner.

=== Science ===
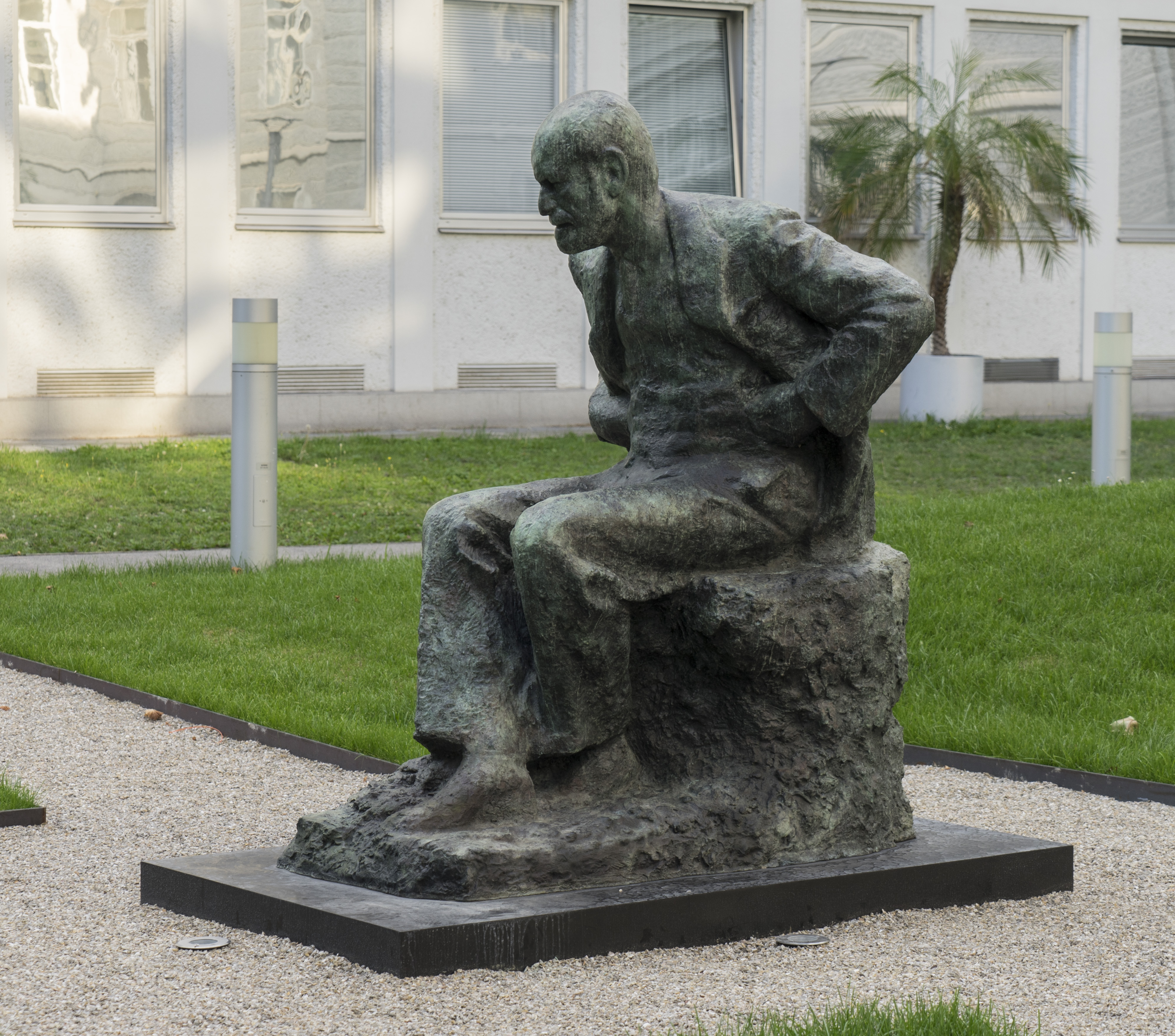
A monument to Sigmund Freud at the Medical University of Vienna

Scientists and intellectuals who were born, lived, or worked in Vienna include:

- Biology: Konrad Lorenz, Karl von Frisch, Max Perutz
- Computer Science: Heinz Zemanek
- Chemistry: Karl Kordesch, Walter Kohn, Carl and Gerti Cori, Richard Kuhn
- Economics: Eugen Böhm von Bawerk, Ludwig von Mises, Friedrich Hayek, Rudolf Hilferding
- Engineering: Viktor Kaplan, Robert Adler, Paul Eisler, Siegfried Marcus
- Jurisprudence: Hans Kelsen, Karl Renner
- Mathematics: Kurt Gödel
- Medicine: Ignaz Semmelweis, Ferdinand von Hebra, Karl Landsteiner, Hans Asperger, Carl von Rokitansky, Julius Wagner-Jauregg, Robert Bárány, Theodor Billroth, Karl Koller
- Philosophy: Karl Popper, Ludwig Wittgenstein, Paul Feyerabend, Moritz Schlick
- Physics: Lise Meitner, Erwin Schrödinger, Wolfgang Pauli, Ludwig Boltzmann, Victor Franz Hess, Ernst Mach, Christian Doppler, Josef Stefan, Anton Zeilinger
- Psychology: Sigmund Freud, Alfred Adler, Viktor Frankl
- Sociology: Karl Polanyi, Otto Bauer, Max Adler

=== Museums ===
In 2017 and 2021, representative opinion polls for Austria showed that Austrians consider Viennese museums as one of the strongest stakeholders contributing to making Vienna liveable.

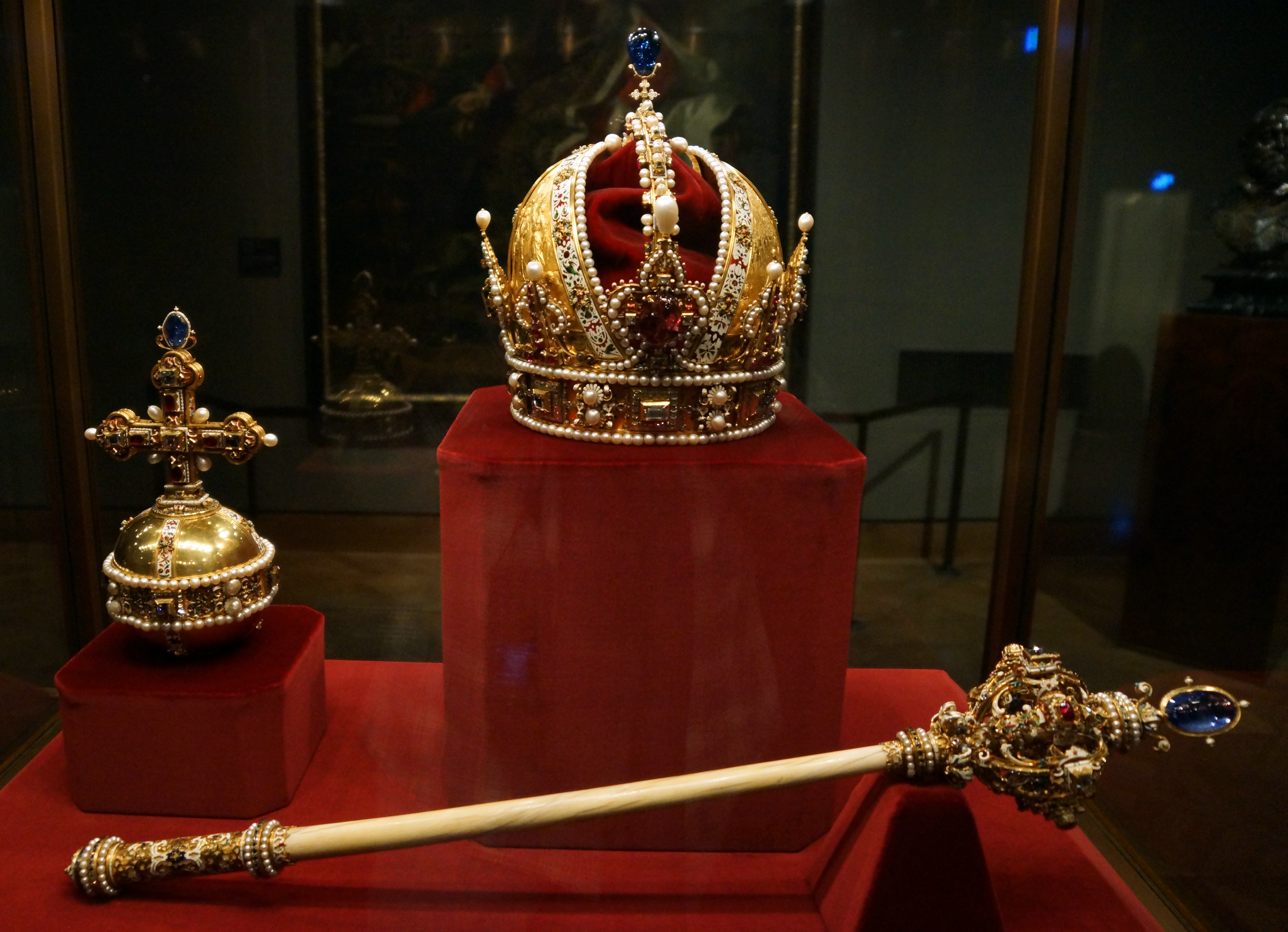
The Imperial Crown, Orb, and Sceptre of Austria in the Imperial Treasury

The majority of museums in Vienna are located in an area on the border of Innere Stadt and Neubau in the centre of the city, from the museums inside the Hofburg to the MuseumsQuartier, with the twin Naturhistorisches Museum and Kunsthistorisches Museum in between. This area is home to many museums, such as:

- In and around the Hofburg:
  - Imperial Treasury: A collection of European treasures, including the Imperial Regalia of the Holy Roman Emperor and the Imperial Crown of Austria
  - Sisi Museum: Dedicated to Empress Elisabeth of Austria, allowing visitors to view the imperial apartments.
  - Weltmuseum Wien: An anthropological museum housing many ethnographic objects from Africa, America, Asia, and Oceania, such as Moctezuma's headdress.
  - House of Austrian History
  - Globe Museum
  - Esperanto Museum and Collection of Planned Languages
  - Austrian National Library
  - Ephesos Museum
  - Albertina: An art museum featuring approximately 65,000 drawings and one million old master prints, with works by Leonardo da Vinci, Claude Monet and Albrecht Dürer. Young Hare by Dürer is perhaps the most well-known painting in the museum.

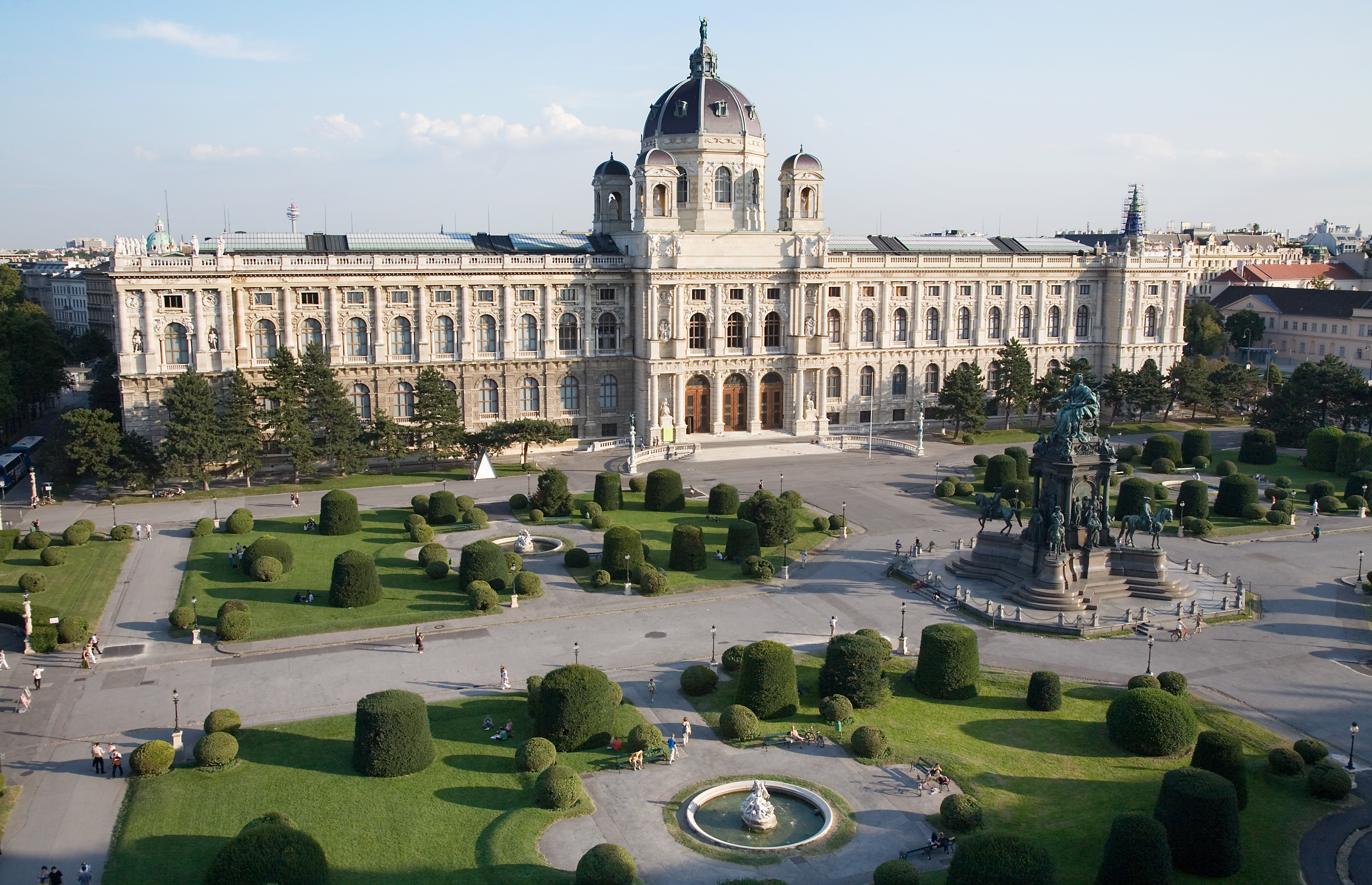
Kunsthistorisches Museum on Maria-Theresien-Platz

- On Maria-Theresien-Platz: Two almost identical buildings were completed in 1891 and opened by Emperor Franz Joseph I.
  - Kunsthistorisches Museum: an art museum featuring works from artists such as Pieter Bruegel the Elder, Caravaggio, Albrecht Dürer, Raphael, Rembrandt, Titian and Vermeer. Notable works include The (Great) Tower of Babel and The Hunters in the Snow (both by Bruegel),
  - Naturhistorisches Museum: A natural history museum with 30 million objects in its collection, of which 100,000 are on display. A notable exhibit is the Venus of Willendorf, a 25,000-year-old statue found in Austria.

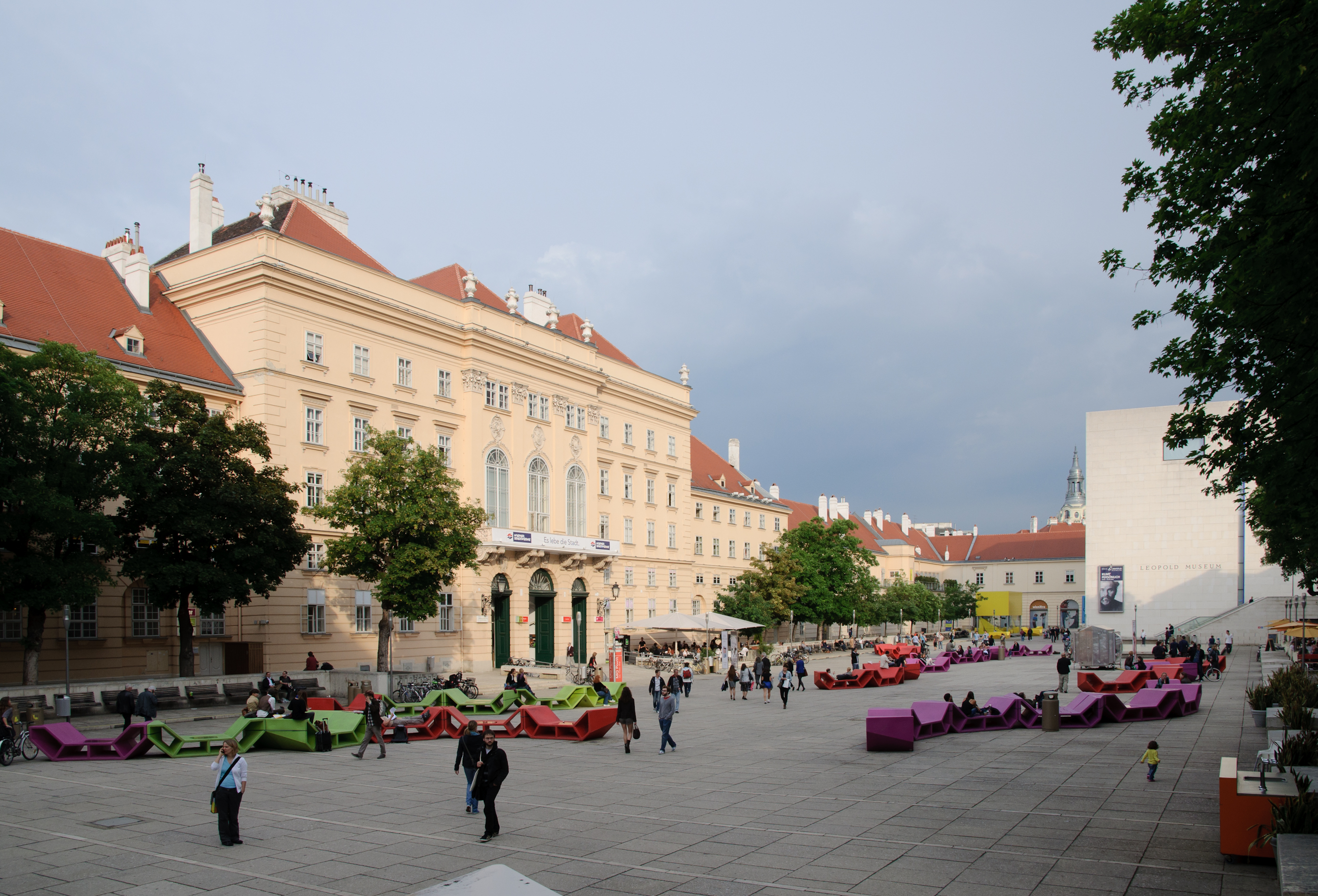
The MuseumsQuartier

- In the MuseumsQuartier: The former imperial stalls were converted to a group of museums in the late 1990s and opened in 2001.
  - MUMOK (Museum of Modern Art): A modern and contemporary art museum housing works from artists such as Andy Warhol, Roy Lichtenstein and Pablo Picasso.
  - Leopold Museum: A collection of modern Austrian art featuring works by Egon Schiele, Gustav Klimt, as well as pieces from Vienna Secession, Viennese Modernism and Austrian Expressionism.
  - Kunsthalle Wien
  - ZOOM Kindermuseum
  - Architekturzentrum Wien

The Österreichische Galerie Belvedere at the Belvedere presents art from Austria from the Middle Ages through the Baroque to the early 20th century, including The Kiss, Gustav Klimt's most famous work. It also houses the Baroque Museum with Franz Xaver Messerschmidt's famous character heads. In 2011, Belvedere 21 (formerly 21er Haus) was reopened in its immediate vicinity as a branch of contemporary art.

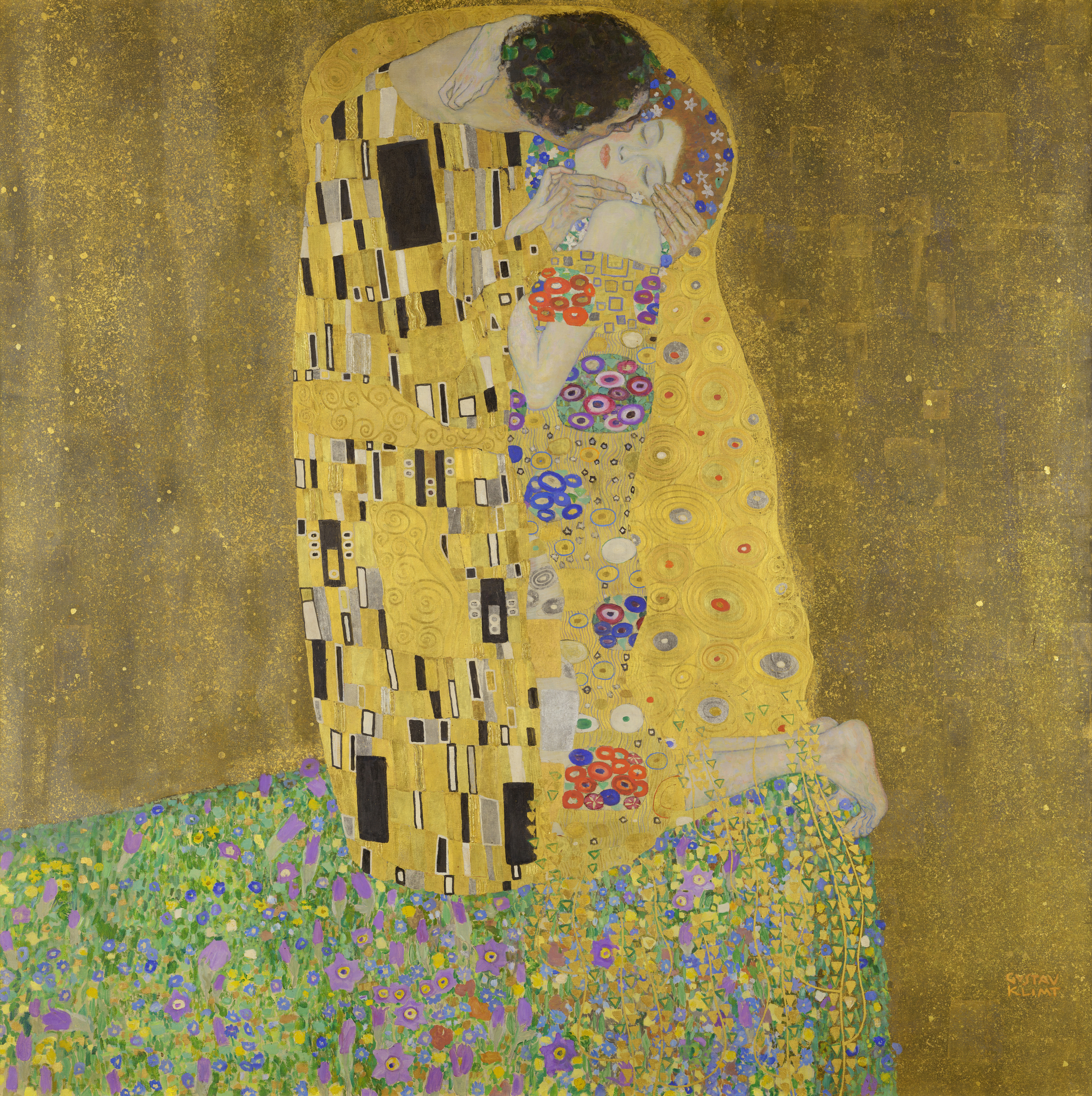
The Kiss in the Belvedere

The Vienna Museum documents the history of Vienna with a permanent presentation and temporary exhibitions and presents the memorials to Ludwig van Beethoven, Joseph Haydn, Wolfgang Amadeus Mozart, Franz Schubert, and Johann Strauss. Other branches of the museum include the Hermesvilla in the Lainzer Tiergarten, the Vienna Clock Museum, the Roman Museum, and the Prater Museum.

The former imperial summer residence at Schönbrunn Palace, Vienna's most visited attraction, is set up as a museum with the palace's showrooms and the Imperial Carriage Museum.

The Museum of Military History in the Arsenal is the leading museum of the Austrian Armed Forces and documents the history of the Austrian military with exhibits including weapons, armour, tanks, aircraft, uniforms, battle flags, paintings, medals and decorations, photographs, battleship models and documents.

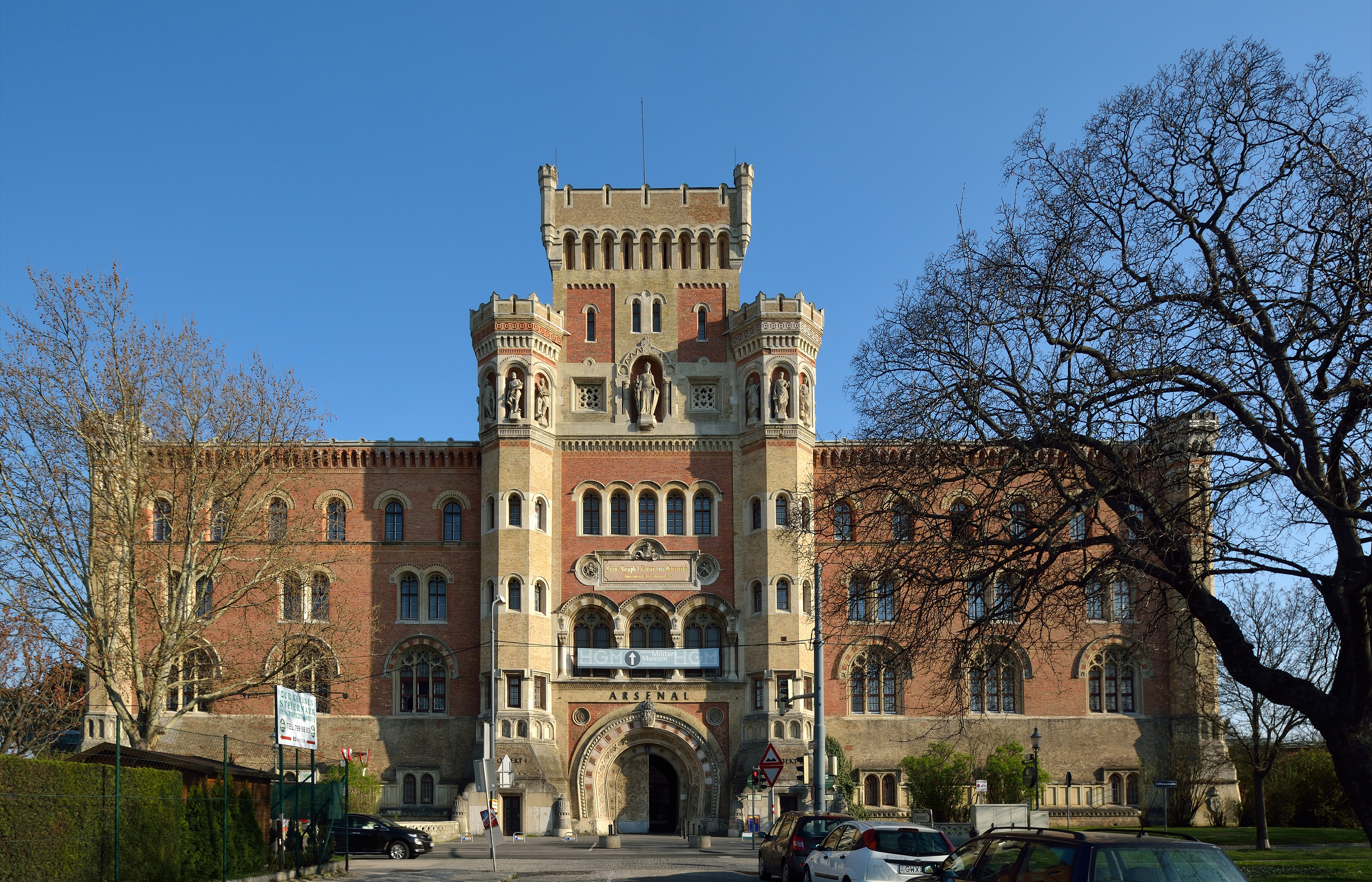
The Museum of Military History in the Arsenal

Other museums in the city include:

- House of Music, a music museum in the former palace of Archduke Charles, where Otto Nicolai, founder of the Vienna Philharmonic, once lived.
- Haus des Meeres, a public aquarium in a WWII flak tower.
- Museum of Art Fakes
- KunstHausWien
- Museum of Applied Arts
- Liechtenstein Museum
- Sigmund Freud Museum, a museum about Freud's life at his old residence.
- Mozarthaus Vienna
- Dritte Mann Museum, centred around the 1949 British film The Third Man, set in post-World War II Vienna
- Liechtenstein Museum
- Jewish Museum Vienna, founded in 1896, is the oldest of its kind.
- Money Museum, owned by the Austrian National Bank
- Museum of illusions

=== Architecture ===
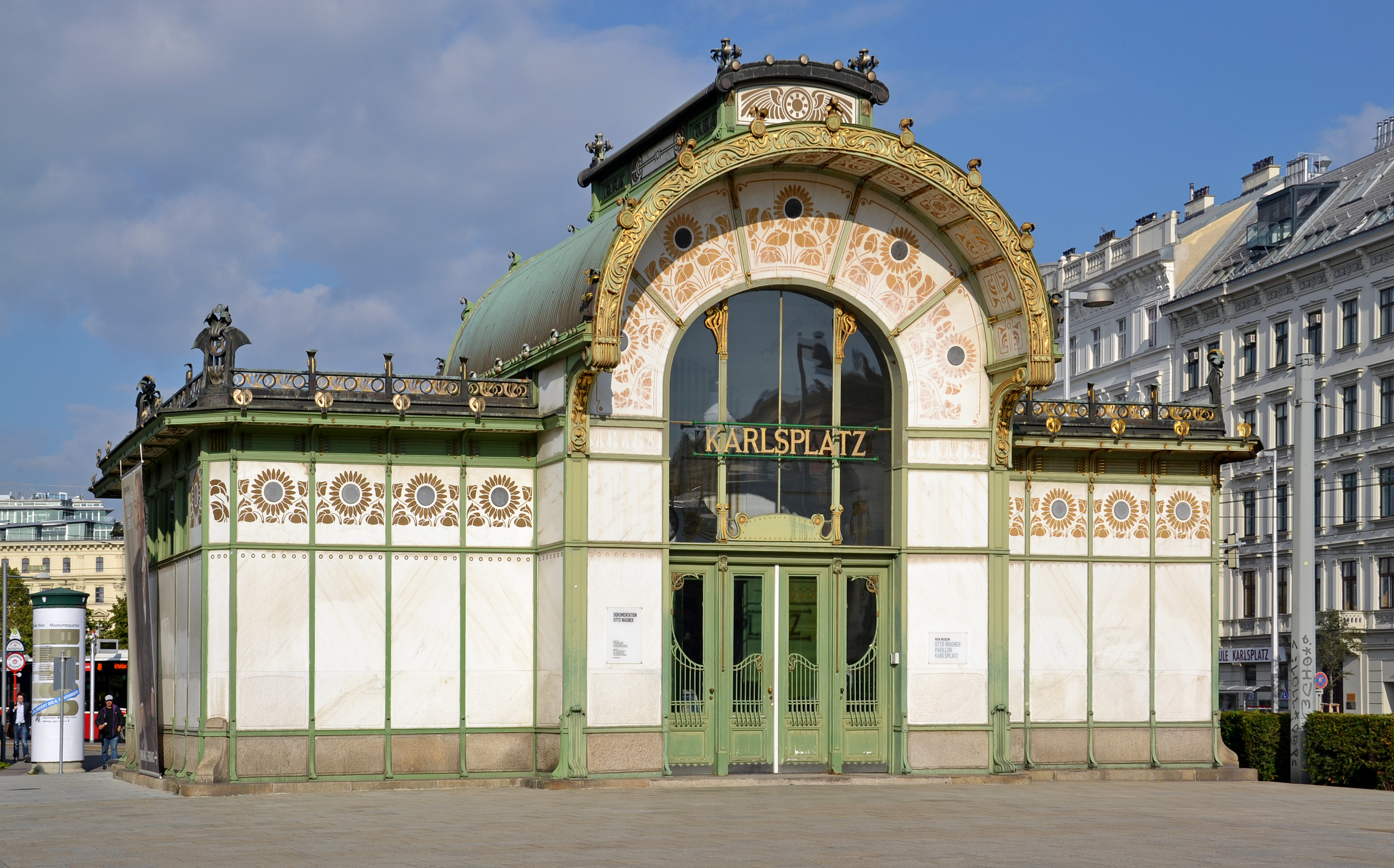
Karlsplatz Stadtbahn Station, designed in Art Nouveau style

A variety of architectural styles have been preserved in Vienna, including Romanesque and Baroque architecture. The Vienna Secession, an art movement closely related to Art Nouveau, has left many architectural traces in Vienna. Otto Wagner designed many buildings in the city, including the Secession building, Karlsplatz Stadtbahn Station, the Kirche am Steinhof, and the Austrian Postal Savings Bank, many of which rank among the best-known examples of Art Nouveau in the world.

The Wiener Moderne shunned the use of extraneous adornment. Architect Adolf Loos is responsible for the Looshaus (1909), the Kärntner Bar (1908), and the Steiner House (1910).

The Hundertwasserhaus by Friedensreich Hundertwasser, designed to counter the clinical look of modern architecture, is one of Vienna's most popular tourist attractions. Hundertwasser also designed the KunstHausWien and the Spittelau heating plant.

In the 1990s, several quarters were adapted and extensive building projects were implemented in the areas around Donaustadt and Wienerberg. Vienna has seen numerous architectural projects completed, which combine modern architectural elements with old buildings, such as the remodeling and revitalization of the old Gasometer in 2001.

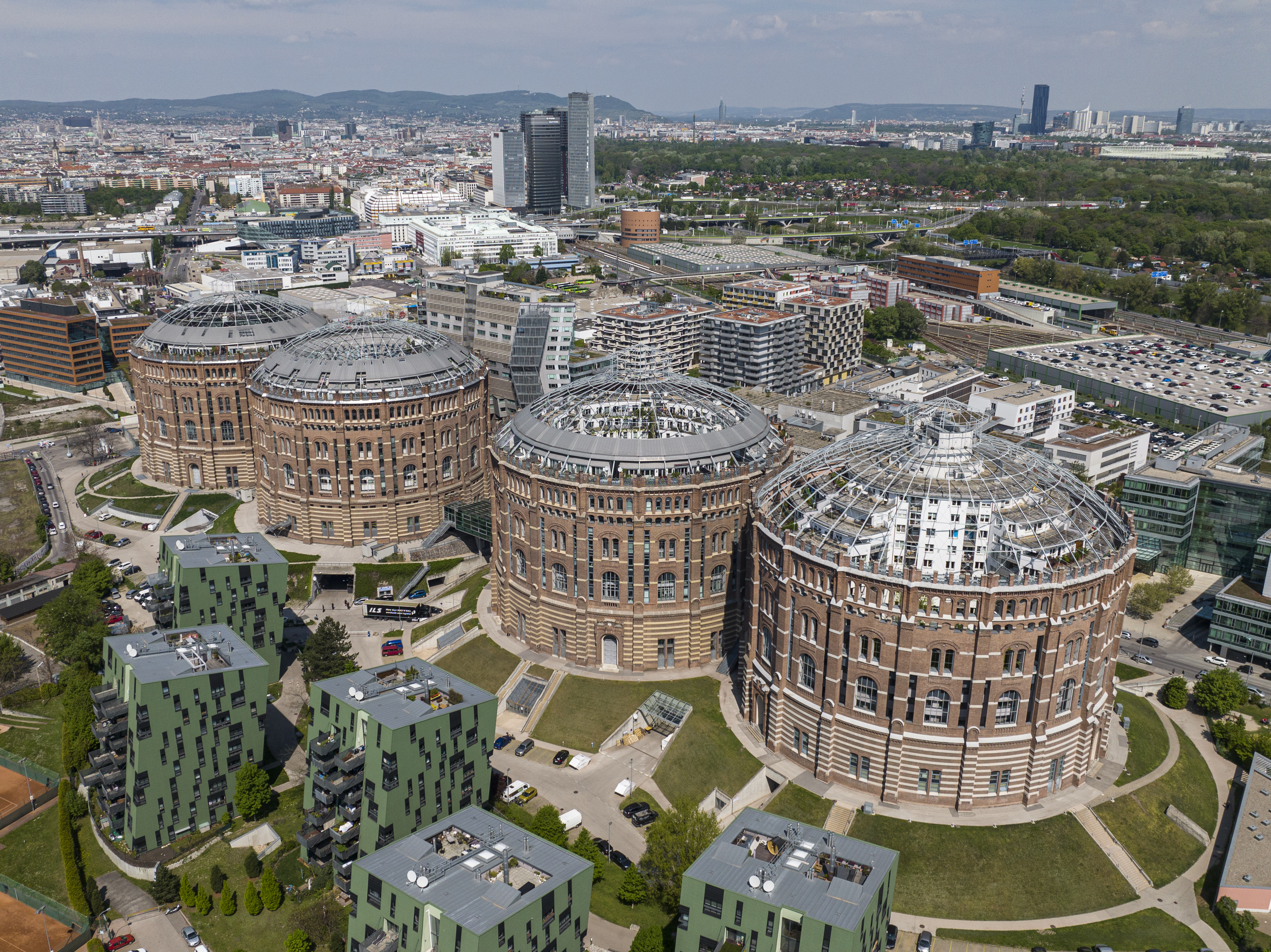
Gasometer in Simmering

The DC Towers are located on the northern bank of the Danube and were completed in 2013.

=== Places of worship ===
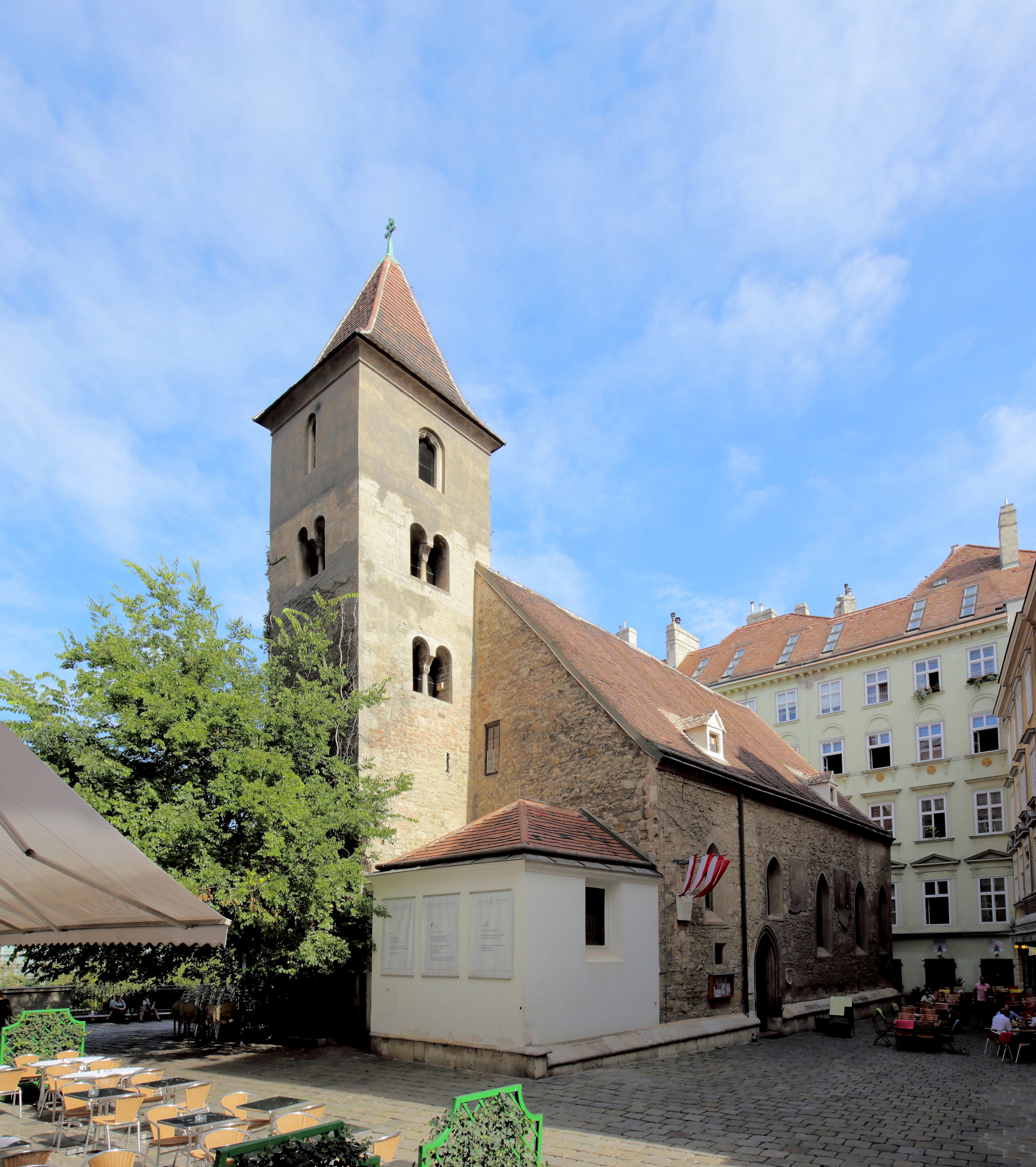
St. Rupert's Church, the oldest in Vienna

Due to the prevalence of Christianity in the city, most places of worship are churches and cathedrals. Most notable are:

- St. Rupert's Church (ca. 800), considered the oldest church in the city.
- St. Stephen's Cathedral (1137), the Gothic mother church of the Roman Catholic Archdiocese of Vienna, one of the city's most recognizable symbols. Located in the Stephansplatz in the center of town, it is a popular tourist attraction.
- Schottenkirche (12th century), founded by Irish Benedictine monks as the parish church of the Schottenstift.
- Maria am Gestade (1414), one of Vienna's oldest churches and an example of Gothic architecture.
- Capuchin Church (1632), home to the Imperial Crypt, the burial site of many members of the Habsburg family.
- Karlskirche (1737), a Baroque church in the Karlsplatz and a popular tourist attraction.
- Peterskirche (early 18th century), located near the Graben and a major tourist destination.
- Votivkirche (1879), built on the Ringstraße as an expression of gratitude after Emperor Franz Joseph survived an assassination attempt in 1853.
- St. Francis of Assisi Church (1910), a Basilica-style church on the bank of the Danube on the Mexikoplatz, is administered by the Order of the Holy Trinity.

Other notable churches include the Augustinian Church, the Church of St. Maria Rotunda, the Church of St. Leopold, the Franciscan Church, the Jesuit Church and the Minoritenkirche.

Vienna's biggest mosque is the Vienna Islamic centre in Kaisermühlen, which is financed by the Muslim World League. The mosque features a 32-metre-high minaret and a dome 16 metres high, with a 20-metre radius. In addition, there are over 100 further mosques in the city.

Before the November pogroms of 1938, also known as the Kristallnacht, Vienna had 24 synagogues and 78 prayer houses. Only one synagogue, the Stadttempel, survived the destruction.

=== Ball dances ===
The first balls in Vienna were held in the 18th century. The ball season takes place annually during Carnival, running from 11 November to Shrove Tuesday. Many balls are held in the Hofburg, Rathaus and Musikverein. Guests adhere to a strict dress code; men are required to wear black or white tie, while women must wear ball gowns. Debutants of the ball wear white.

The balls are opened with dances, traditionally including a Viennese waltz, at around 22:00, and close at about 05:00 the next morning. Food served at the balls includes sausages with bread, and goulash.

Notable Viennese balls include the Vienna Opera Ball, the Vienna Ball of Sciences, the Wiener Akademikerball, and the Hofburg Silvesterball.

The Wiener Akademikerball in the Hofburg has attracted lots of controversy for being a gathering for far-right politicians and groups. The ball is hosted by the FPÖ, the right-wing populist party of Austria, and has attracted multiple right-wing and far-right personalities, such as Martin Sellner and Marine Le Pen. Since 2008, annual demonstrations organised by various groups have protested against the event. Former leader of the FPÖ Heinz-Christian Strache compared anti-fascist protesters to a Nazi mob, alleging that the ball attendees were being treated as "new Jews".

=== Language ===
Vienna is part of the Austro-Bavarian language area, in particular Central Bavarian (Mittelbairisch). The Viennese dialect takes many loanwords from languages of the former Habsburg Monarchy, especially Czech. The dialect differs from the west of Austria in its pronunciation and grammar. Features typical of Viennese German include Monophthongization, the transformation of a diphthong into a monophthong (German heiß (hot) into Viennese haas) and the lengthening of vowels (Heeaasd, i bin do ned bleeed, wooos waaasn ii, wea des woooa (Standard German Hörst du, ich bin doch nicht blöd, was weiß denn ich, wer das war): "Listen, I'm not stupid; what do I know, who that was?"). Speakers of the dialect tend to avoid the genitive case.

=== LGBTQ ===
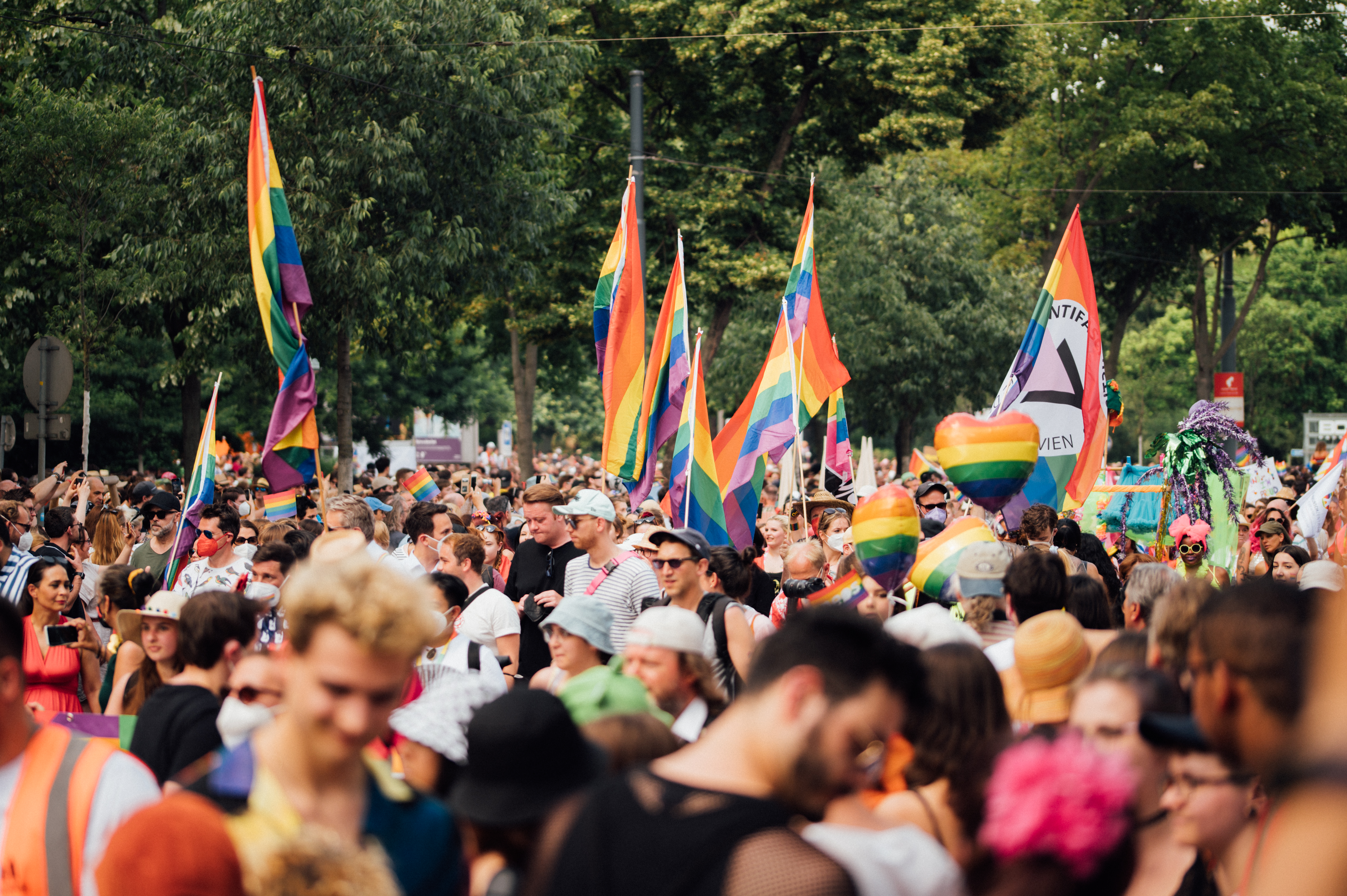
Vienna Pride 2021

Vienna is regarded as the centre of LGBTQ+ life in Austria. The city has implemented an action plan against homophobic discrimination and has maintained an anti-discrimination unit within its administration since 1998. The city has several cafés, bars, and clubs frequented by the LGBTQ+ community, including the Café Savoy, a traditional coffee house established in 1896. In 2015, ahead of hosting the Eurovision Song Contest, Vienna introduced traffic lights featuring same-sex couples, attracting international media attention. Multiple rainbow crossings are dotted around the city. Vienna's Pride Parade is held every June. In 2019, when the parade hosted EuroPride, it attracted around 500,000 visitors.

== Social infrastructure ==
=== Schools ===
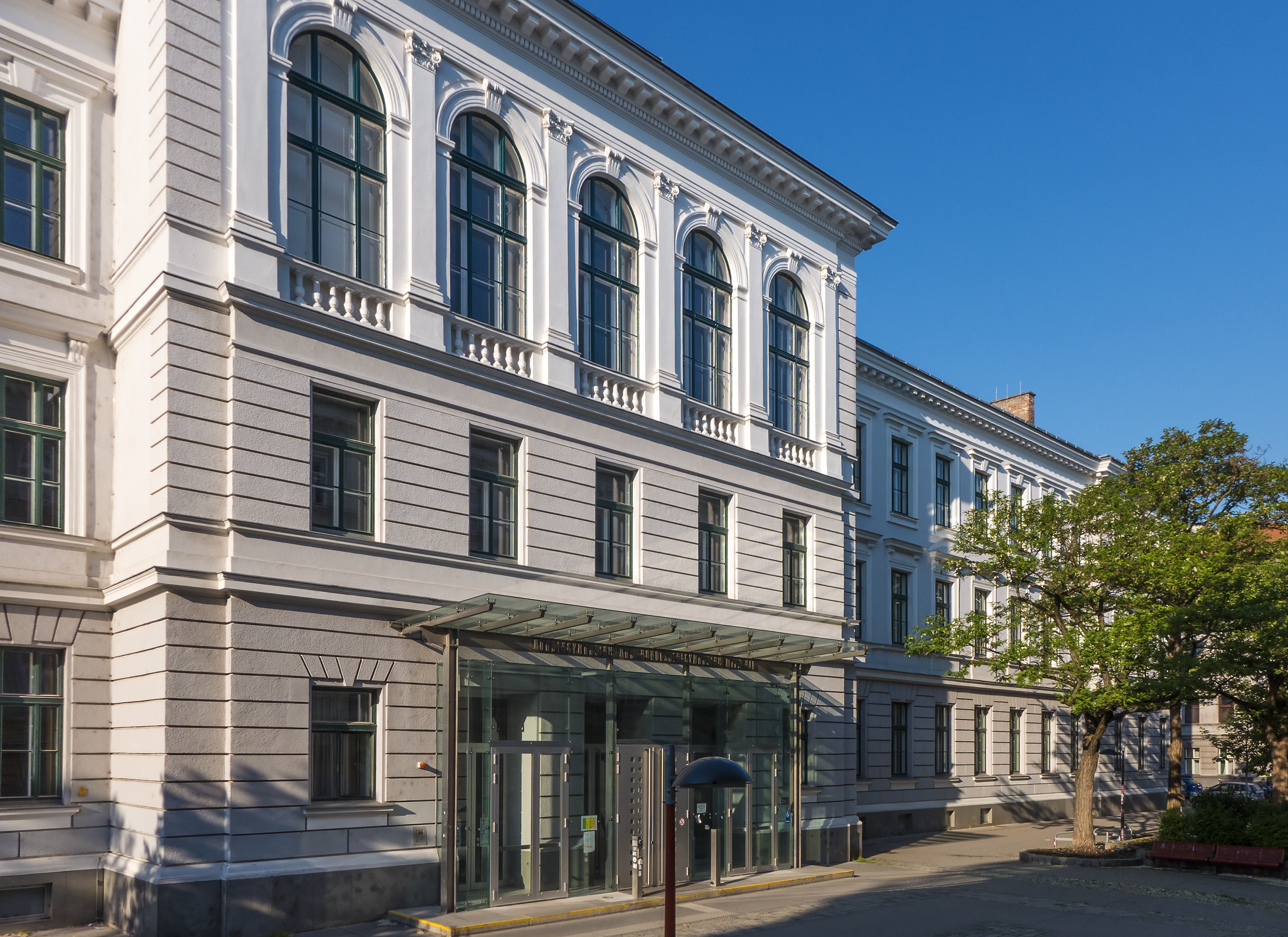
Gymnasium Rosasgasse, Meidling

As of the 2022/2023 school year, there were 457 compulsory education schools in Vienna, including 303 primary schools and 140 middle schools. Additionally, there are 98 high schools, 90 of which also include middle school education. Around 250,000 children are enrolled in the Viennese school system, which is staffed by almost 29,000 teachers.

Due partly to the numerous international offices in the city, Vienna is home to many international schools, including the Vienna International School, the American International School, the International Christian School, and the Lycée Français de Vienne.

=== Universities ===
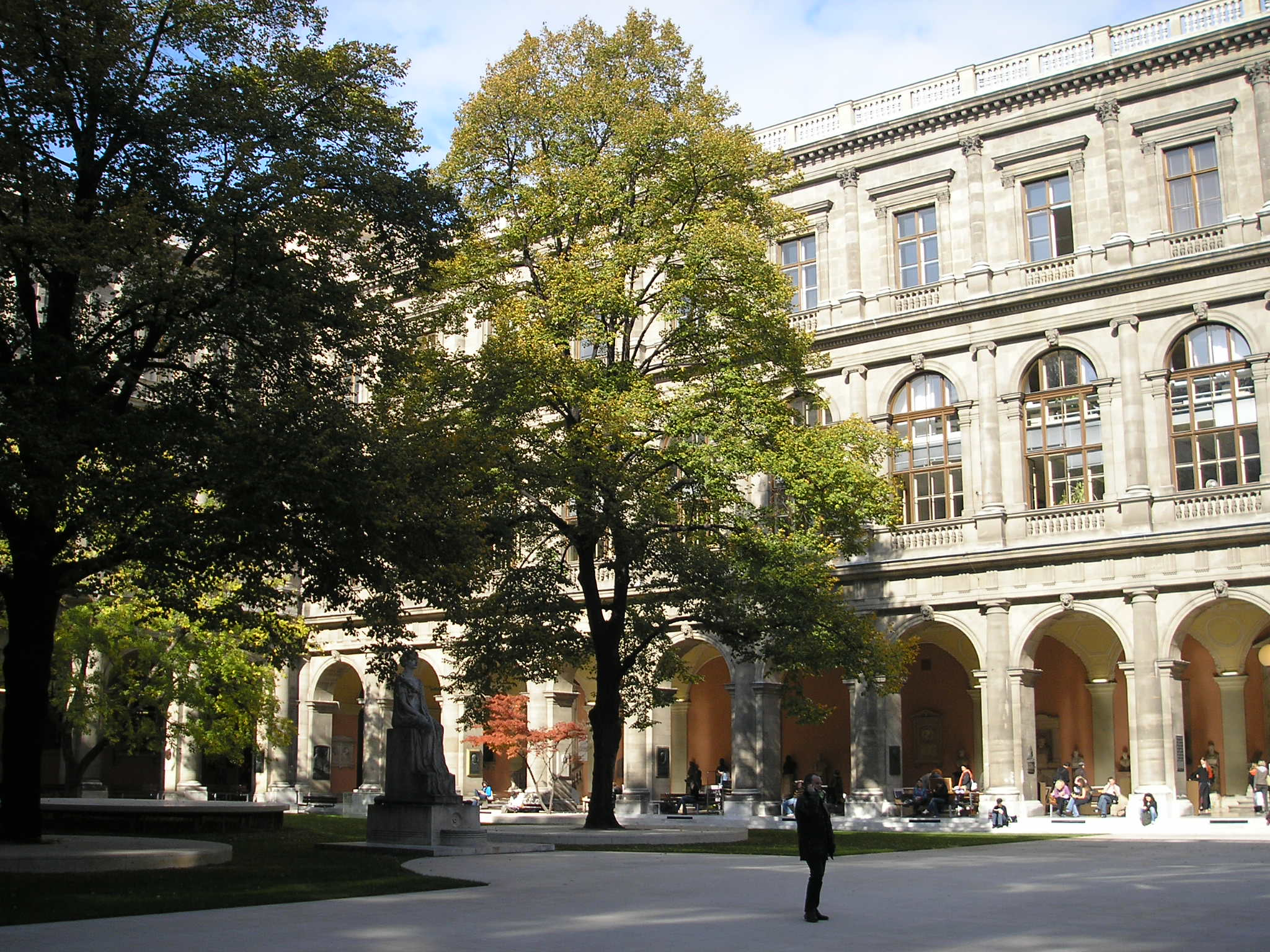
Main building of the University of Vienna

With 197,209 students enrolled in the winter semester of 2023/2024, Vienna has the largest student population of any city in the German-speaking world. The city is home to several historic universities. The University of Vienna, the oldest and largest university in the German-speaking world, was founded in 1365 by Duke Rudolph IV. Its medical faculty became independent as the Medical University of Vienna in 2004. Other prominent institutions include the Academy of Fine Arts (1692), the University of Veterinary Medicine (1765), and the University of Music and Performing Arts (1767). The 19th century saw the founding of the Vienna University of Technology (TU), the University of Natural Resources and Life Sciences (BOKU) and the University of Economics and Business (WU). The University of Applied Arts, founded in 1867, gained university status in 1970.

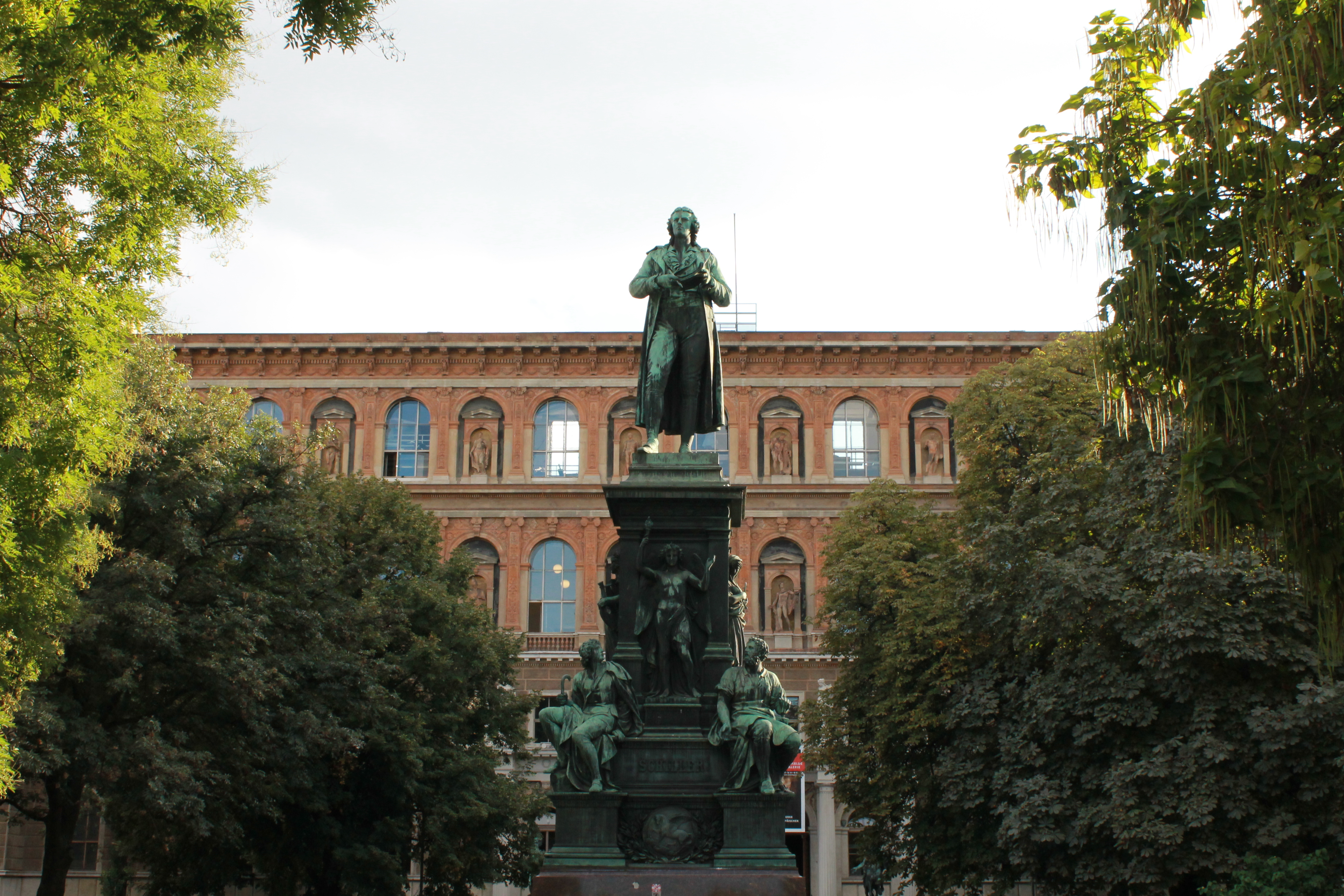
A statue of Friedrich Schiller in front of the Academy of Fine Arts

In addition to these public universities, Vienna also hosts several private universities, including Webster Vienna Private University, the Music and Arts University of the City of Vienna and, since 2019, the Central European University, as well as several universities of applied sciences.

In 2017 and 2021, representative opinion polls for Austria showed that Austrians consider Viennese universities as one of the strongest stakeholders contributing to making Vienna liveable.

=== Libraries ===
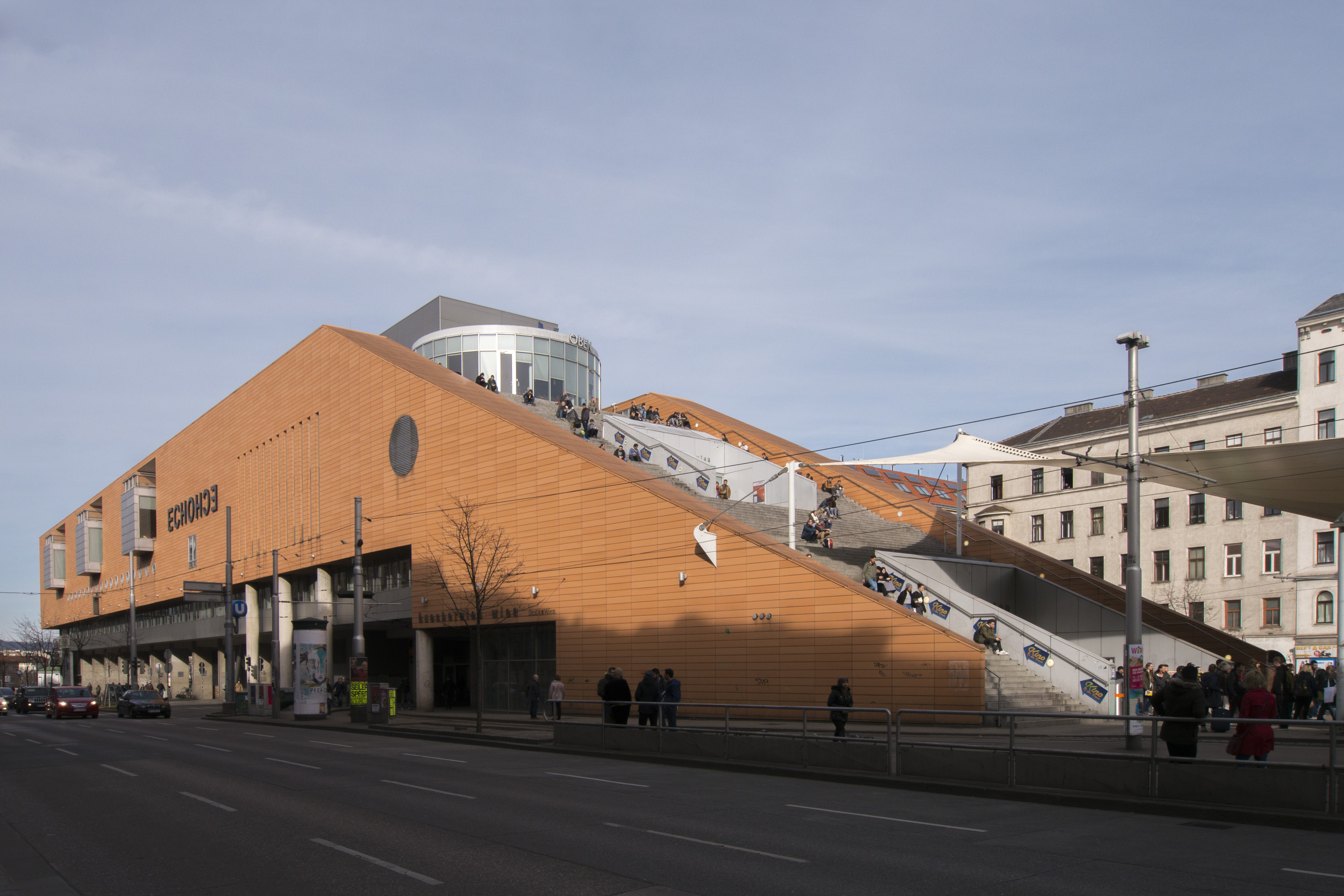
The Hauptbücherei

Vienna's public library system, the Wiener Büchereien, comprises 39 lending libraries, including the Hauptbücherei (Main Library), which serves as the central hub. Located at Urban-Loritz-Platz along the Gürtel, it sits at the intersection of the districts Rudolfsheim-Fünfhaus and Neubau. Alongside books, the libraries offer CDs, DVDs, computer games, cassettes, magazines, and digital ebooks, as well as study spaces and literary events.

Beyond its public libraries, Vienna hosts several academic and research libraries. The Austrian National Library, situated in the Hofburg, is the largest in the country and holds extensive historical and cultural collections. Other institutions include the Vienna University Library, the Vienna City Library in the Rathaus, and the libraries of major universities such as the University of Economics and Business, the Technical University, and the Medical University. Additionally, the city is home to specialised libraries, including the Social Science Study Library of the Chamber of Labour and the Parliamentary Library, which cater to specific fields of research and policy.

=== Healthcare ===
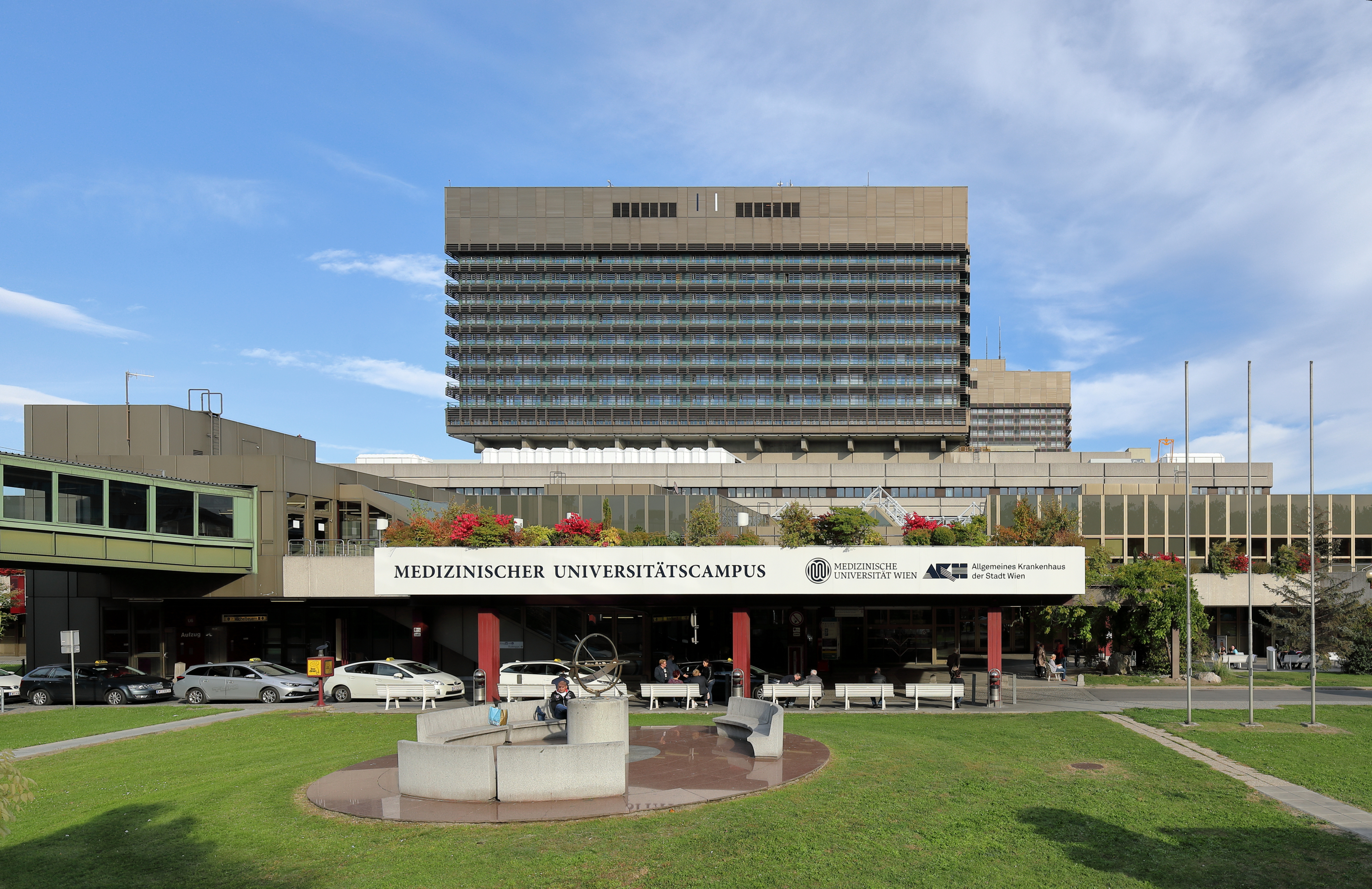
The AKH

In 2020, Vienna had 729.3 hospital beds and 696.8 doctors per 100,000 inhabitants. The General Hospital (Allgemeines Krankenhaus, known as AKH) in Alsergrund is the largest hospital in Austria and serves as the teaching hospital for the Medical University of Vienna. The city is home to 7 public hospitals and 8 care homes managed by the municipality, in addition to 17 privately operated non-profit hospitals and numerous private healthcare facilities.

=== Social institutions ===
The first social institutions in Vienna were established in the early 20th century. Due to widespread poverty, homeless shelters and men's hostels were built, such as the one opened in 1905 on Meldemannstraße, where the young Adolf Hitler lived from 1910 to 1913. Today, approximately 200,000 people in Vienna live below the poverty line. Non-profit organizations such as Volkshilfe and Caritas provide support. Caritas operates the homeless shelter "Die Gruft" in Mariahilf, which has been in existence since 1986. Streetwork services are offered to young people, and the Wiener Sozialdienste (Vienna Social Services) carry out a range of charitable tasks.

=== Housing ===
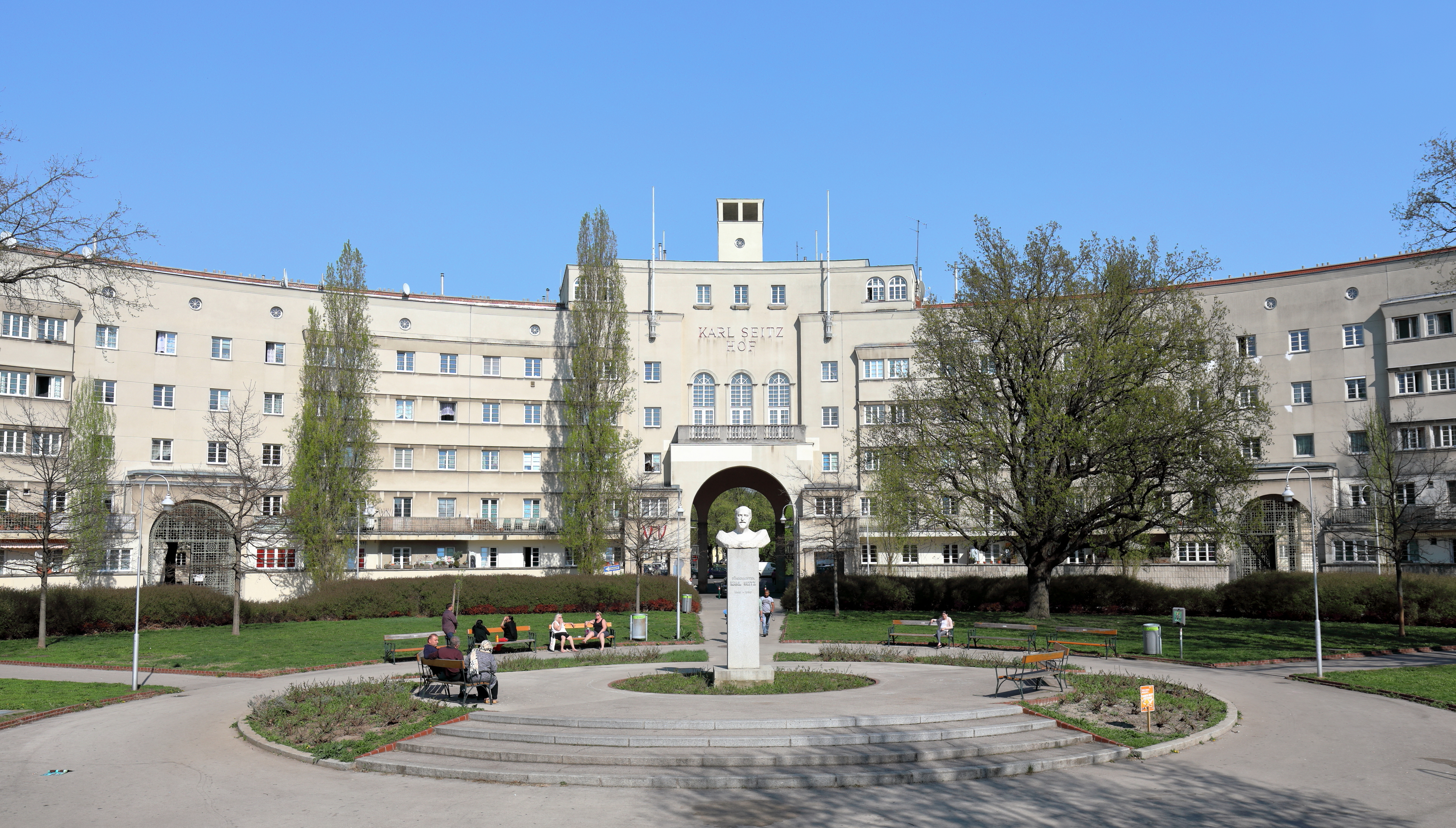
Gemeindebau Karl-Seitz-Hof in Floridsdorf

Gemeindebauten are public housing complexes owned by the city, primarily constructed during the period of Red Vienna in the early 20th century, as part of a large-scale social housing program aimed at providing affordable homes to working-class families. Famous examples include Karl-Marx-Hof. As symbols of socialism, these buildings are often named after socialist or social-democratic politicians such as Friedrich Engels, Ferdinand Lassalle, Olof Palme, and Victor Adler, or other notable figures, including George Marshall, Dag Hammarskjöld, and George Washington. The Gemeindebauten often featured additional community facilities, such as municipal libraries, daycare centres, laundromats, indoor pools, and shopping centres. The classic Gemeindebau from the interwar period are typically designed in block perimeter development, with a large entrance gate leading to an inner courtyard, featuring a green space with playgrounds. They continue to serve as affordable housing to this day.

The remaining half of the socialised housing stock in Vienna is limited-profit housing associations (LPHAs), a kind of housing which can be established either as a private company, or a housing cooperative, which are only allowed to charge cost-covering rents.

== Nature ==
=== Parks ===
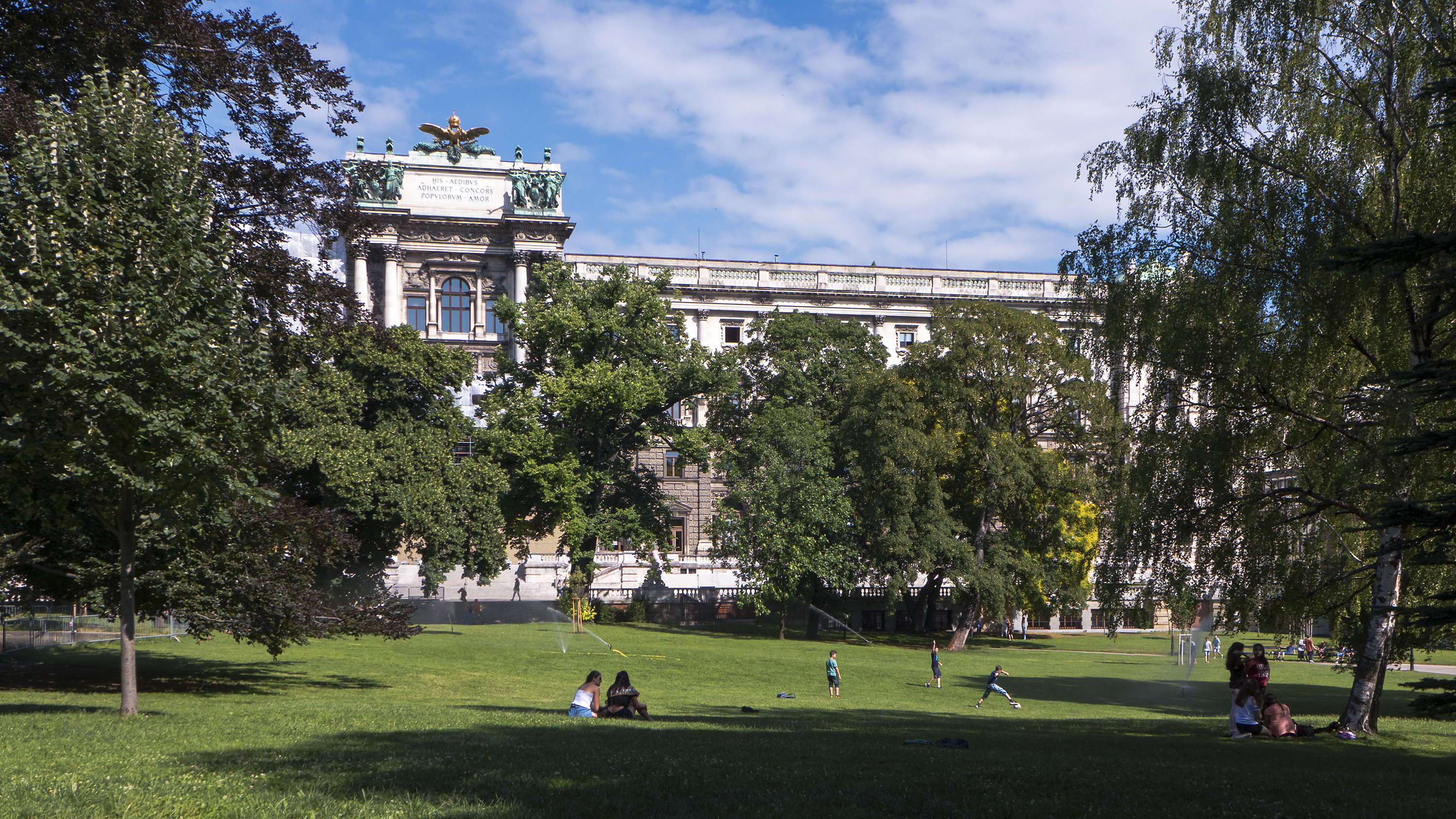
The Burggarten, facing the back of the Hofburg

On the southeastern outer border of the Ringstraße lies the Stadtpark. The park covers an area of about 28 acres and is split in half by the river Wien. It contains monuments to various Viennese artists, most notably the gilded bronze monument of Johann Strauß II. On the other side of the Ring is the Burggarten, just behind the Hofburg, which features a monument to Mozart as well as a greenhouse. On the other side of the Hofburg is the Volksgarten, home to a small-scale replica of the Temple of Hephaestus and a cultivated flower garden. On the other side of the road, in front of the Rathaus, is the Rathauspark, which hosts the Christmas Christkindlmarkt.

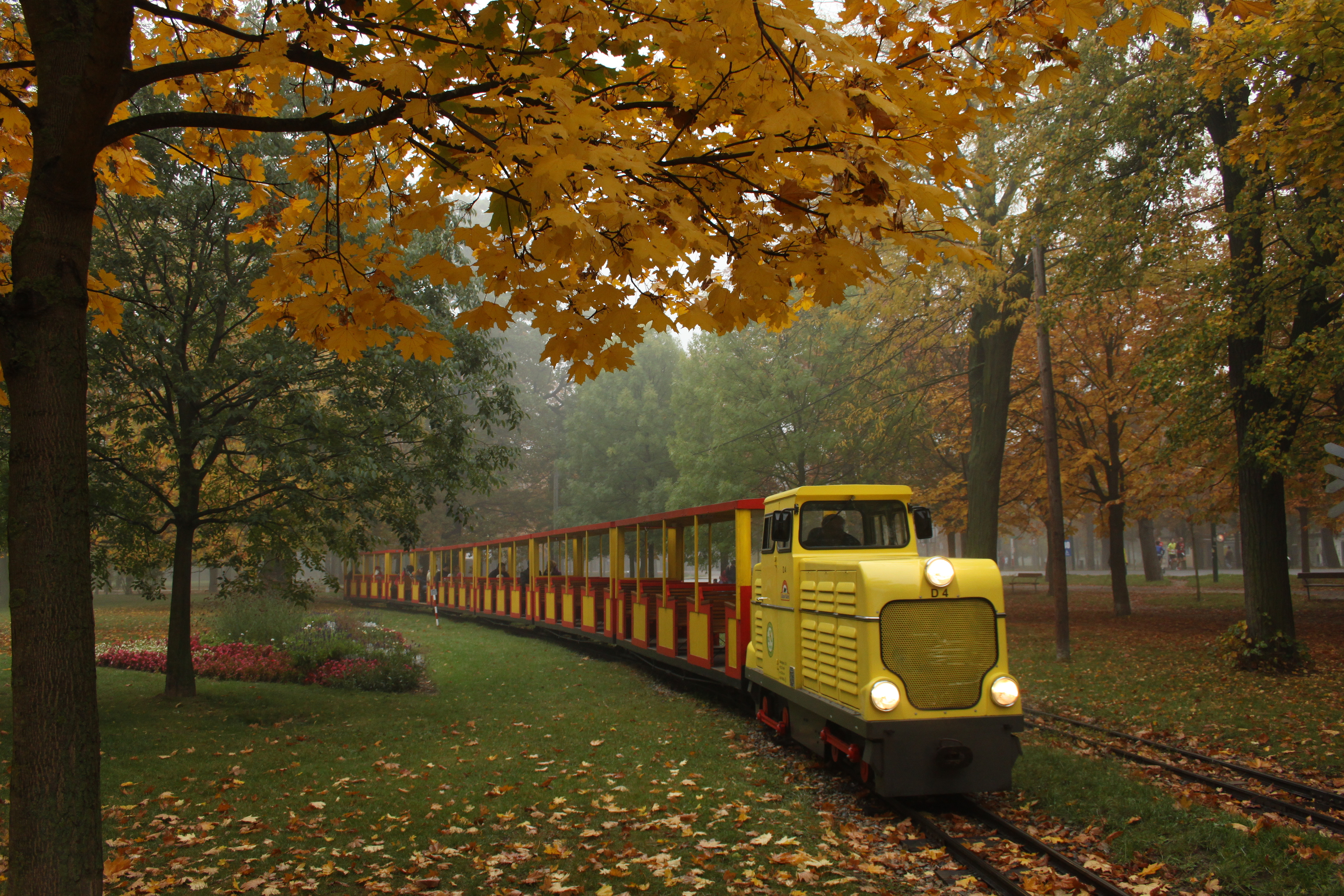
Locomotive D4 of the Prater Liliputbahn

The Prater is a large public park in Leopoldstadt. Within the park is the Wurstelprater (colloquially known as “the Prater”), a public amusement park that contains the Wiener Riesenrad, a 64.75-meter-tall (212.4 ft) Ferris wheel, along with various rides, roller coasters, carousels and a Madame Tussauds. The rest of the park is covered by forest. The Hauptallee, a wide, car-free alley lined with horse chestnut trees, runs through the park. Eliud Kipchoge broke the marathon distance record on this road in the INEOS 1:59 Challenge in October 2019. The Prater also is home to the Liliputbahn, a railway line primarily used by tourists, and a planetarium. It was the location of the 1873 Vienna World's Fair. In 1931, the Ernst-Happel-Stadion, formerly known as the Praterstadion, was opened in the Prater.

The grounds of the imperial Schönbrunn Palace contain an 18th-century park which includes the Schönbrunn Zoo, which was founded in 1752, making it the world's oldest zoo still in operation. The zoo is one of the few to house giant pandas. The park also features the Palmenhaus Schönbrunn, a large greenhouse with around 4,500 plant species.

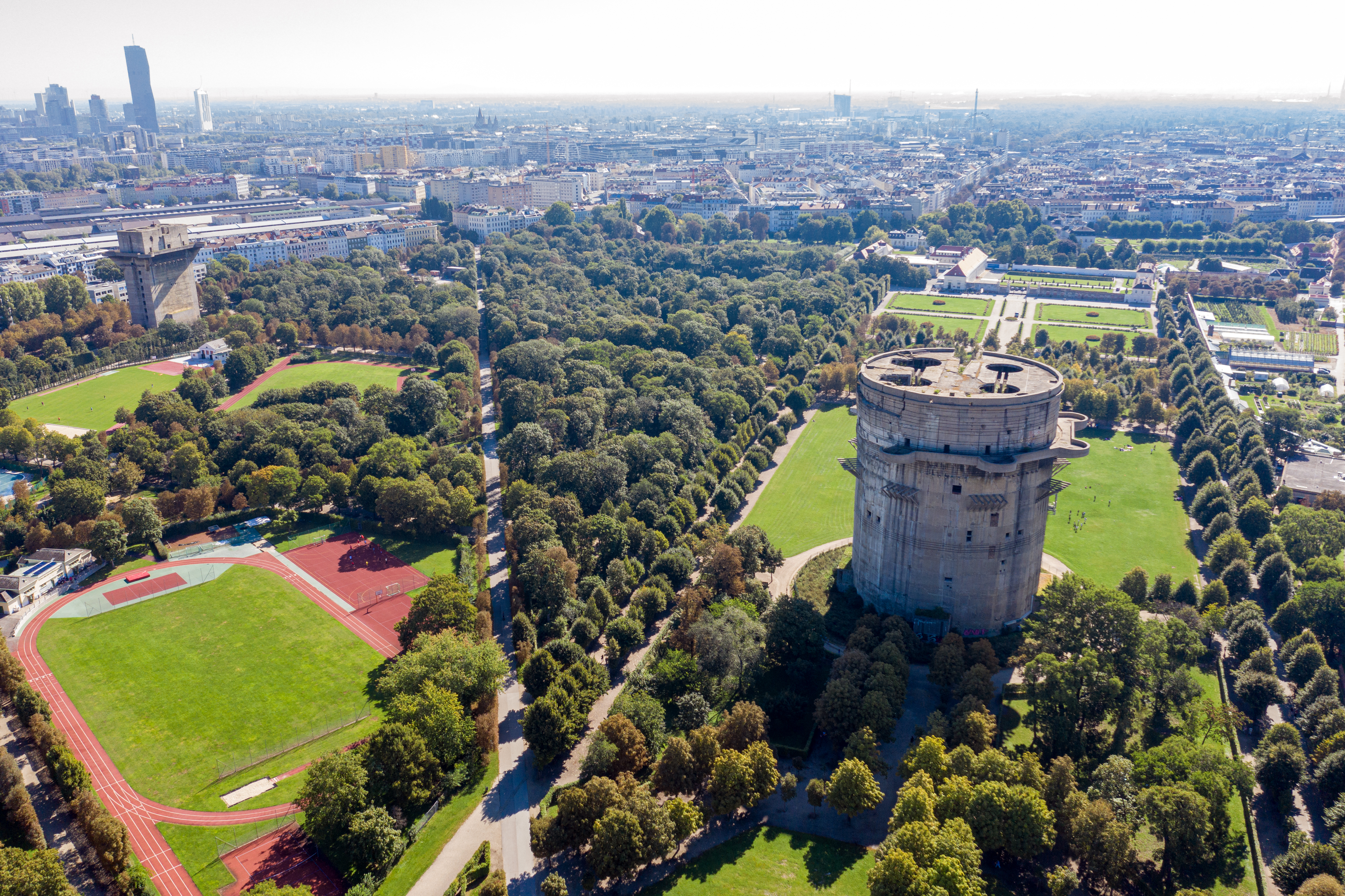
A flak tower in the Augarten

The Augarten in Leopoldstadt, on the border of Brigittenau, is a 129-acre French Baroque-style public park open during the day. The park is home to flower gardens and multiple tree-lined avenues. The park was opened in 1775 by Joseph II and is surrounded by a wall with five gates, which are shut at night. The baroque Palais Augarten, in the south of the park, is home to the Vienna Boys' Choir. Towering over the park are two anti-aircraft flak towers, built by the Nazis in 1944. After the war, the towers were unable to be destroyed, so they were left standing. They now stand empty and serve no function, though various other such towers in the city were repurposed, such as the Haus des Meeres in Esterhazy Park.

The Donauinsel, part of Vienna's flood defences, is a 21.1 km (13.1 mi) long artificial island between the Danube and New Danube dedicated to leisure activities. It was constructed from 1972 to 1988 for flood protection measures. Sporting amenities, such as volleyball courts, playgrounds, skate spots, dog parks, and multiple toilet facilities, some with showers, are available on the island. To transform the island into a green space, approximately 1.8 million trees and shrubs, along with 170 hectares of forest, were planted. A few hundred Japanese cherry trees were planted as a symbol of friendship between Austria and Japan. Animals on the island include sand lizards and Danube crested newts.

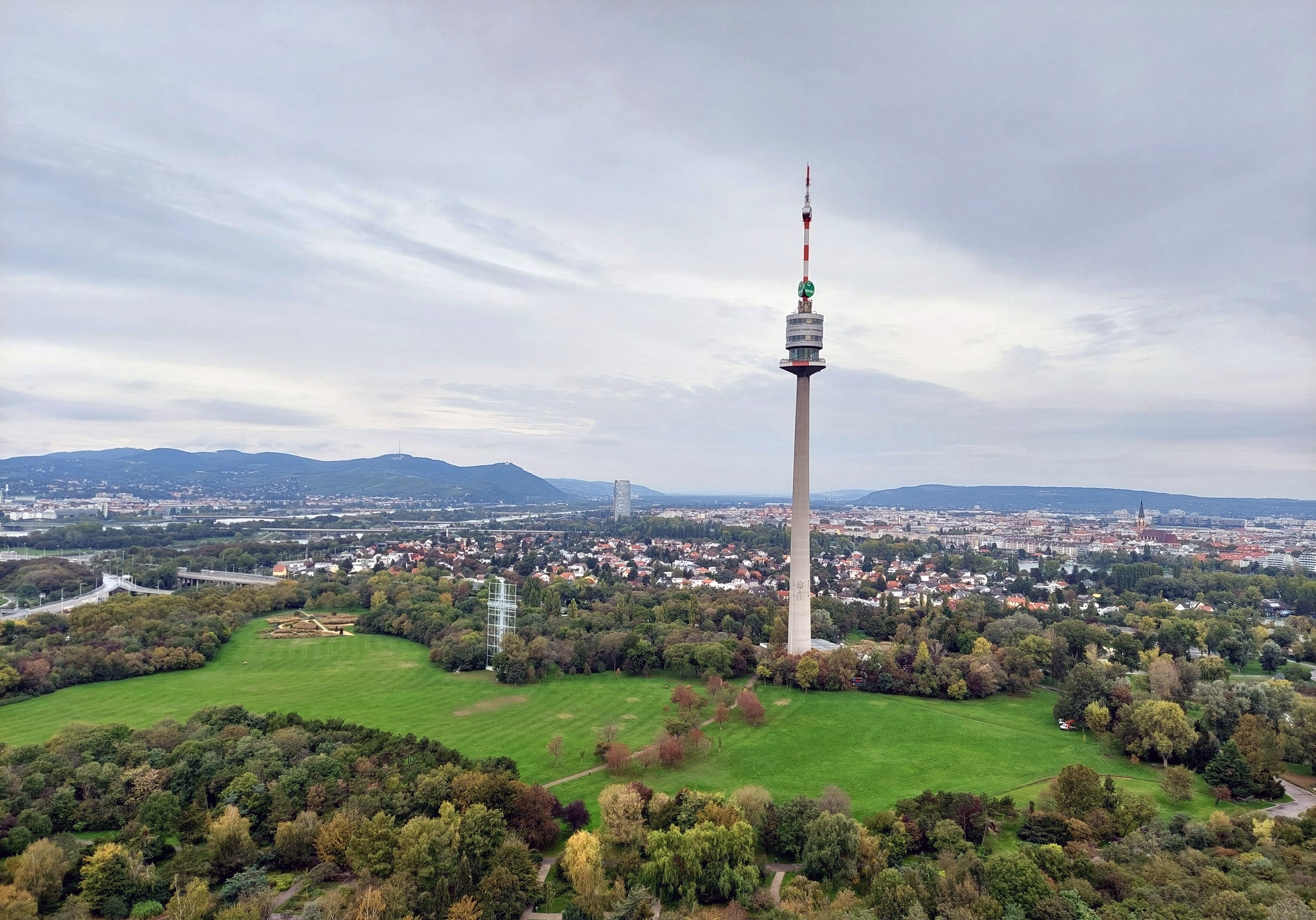
The Donauturm in the Donaupark.

The Donaupark is a 63-hectare park in Kaisermühlen, Donaustadt, between the New Danube and the Old Danube, next to the Vienna International Centre. The park features the Donauturm, the tallest structure in Austria at 252 metres, as well as a 40-metre-tall steel cross, erected in 1983 on the occasion of a holy mass held by Pope John Paul II during his visit to Austria. The park features memorials to multiple Latin American figures such as Salvador Allende, Simón Bolívar, and Che Guevara.

Other parks include the Türkenschanzpark, the Schweizergarten, and the Waldmüllerpark.

=== Woods ===
The Lobau, a floodplain in the southeast of the city, is a part of the wider Danube-Auen National Park. It is used for recreation and has many nudist areas. It is home to multiple species of animals:

- Mammals: beavers, deer, European hares, Eurasian water shrews
- Reptiles: European pond turtles, slow worm, grass snake
- Amphibians: European tree frogs, European fire-bellied toad
- Fish: pigo, rhodeus, white-finned gudgeon
- Birds: grey herons, cormorants, common kingfishers, white-tailed eagles

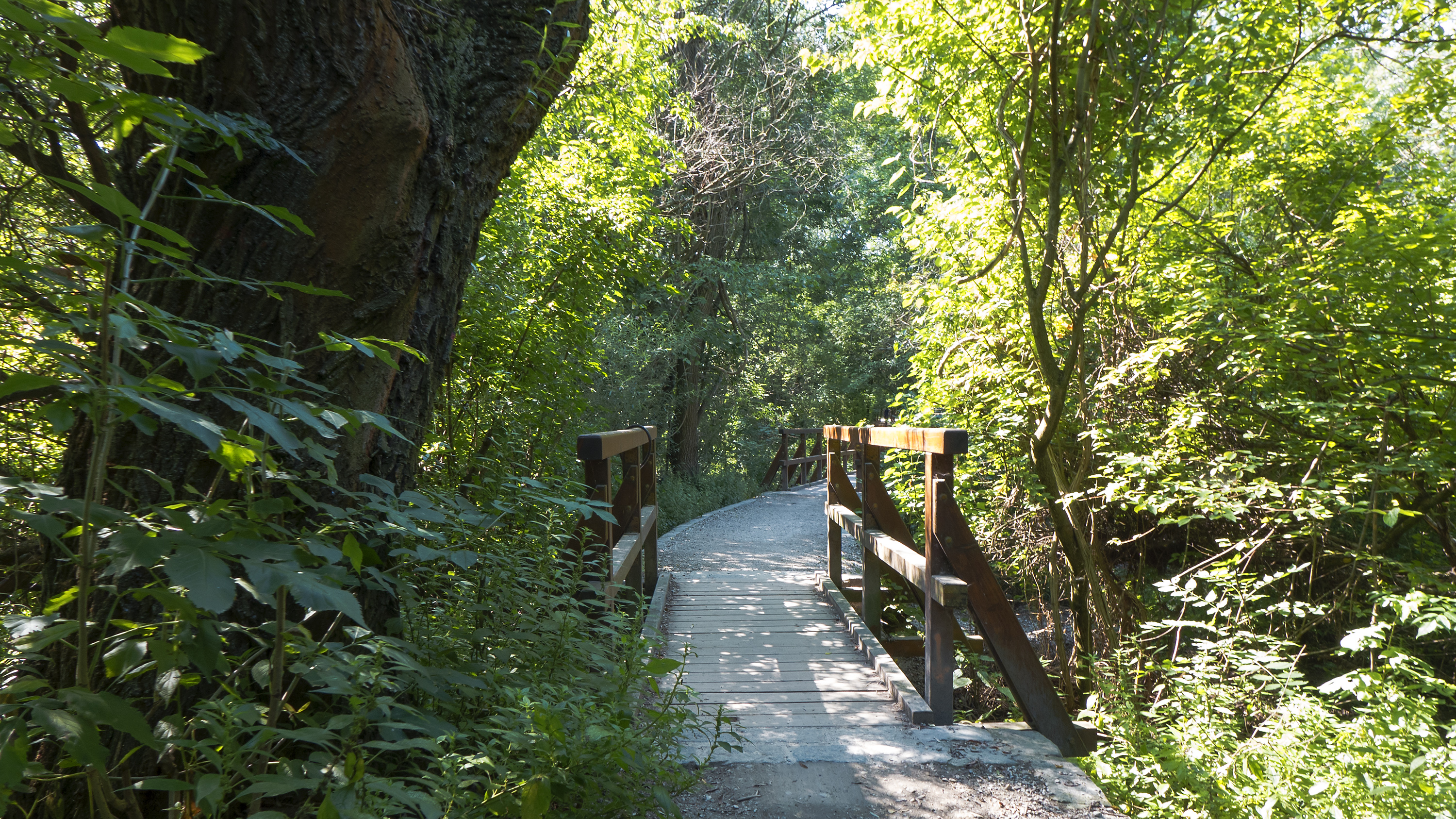
An entrance to the Lobau by Essling

In the west of the city is the Lainzer Tiergarten, a 24.5 km² public nature reserve, of which 19.5 km² is woodland. The park was created in 1561 by Emperor Ferdinand I, who used it as a private hunting ground. After the fall of the monarchy, the Austrian government declared it a public nature reserve. Since 1973, admission has been free of charge. The reserve is home to many wild boar, fallow deer, red deer, and European mouflons, as well as 18 species of bats.

=== Cemeteries ===
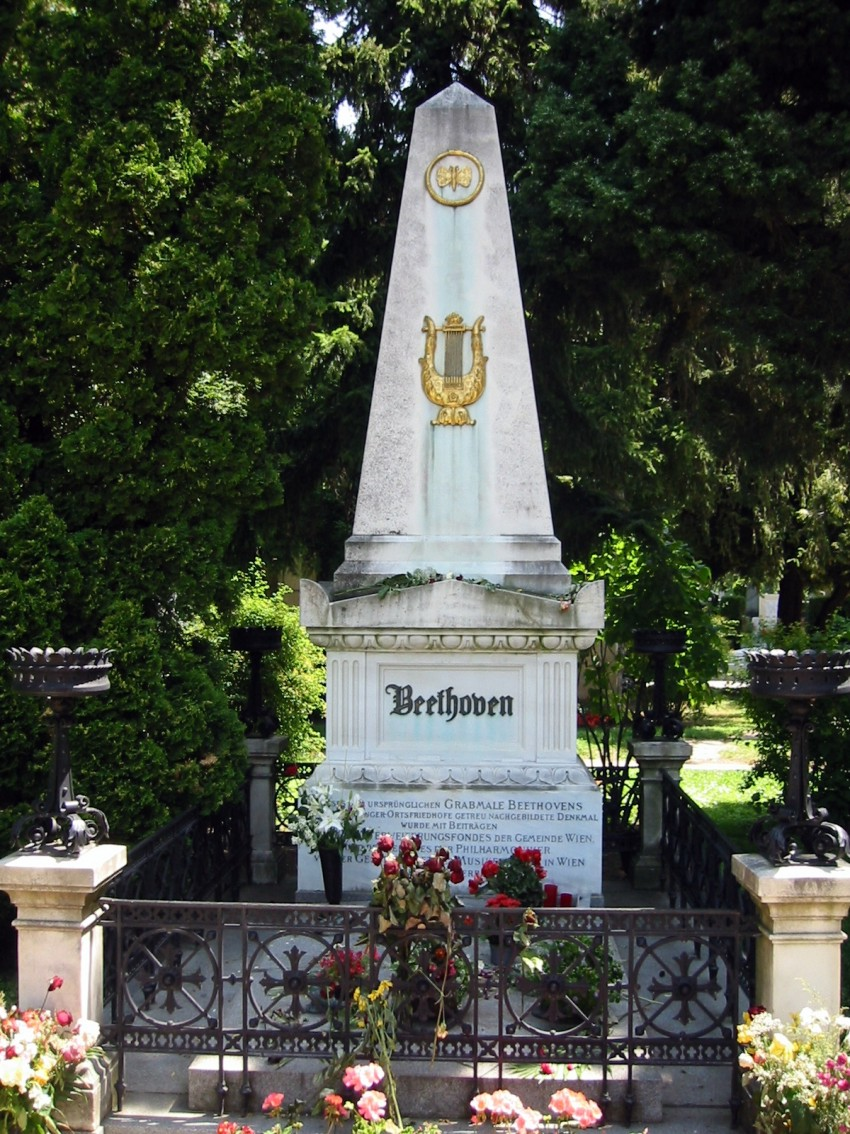
The grave of Ludwig van Beethoven in the Central Cemetery

Vienna has 55 cemeteries, 46 managed by the city and the rest by religious communities.

The largest cemetery in the city is the Vienna Central Cemetery (Zentralfriedhof). Spanning 2.4 km², it holds over 330,000 graves and about 3 million interments. Opened in 1874, the cemetery includes Catholic, Protestant, Muslim, and Jewish sections. Notable figures buried here include Ludwig van Beethoven, Falco, Bruno Kreisky, Hedy Lamarr, and all Austrian presidents who have died since World War II. The cemetery is also a habitat for wildlife, including deer, badgers, and martens. Most notably, European hamsters thrive here, feeding on plants around the headstones. The grounds feature numerous memorials, including those dedicated to the casualties of the Revolutions of 1848, the July Revolt of 1927, and the victims of the Nazi regime.

St. Marx Cemetery, now closed, is the final resting place of Wolfgang Amadeus Mozart. Other notable cemeteries include those in Grinzing and Hietzing, as well as the Jewish Cemetery in Roßau.

=== Rivers ===
==== Danube ====
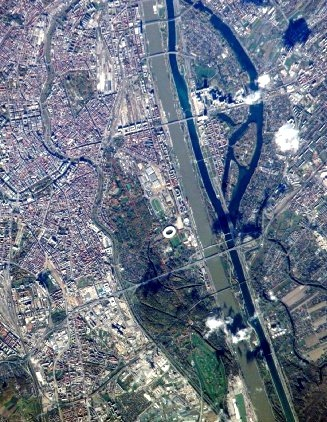
(l-r) Donaukanal, Danube, New Danube, Old Danube

Vienna is the largest city on the Danube, which flows from the north and exits to the southeast.

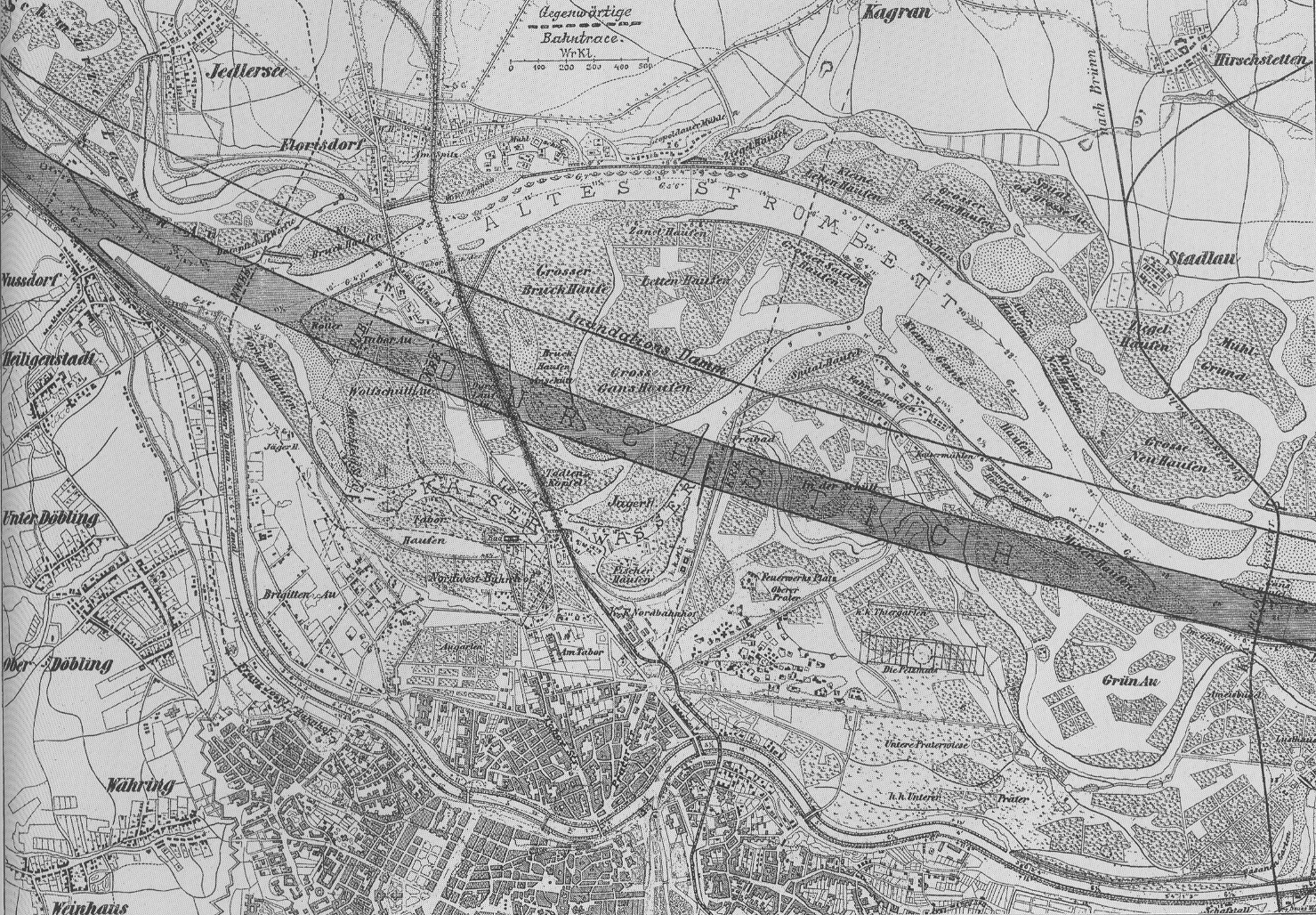
The plan for the regulation

Until 1870, the Danube in Vienna remained unregulated, with the river flowing through multiple branching side arms, making the area highly susceptible to flooding. The first major Danube regulation project involved cutting a new, straight main channel to improve flood control and navigation. As part of the project, the arm that ran closer to the city centre was preserved and is now known as the Donaukanal (Danube Canal). Additionally, another former arm north of the river was transformed into an oxbow lake, today called the Alte Donau (Old Danube).

Despite these measures, Vienna remained vulnerable to flooding. To further mitigate flood risks, a second Danube regulation was undertaken starting in the 1970s. This project involved the construction of a parallel flood relief channel, the Neue Donau (New Danube), designed to divert excess water during high discharge periods. The excavated material from this project was used to create the Donauinsel (Danube Island), a long, narrow artificial island situated between the New Danube and the regulated main river. The effectiveness of these flood protection measures was demonstrated during the 2024 European floods, when Vienna remained largely unaffected.

The four parts of the Danube:

- The main Danube is the widest of the river’s branches and serves as the primary route for shipping.
- The Neue Donau (New Danube) is a side channel located to the east of the main river, running for approximately 21 kilometres. The water flows more slowly than in the main Danube, making it ideal for water sports such as swimming, rowing, and sailing.
- The Alte Donau (Old Danube) is a lake situated to the east of the New Danube, which effectively separates Kaisermühlen from the rest of the city. This lake is a popular recreational area for swimming, with freely accessible piers and beaches. Motorboats and pedalos are permitted on the lake and can be rented from nearby vendors.
- The Donaukanal (Danube Canal) branches off from the main river and re-enters close to the southern and northern edges of the city. Unlike the main river, it flows through the city centre. While primarily used by boats, the paths along both sides of the canal are popular among pedestrians, joggers, and cyclists.
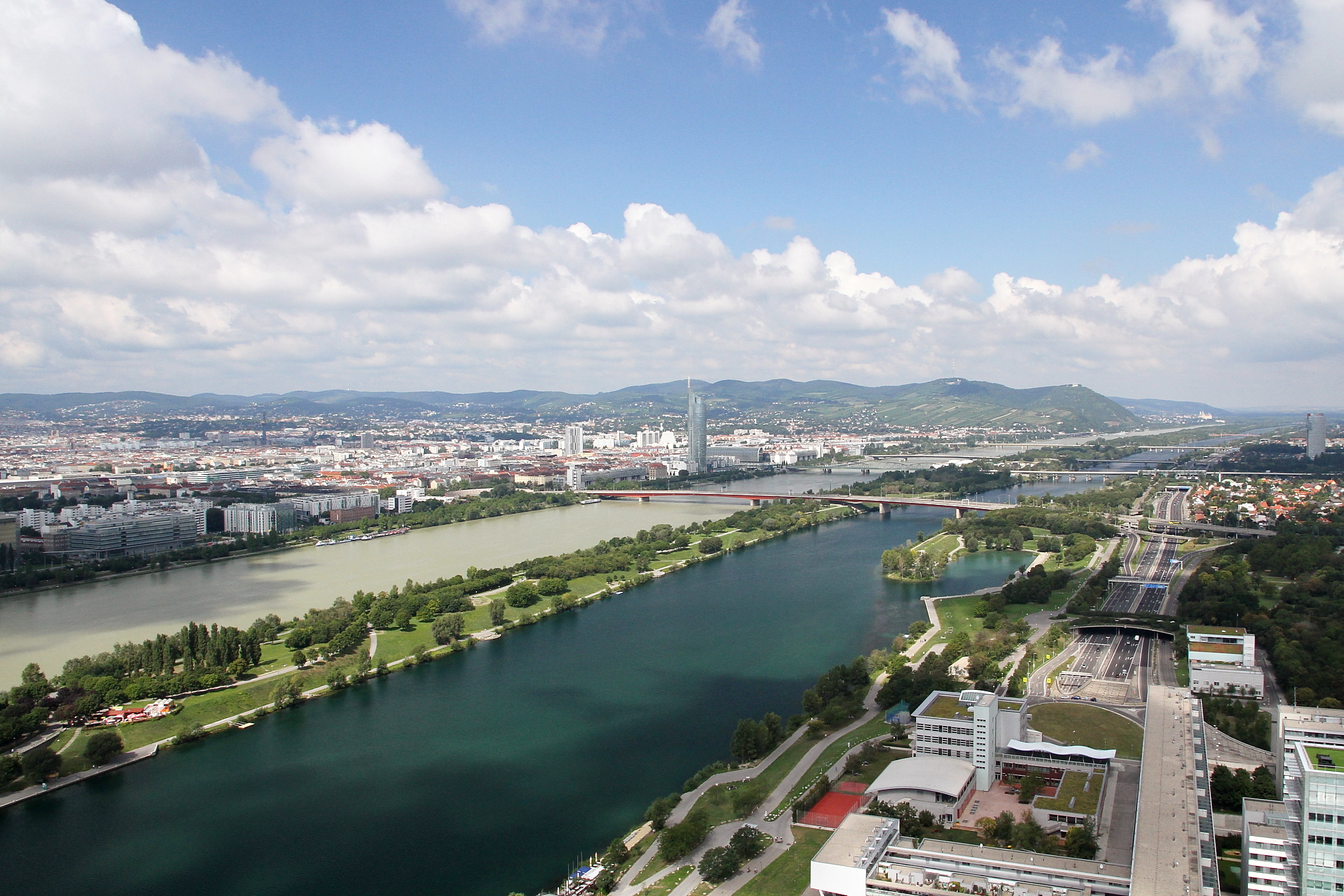
The New Danube in the front, the main Danube in the back, with the Donauinsel in-between

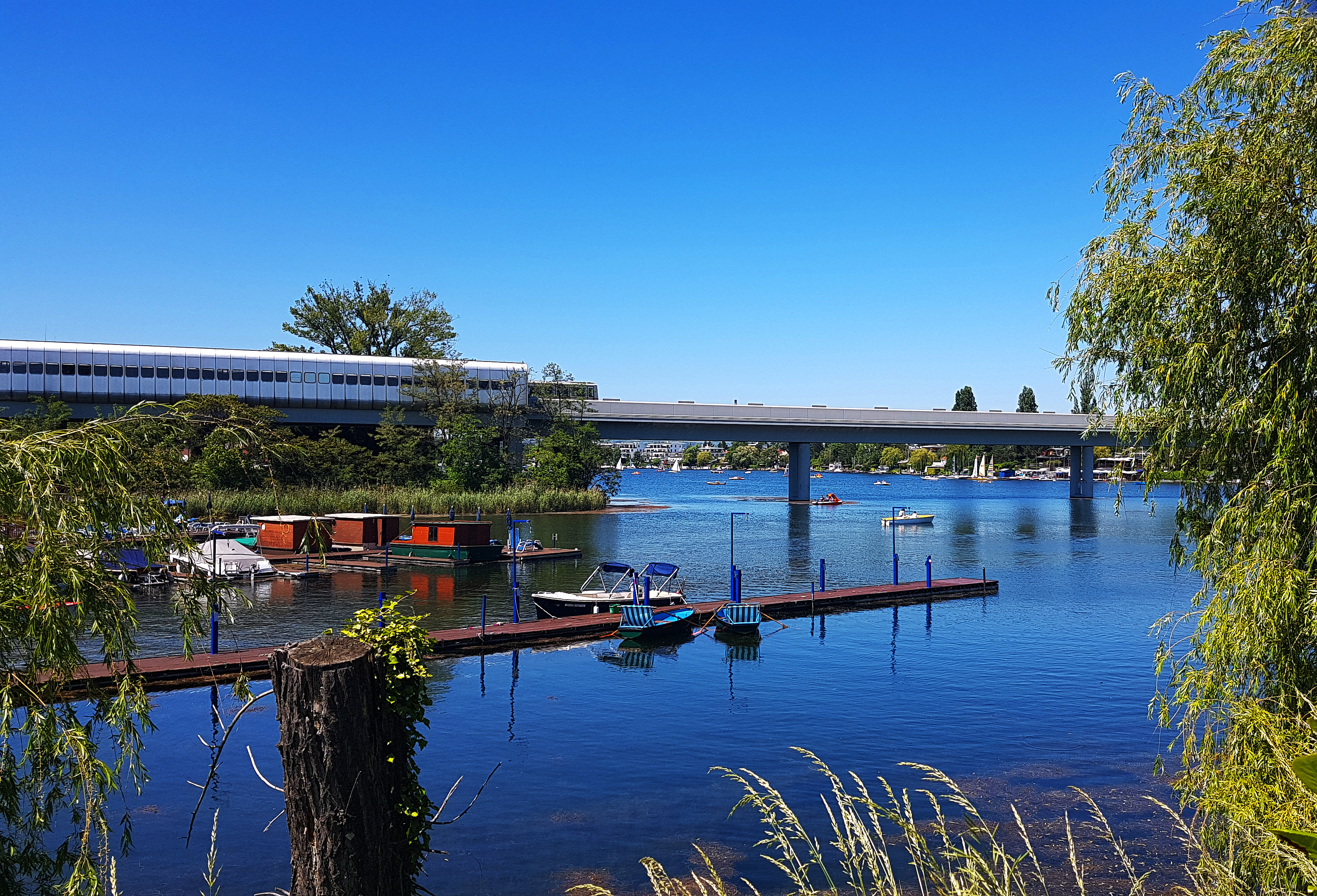
The Old Danube

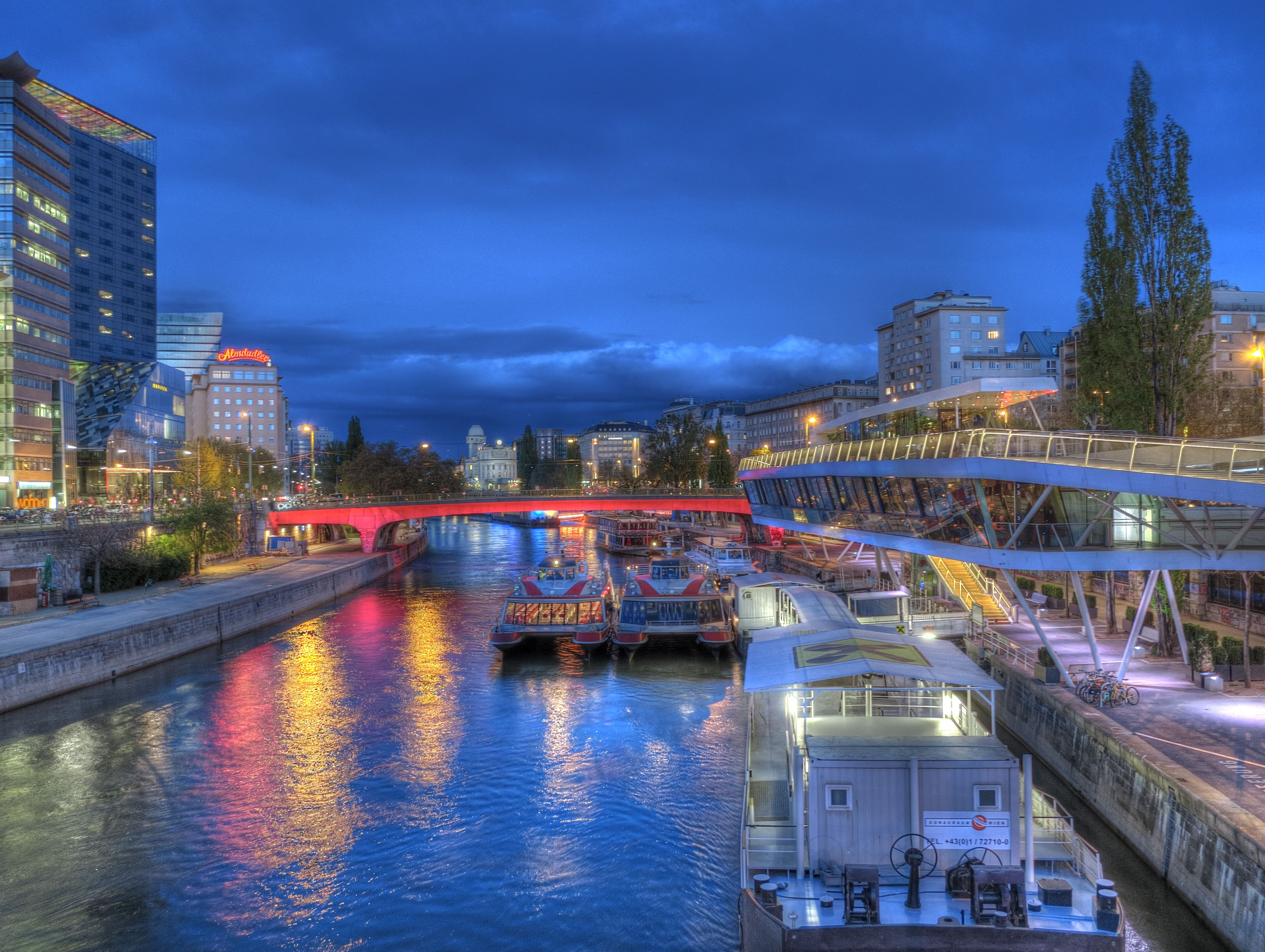
The Donaukanal by Schwedenplatz at night

==== Wien ====
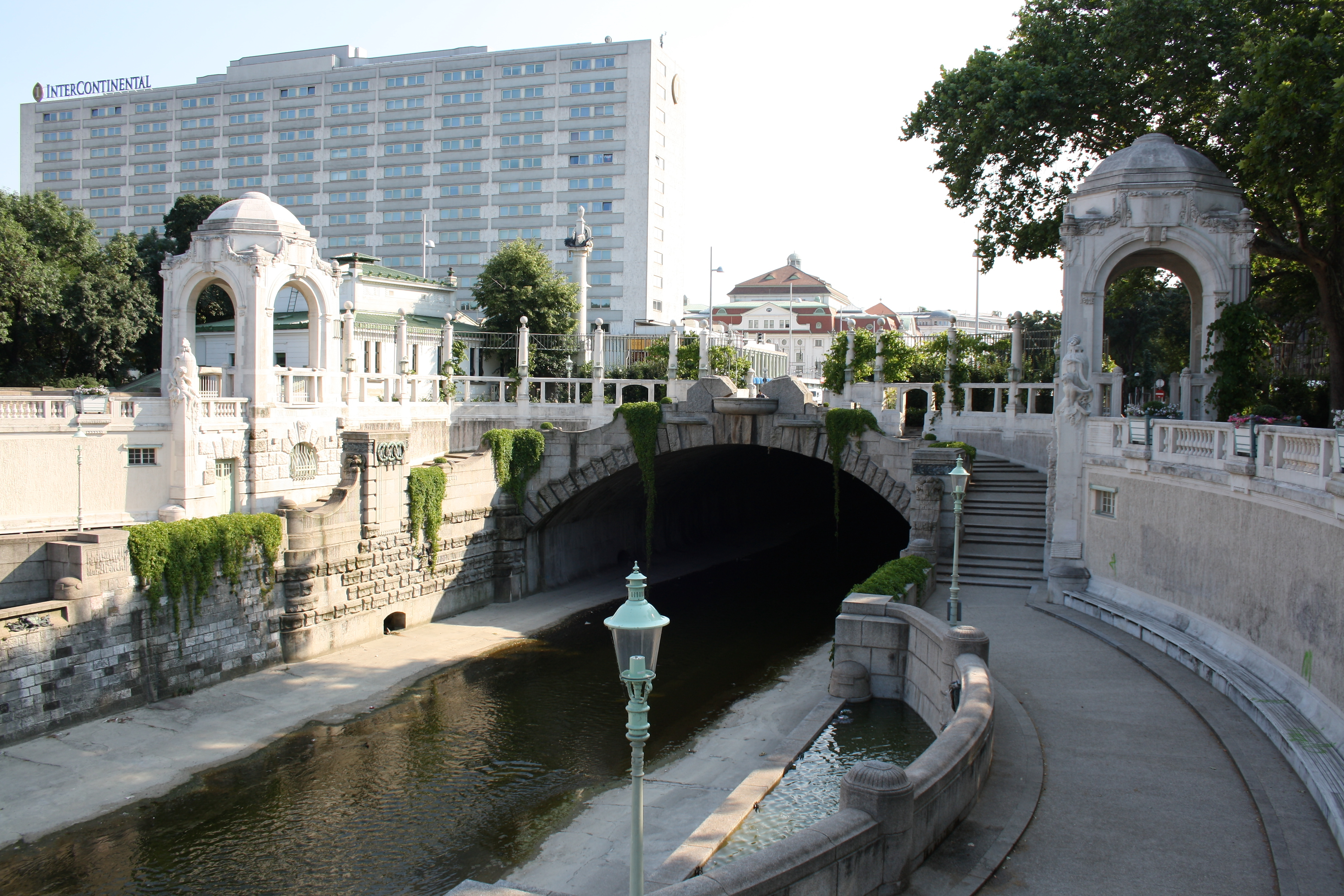
The Wien river in the Stadtpark

The river Wien (die Wien or Wienfluss) is a 34-kilometre-long tributary of the Danube, with approximately half of its course flowing through Vienna. It originates in the Vienna Woods (Wienerwald) and flows eastward through the city, ultimately joining the Donaukanal. Historically, the river was prone to flooding, which prompted several regulatory measures and modifications, including the canalisation of its course in the 19th century. Today, much of the river Wien is contained within underground channels in the urban area. It enters Vienna in Penzing, flowing above ground past Schönbrunn before being covered by the Naschmarkt. The river reemerges in the Stadtpark in the 1st district, before flowing into the Donaukanal.

== Sport ==
=== Football ===
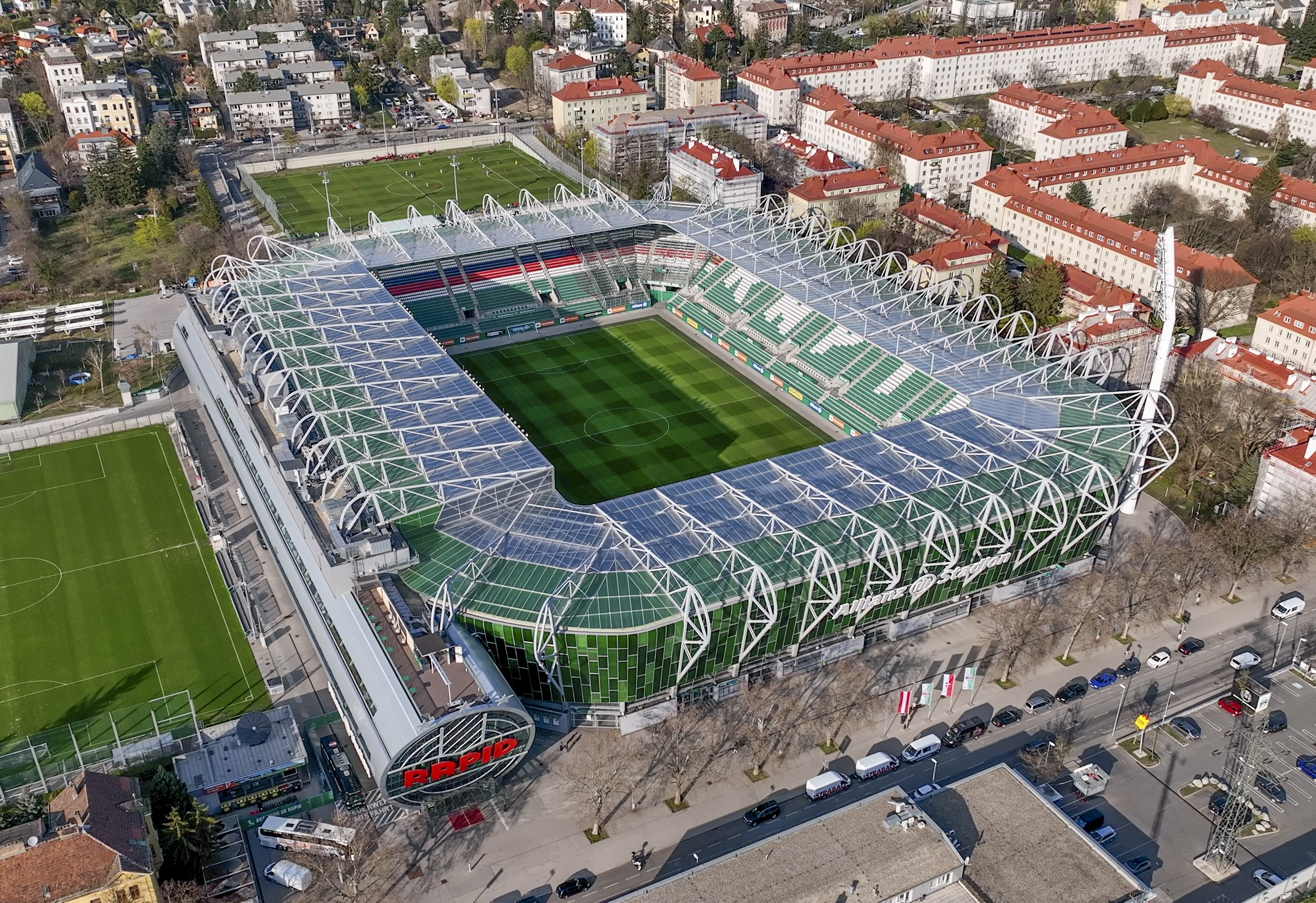
Allianz Stadion, home of Rapid Wien

The city is home to numerous football clubs. The two biggest teams are FK Austria Wien (21 Austrian Bundesliga titles and a record 27-time cup winners), who play at the Generali Arena in Favoriten, and SK Rapid Wien (a record 32 Austrian Bundesliga titles), who play at the Allianz Stadion in Penzing. The oldest team in Austria, First Vienna FC, and Floridsdorfer AC both play in the 2. Liga, while the football team of the Wiener Sport-Club, one of the oldest athletics clubs in the country, plays in the Austrian Regionalliga East, the third division.

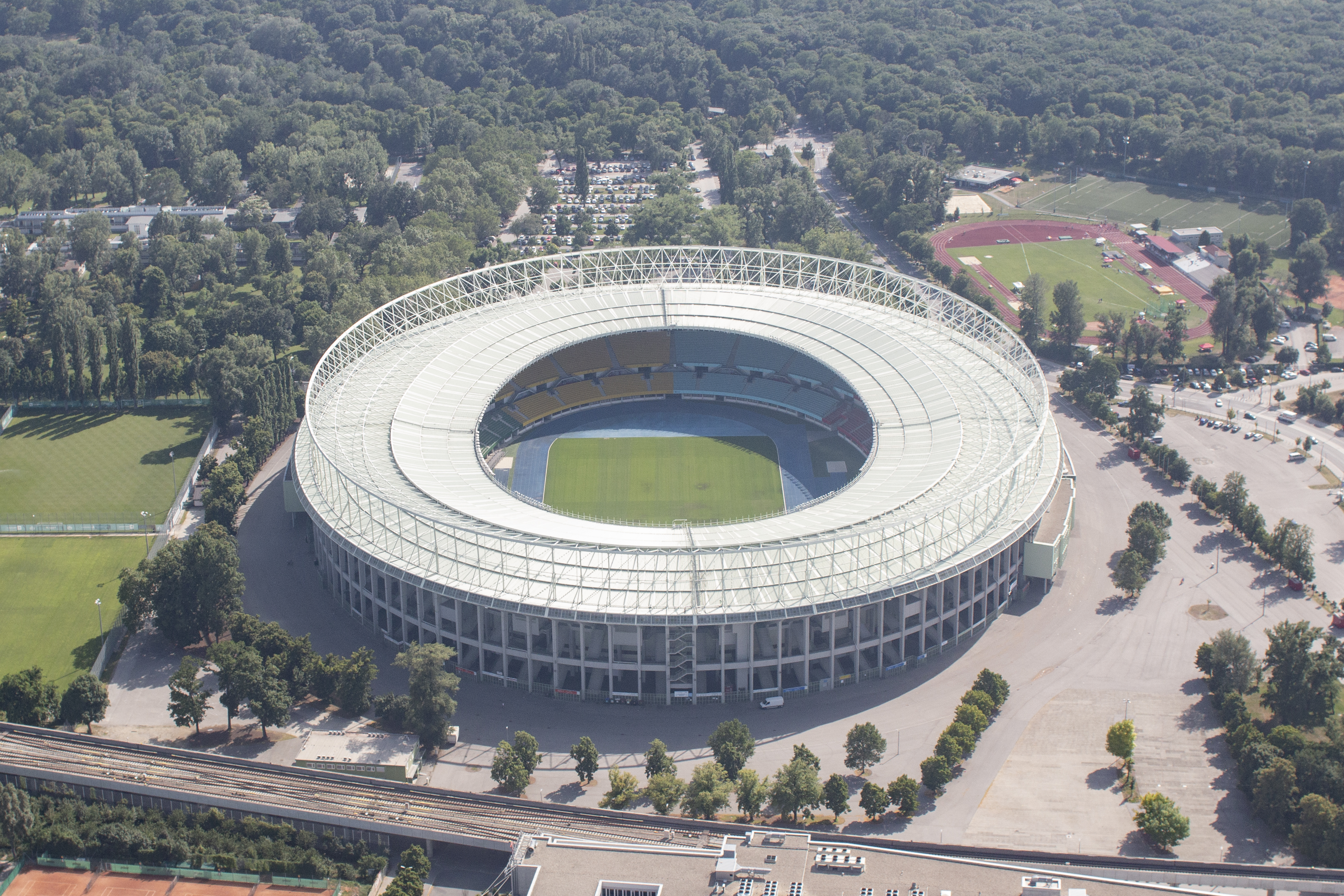
Ernst-Happel-Stadion in the Prater

The Ernst-Happel-Stadion is the largest stadium in Austria with 50,865 seats, and serves as the home stadium of the Austria national football team. It has hosted multiple European Cup finals (1963–64, 1986–87, 1989–90, 1994–95), as well as seven matches during the 2008 European Championship, including the final, which saw Spain secure a 1–0 victory over Germany.

=== Other sports ===
Other sports clubs include the Vikings Vienna (American football), who won the Eurobowl title four times in a row between 2004 and 2007 and had a perfect season in 2013, the Hotvolleys Vienna (volleyball), the Vienna Wanderers (baseball), who won the 2012 and 2013 Championship of the Austrian Baseball League, and the Vienna Capitals (ice hockey). The European Handball Federation (EHF) is headquartered in Vienna. There are also three rugby clubs in the city: Vienna Celtic, the oldest rugby club in Austria, RC Donau, and Stade Viennois.

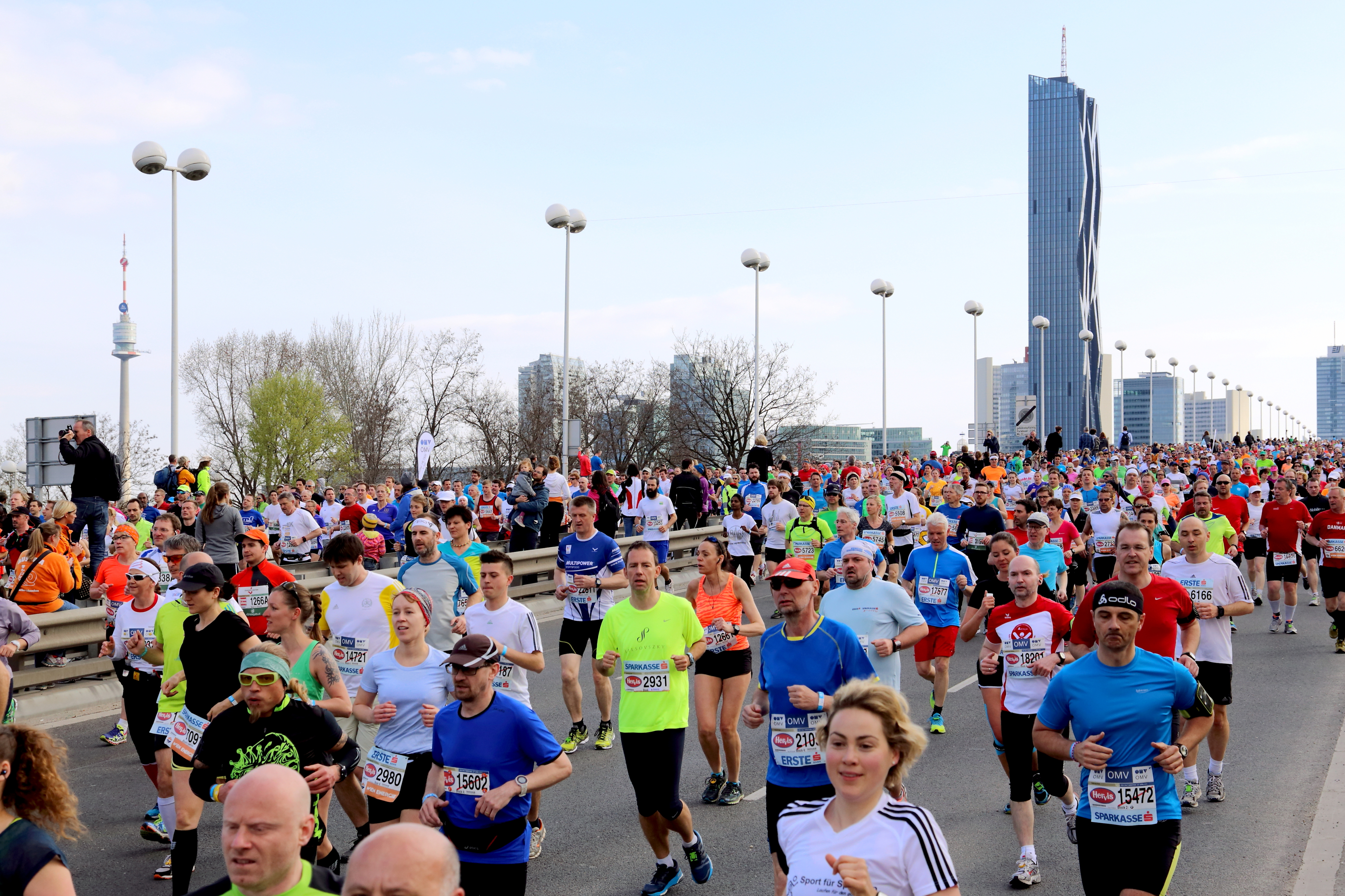
Vienna City Marathon crossing the Reichsbrücke in 2015

In addition to team sports, Vienna offers a wide range of individual sports. The paths in the Prater or along the Donauinsel are popular running routes. The Vienna City Marathon, which attracts more than 10,000 participants annually, typically takes place in May. Cyclists can choose from over 1,000 kilometres of cycle paths and numerous mountain bike trails in the Vienna mountains. Golf courses are available on the Wienerberg and in the Prater. The Vienna Open tennis tournament has taken place in the city since 1974. The matches are played on indoor hard courts in the Wiener Stadthalle. The City of Vienna also operates two ski slopes, one on the Hohe-Wand-Wiese and another on the Dollwiese.

The city submitted a bid to host the 1964 Summer Olympics but lost out to Tokyo.

== Cuisine ==
=== Food ===
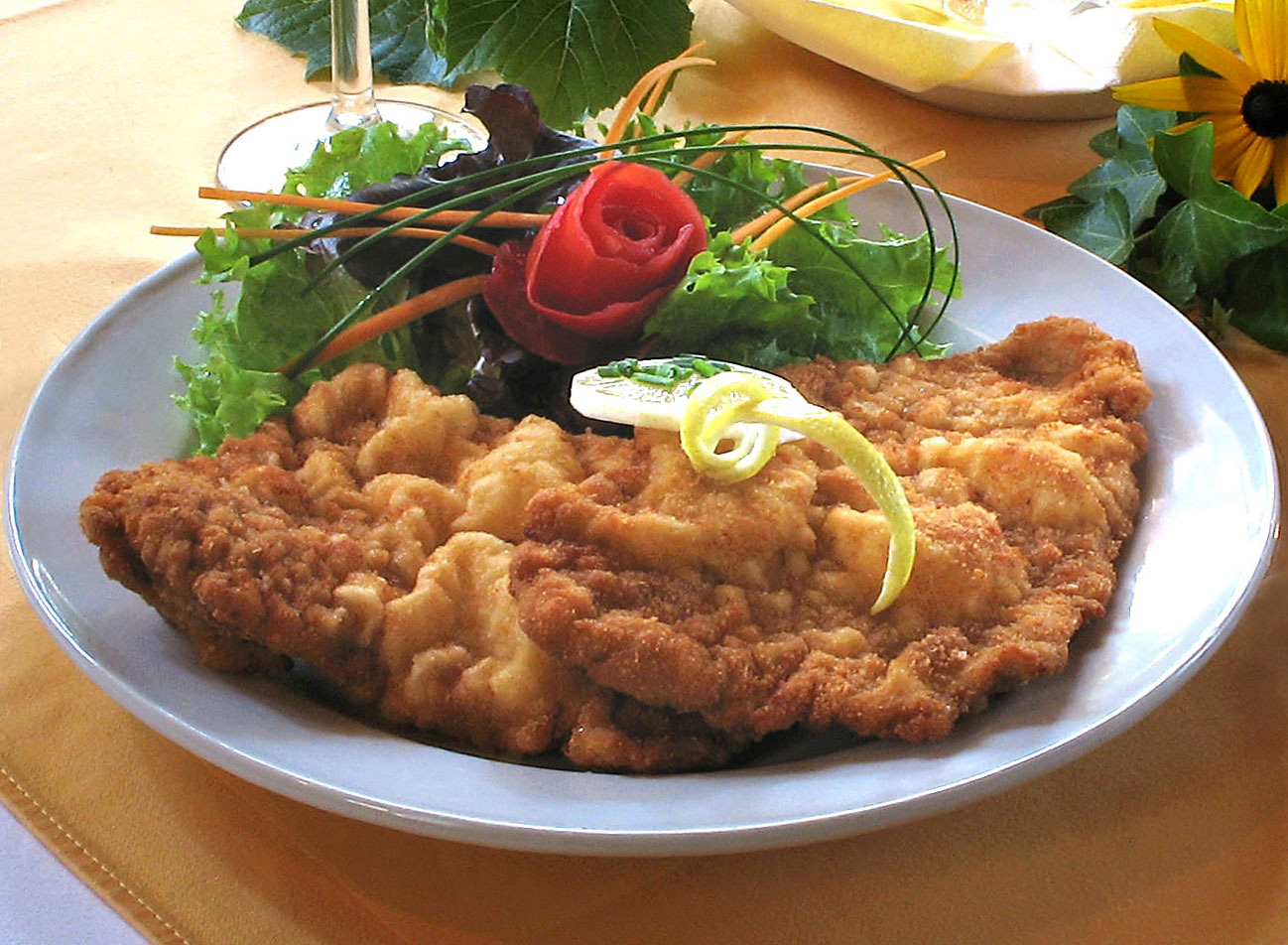
Wiener schnitzel

Vienna is well known for Wiener schnitzel, a cutlet of veal (Kalbsschnitzel), sometimes also made with pork (Schweinsschnitzel) or chicken (Hühnerschnitzel), that is pounded flat, coated in flour, egg, and breadcrumbs, and fried in clarified butter. It is available in almost every restaurant that serves Viennese cuisine and can be eaten hot or cold. Other examples of Viennese cuisine include Tafelspitz (very lean boiled beef), which is traditionally served with Geröstete Erdäpfel (boiled potatoes that are sliced and pan-fried) and horseradish sauce, Apfelkren (a mixture of horseradish, cream and apple) and Schnittlauchsauce (a chives sauce made with mayonnaise and stale bread).

Vienna has a long tradition of producing cakes and desserts. These include Apfelstrudel (hot apple strudel), Milchrahmstrudel (milk-cream strudel), Palatschinken (sweet pancakes), and Knödel (dumplings) often filled with fruit such as apricots (Marillenknödel). Sachertorte, a delicately moist chocolate cake with a layer of apricot jam and a chocolate glaze, created by the Sacher Hotel, is world-famous.

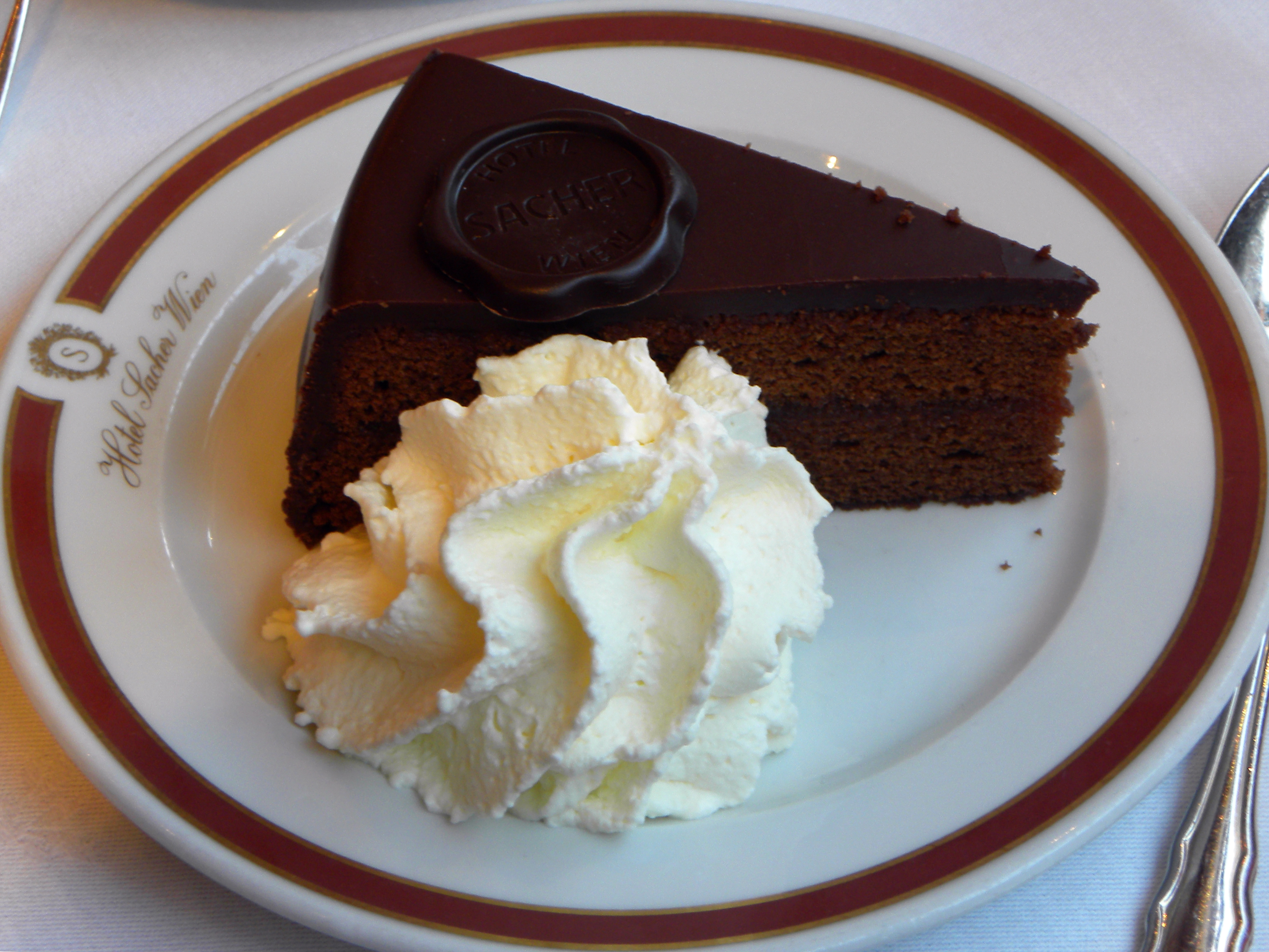
A Sachertorte at the Hotel Sacher

In winter, small street stands sell traditional Maroni (hot chestnuts) and potato fritters.

Sausages are popular and available from street vendors (Würstelstand) throughout the day and into the night. The sausage known as Wiener (German for Viennese) in the U.S. and in Germany is called a Frankfurter in Vienna. Other popular sausages are Burenwurst (a coarse beef and pork sausage, generally boiled), Käsekrainer (spicy pork with small chunks of cheese), and Bratwurst (a white pork sausage). These sausages either come with sliced bread or as a hot dog. Mustard is the traditional condiment and usually offered in two varieties: "süß" (sweet) or "scharf" (spicy).

Vienna ranked 10th in vegan-friendly European cities in a study by Alternative Traveler in 2020.

The Naschmarkt is a permanent market for fruit, vegetables, spices, fish, and meat, as well as a popular spot for international cuisine, with numerous small restaurants and food stalls offering dishes from around the world.

=== Drinks ===
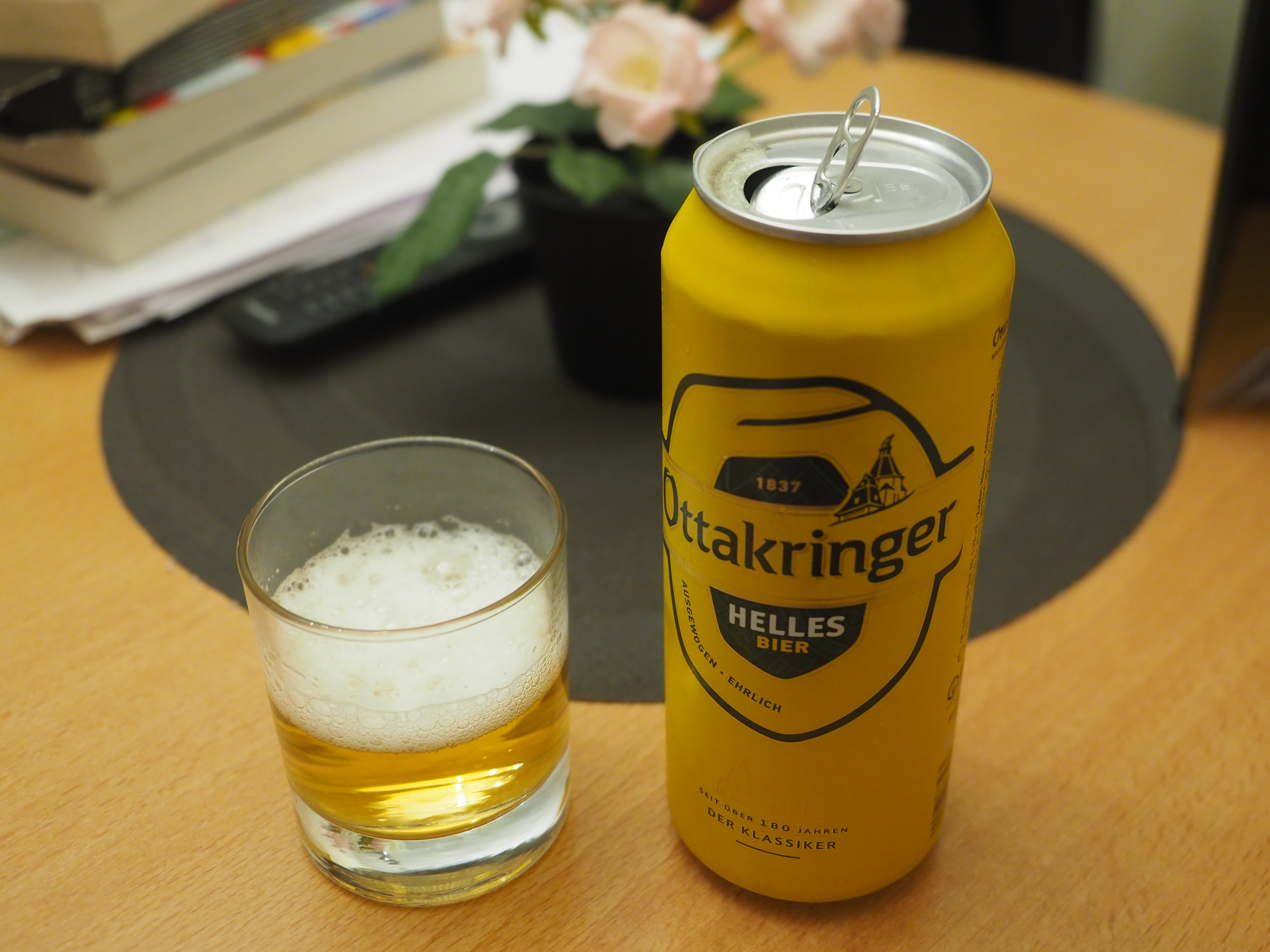
Ottakringer Helles

Vienna is one of the few remaining world capitals with its own vineyards. The wine is served in small Viennese pubs known as Heuriger. The wine is often enjoyed as a Spritzer ("G'spritzter") with sparkling water. The Grüner Veltliner, a dry white wine, is the most widely cultivated wine in Austria. Another wine typical of the region is "Gemischter Satz", which is usually a blend of different grape varieties harvested from the same vineyard.

Beer is second in importance to wine. Vienna has a single large brewery, Ottakringer, and more than ten microbreweries. Ottakringer's most popular product is the Ottakringer Helles, a beer with an alcohol content of 5.2%. Vienna is home to many Beisln, small traditional Austrian pubs.

Local soft drinks, such as Almdudler, are popular across the country as an alternative to alcoholic beverages, ranking them among the top choices alongside American brands like Coca-Cola in terms of market share. Other popular drinks include Spezi, a mix between cola and orange lemonade, and Frucade, a German carbonated orange drink.

=== Viennese cafés ===
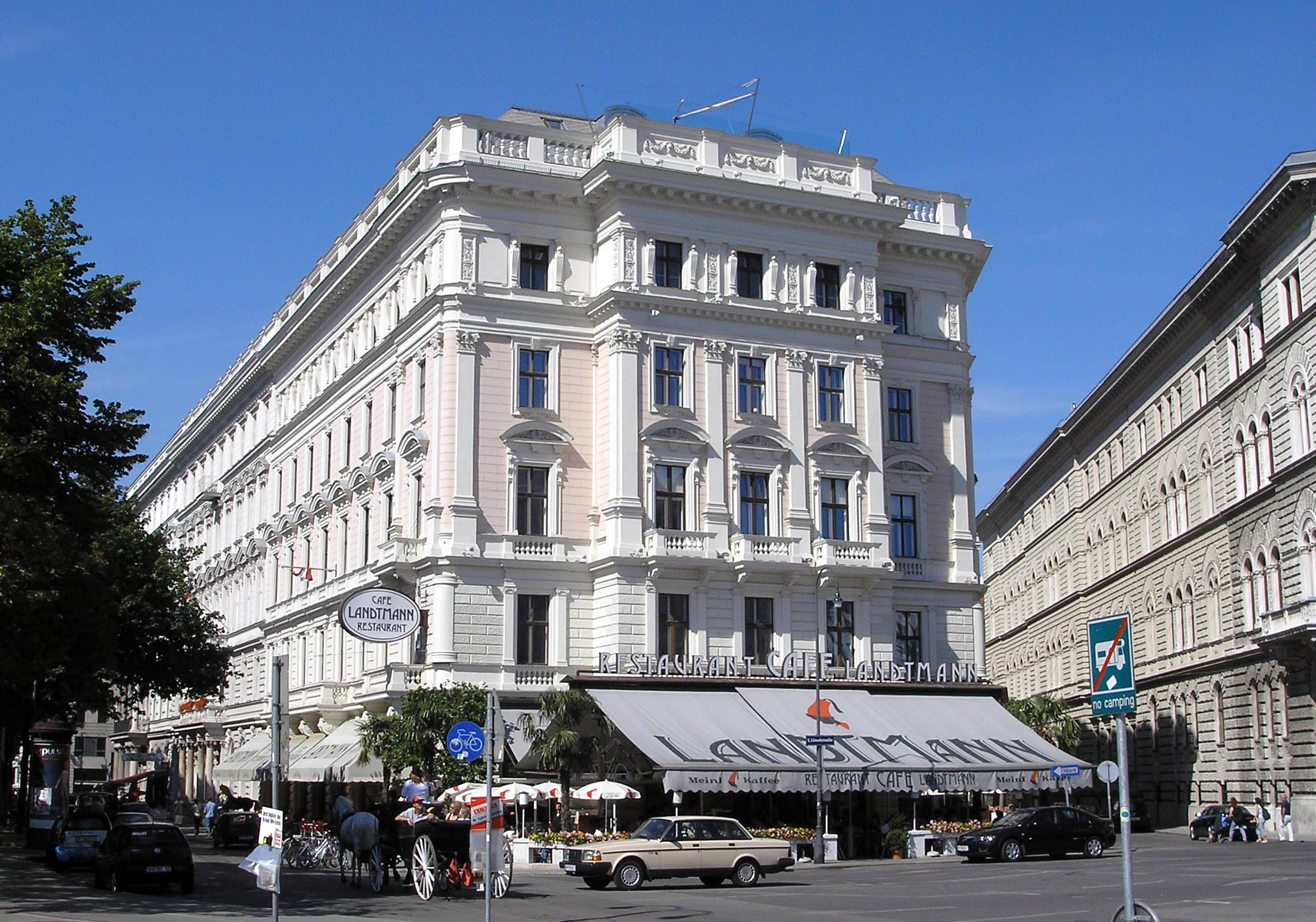
Cafe Landtmann

The Viennese coffee house (Kaffeehaus) dates back to the Austro-Hungarian Empire. The Vienna intelligentsia treated Viennese cafés like a living room. The first Viennese café was opened in 1685 by Armenian businessman Johannes Diodato. Café culture flourished in Vienna in the early 19th century. Notable patrons included political figures such as Joseph Stalin, Adolf Hitler, Leon Trotsky, and Josip Broz Tito, who all lived in Vienna in 1913, as well as scientists, writers, and artists such as Sigmund Freud, Stefan Zweig, Egon Schiele and Gustav Klimt.

Notable coffee houses include:

- Café Central: frequented by Hitler, Stalin, Tito, Trotsky, and Zweig
- Café Landtmann: frequented by Freud
- Café Sacher: part of the Hotel Sacher

=== Heuriger ===
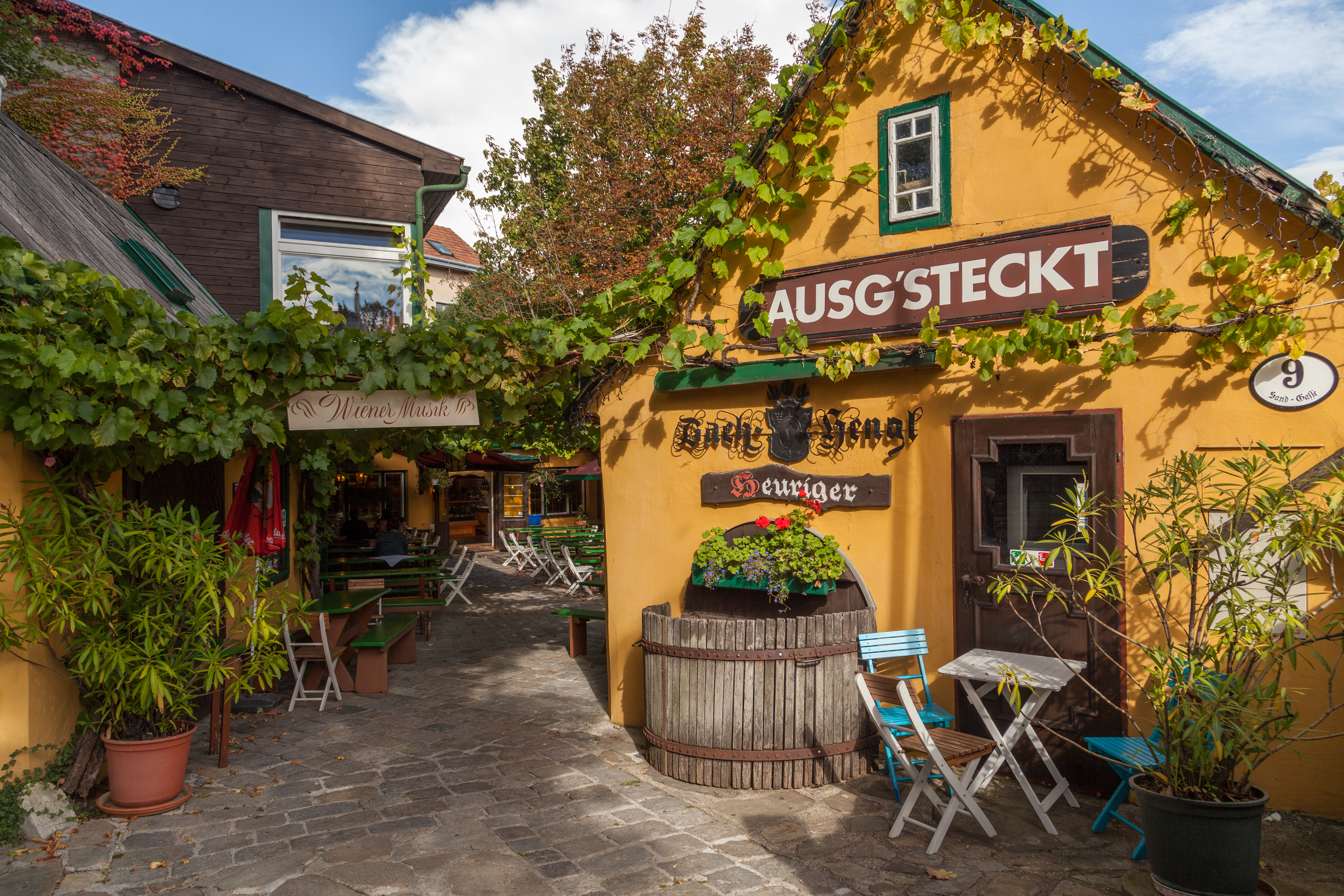
Typical Heuriger in Grinzing

Vienna is one of the few major cities with its own wine-growing region. This wine is sold in taverns, so-called Heuriger, by the local winemakers during the growing season. The wine is often served as a Schorle, a mix of wine and carbonated water. The meals are simple and homemade, usually consisting of fresh bread, typically semmels, with local cold cuts and cheese, or Liptauer spread. The Heurigers are especially numerous in the areas of Döbling (Grinzing, Neustift am Walde, Nußdorf, Salmannsdorf, Sievering), Floridsdorf (Stammersdorf, Strebersdorf), Liesing (Mauer), and Favoriten (Oberlaa).

== Transport ==
=== Public transport ===
Vienna has an extensive public transportation network. It consists predominantly of the Wiener Linien network (subway, tram, and bus lines) and the S-Bahn lines belonging to the Austrian Federal Railways (ÖBB). As of 2023, 32% of the population of the city uses public transit as their main mode of transit.

Vienna U-Bahn network

==== U-Bahn ====
The Vienna metro system consists of five lines (U1, U2, U3, U4, U6) with the U5 currently under construction. The metro currently serves 99 stations and covers a distance of 83.5 kilometres. The services run from 05:00 to about 01:00 with intervals of two to five minutes during the day and up to eight minutes after 20:00. On Friday and Saturday evenings and on evenings before a public holiday they operate a 24-hour service at 15-minute intervals.

Line	Colour	Route	Length	Stations
U1 (Vienna U-Bahn)	Red	Oberlaa – Leopoldau	19.2 km (11.9 mi)	24
U2 (Vienna U-Bahn)	Purple	Karlsplatz – Seestadt	17.2 km (10.7 mi)	21
U3 (Vienna U-Bahn)	Orange	Ottakring – Simmering	13.4 km (8.3 mi)	21
U4 (Vienna U-Bahn)	Green	Hütteldorf – Heiligenstadt	16.4 km (10.2 mi)	20
U6 (Vienna U-Bahn)	Brown	Siebenhirten – Floridsdorf	17.3 km (10.7 mi)	24

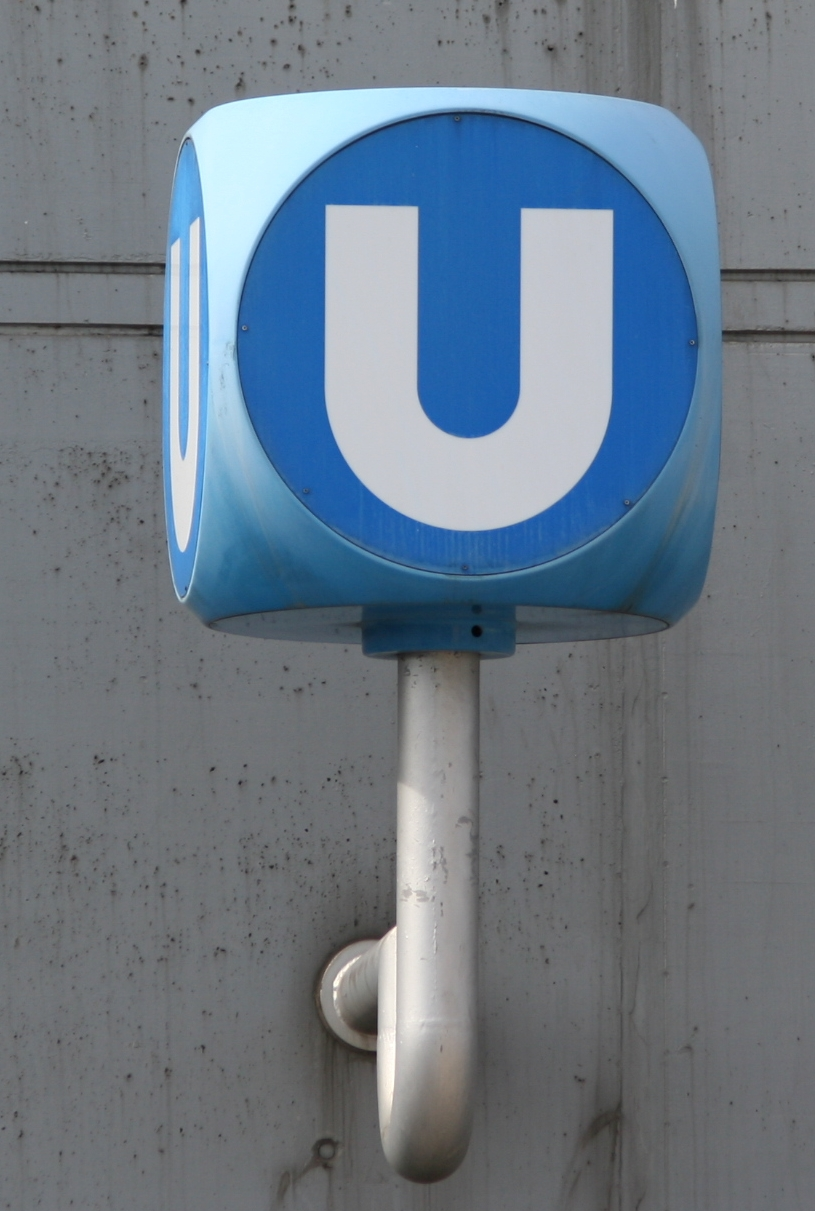
Logo

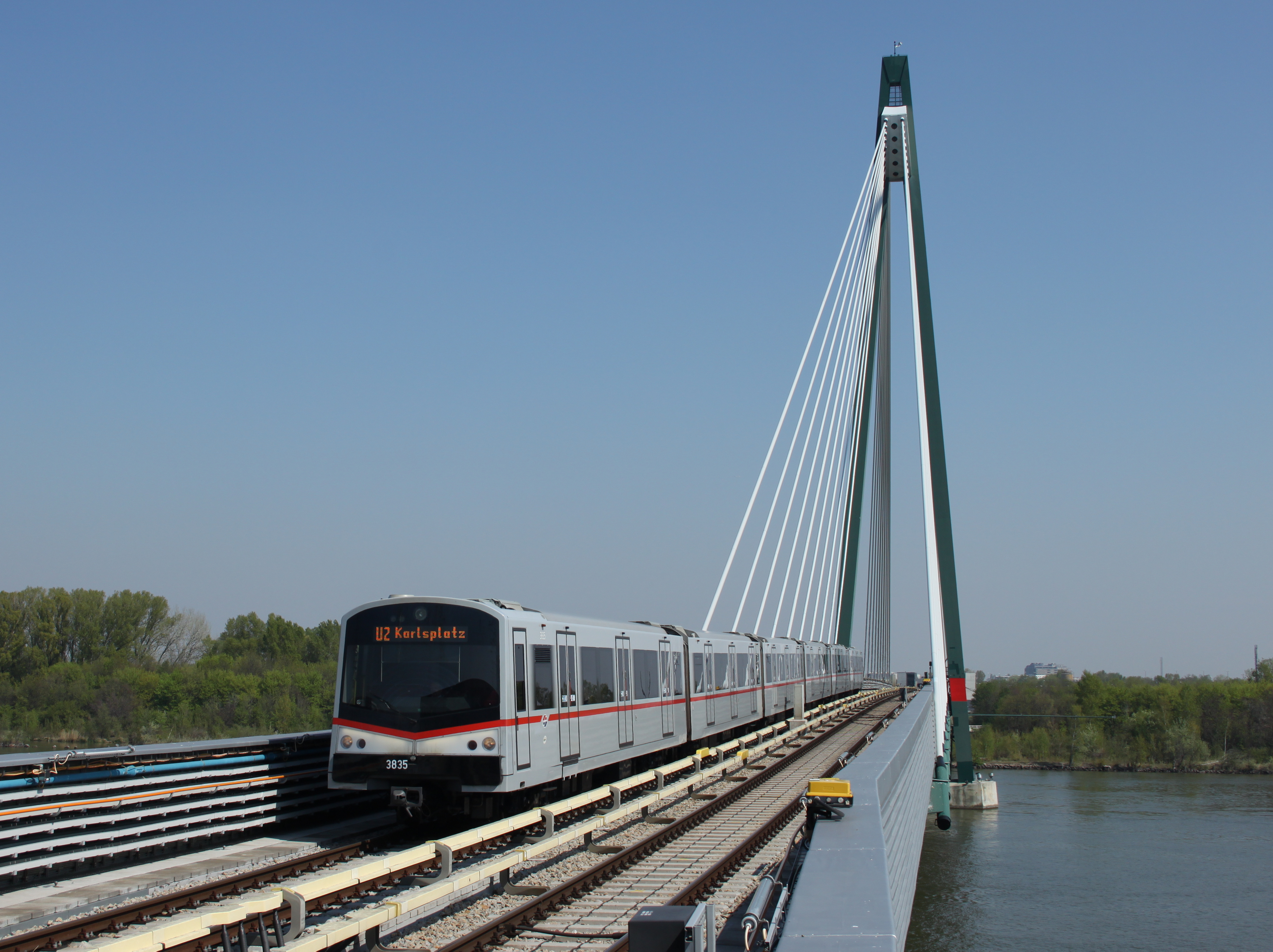
The U2 crossing the Danube

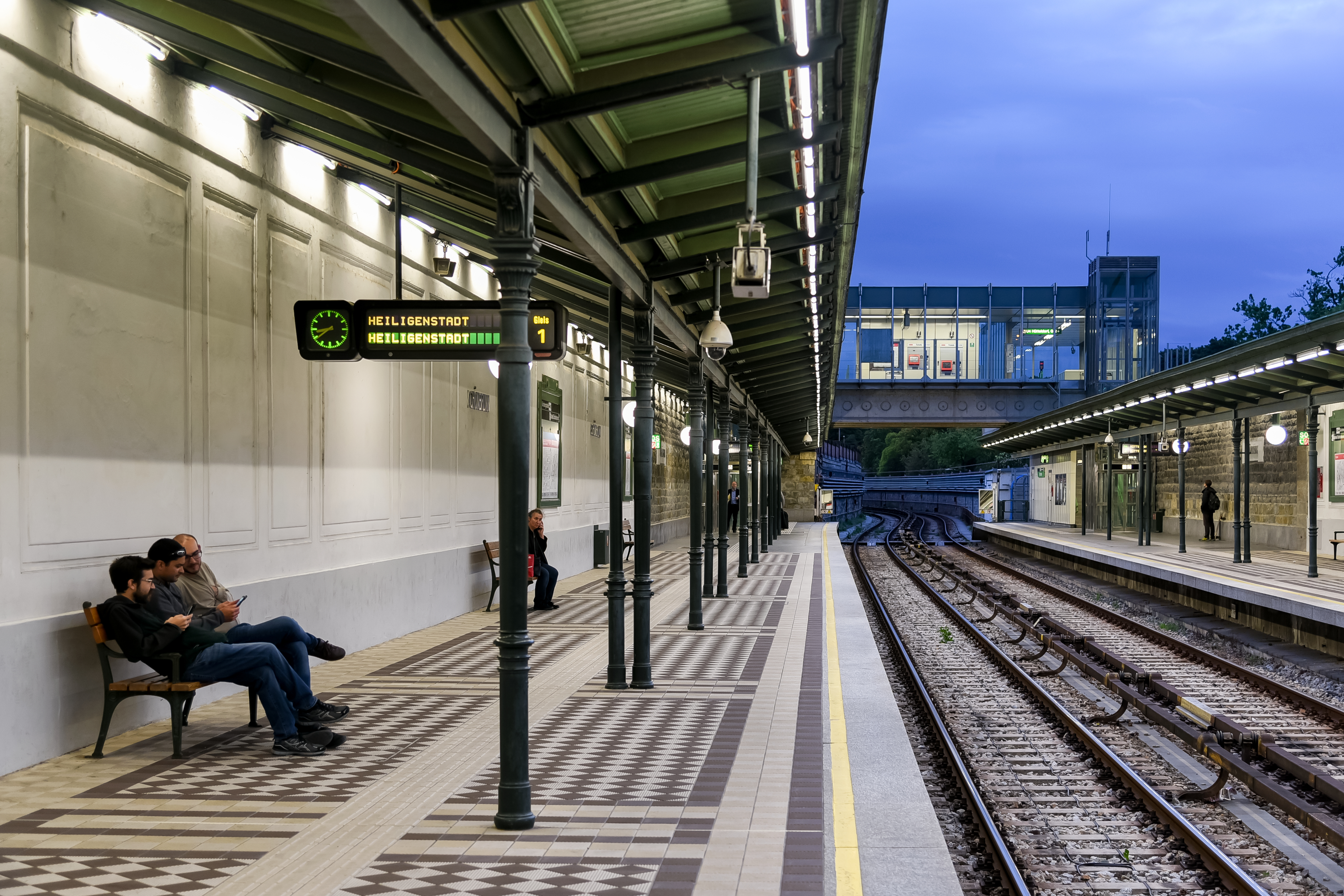
Schönbrunn station

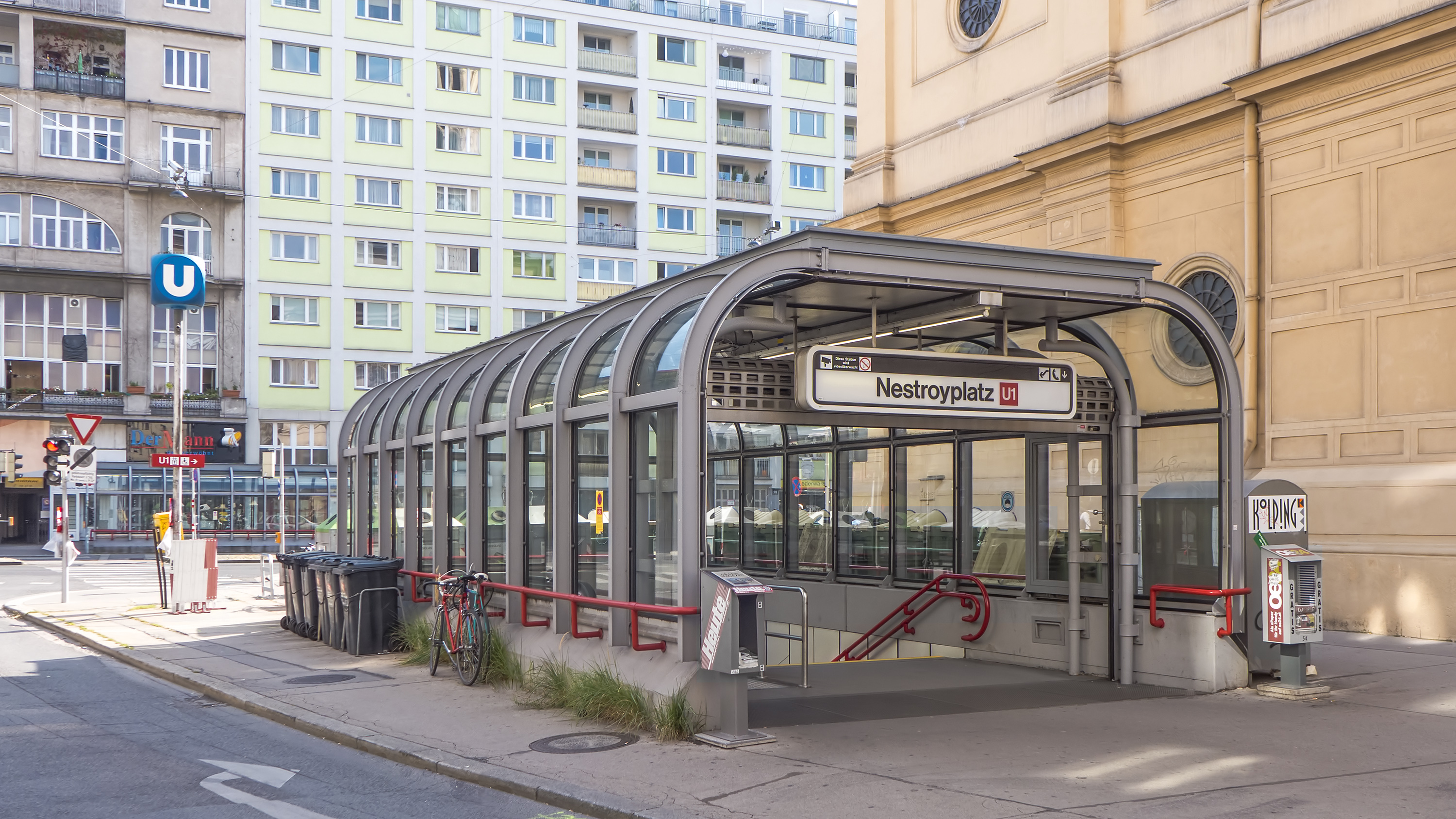
Entrance to Nestroyplatz

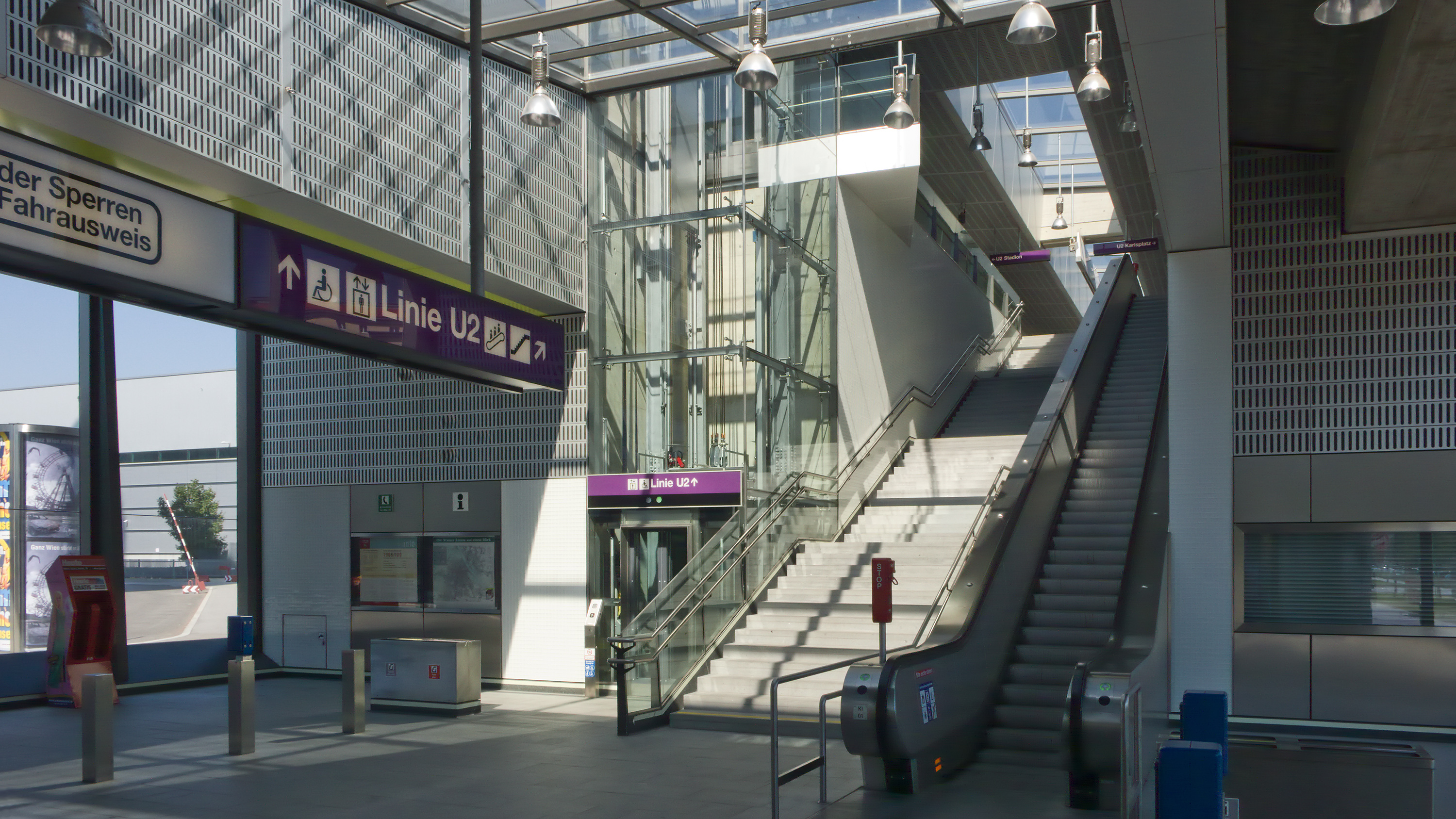
Interior of Krieau station

==== Buses ====
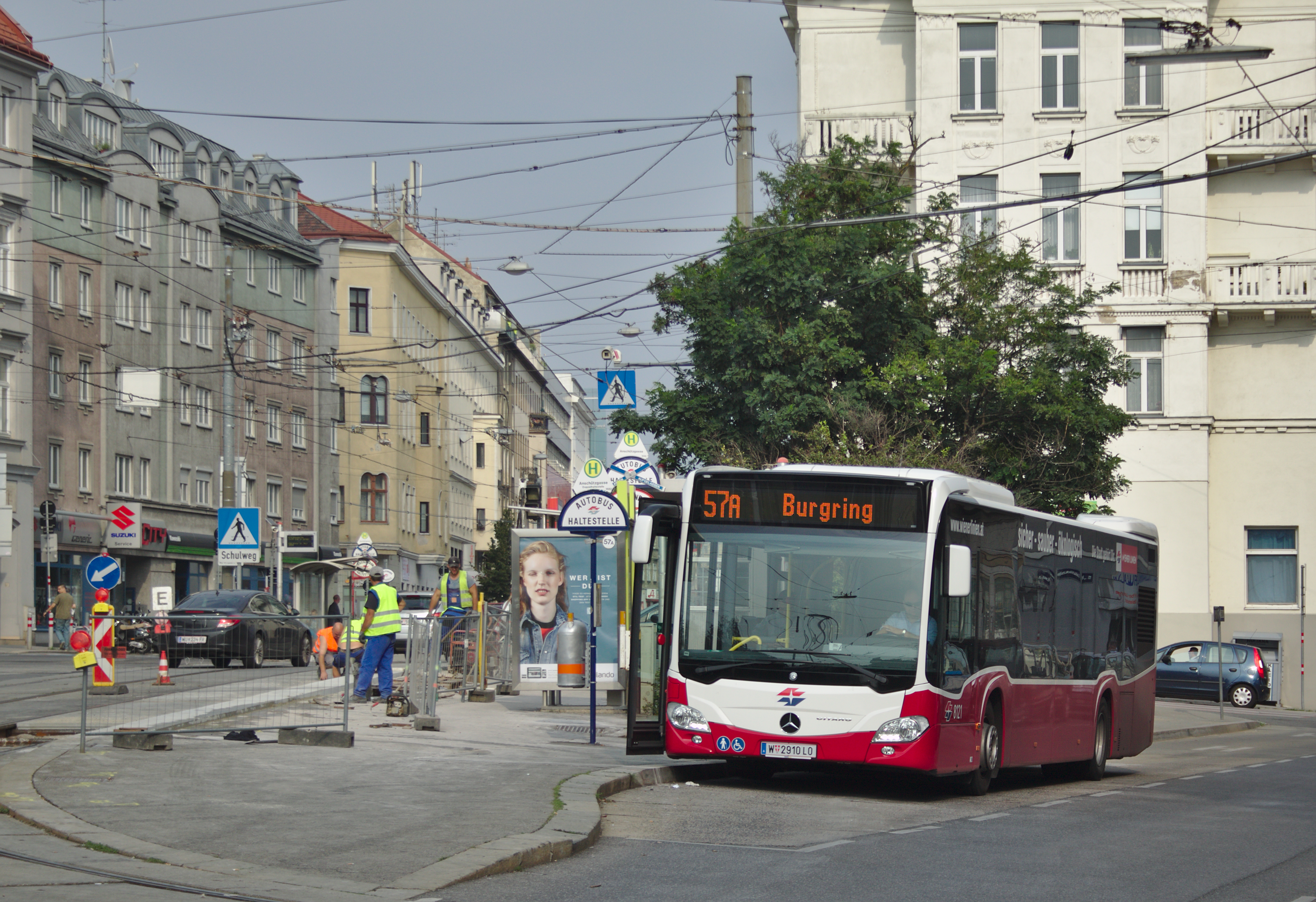
The 57a bus at the Anschützgasse stop

Buses were first introduced to the city in 1907. Currently, 117 bus lines operate in Vienna during the day. 47 of these are run by the Wiener Linien, who also set the routes and timetables, the rest by subcontractors such as Dr Richard, Gschwindl and Blaguss. The Wiener Linien also operates 20 night buses.

==== Trams ====
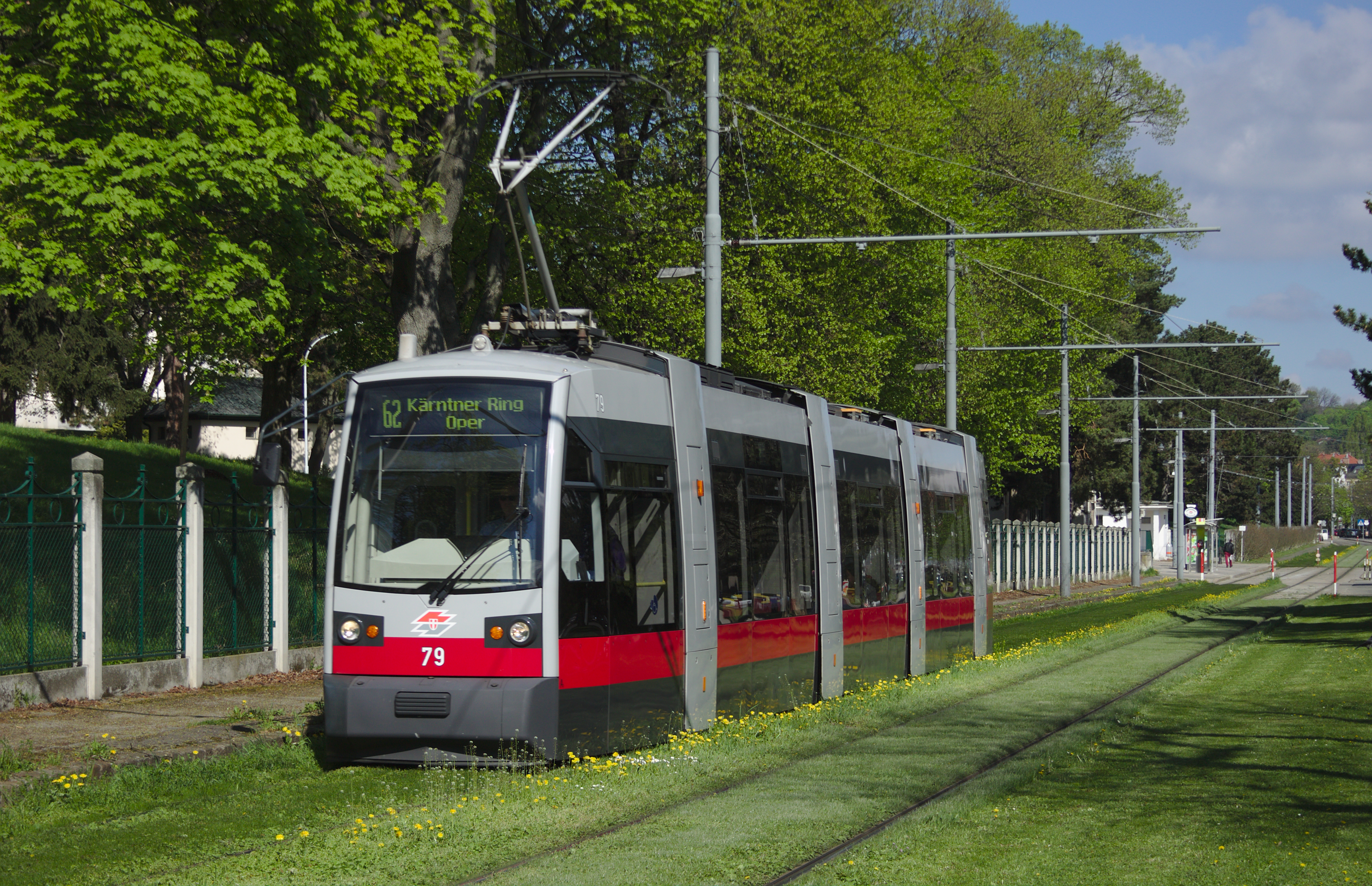
The 62 tram, an A_{1} model, in Hietzing

The Viennese tram network has existed since 1865; the first line was electrified in 1897. There are currently 29 lines with 1161 stops that operate on a network of 176,9 km. The trams move at about 15 km/h. The fleet consists of both high-floor and low-floor vehicles; however, the high-floor models, which are not air-conditioned, are in the process of being replaced by more modern, accessible trams. The modern models are air-conditioned and suitable for disabled users.

==== Trains ====
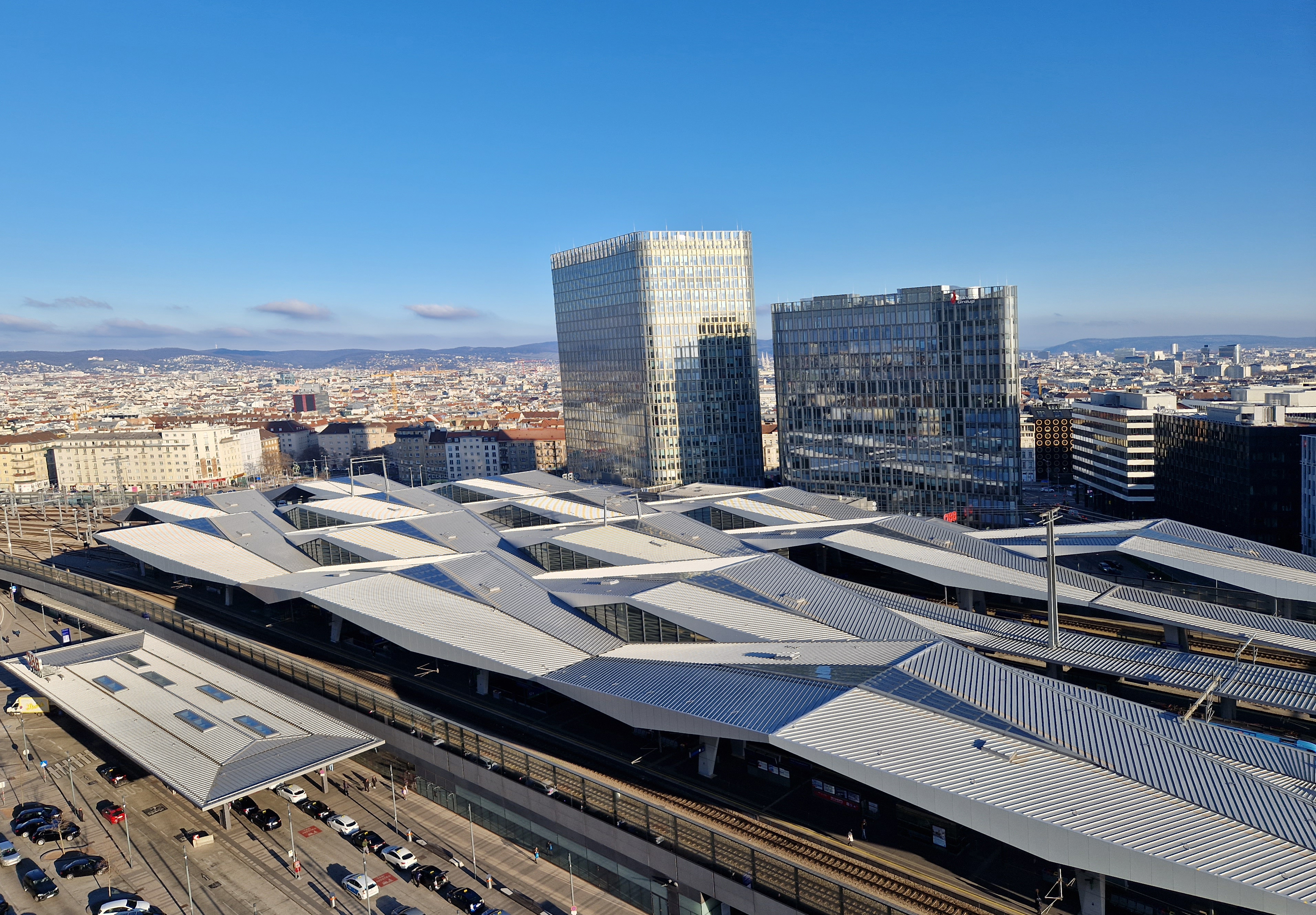
The Hauptbahnhof

The city forms the hub of the Austrian railway system, with services to all parts of the country and abroad. The railway system connects Vienna's main station Vienna Hauptbahnhof with other European cities, including Bratislava, Budapest, Ljubljana, Munich, Prague, Venice, Wrocław, Warsaw, Zagreb, and Zürich. Other train stations include:

- Wien Franz-Josefs-Bahnhof, the starting point of the Franz-Josefs-Bahn
- Wien Hütteldorf on the Western railway
- Wien Meidling on the Southern railway. This is Vienna's most frequented transit station.
- Wien Mitte (Landstraße) on the S-Bahn line; it is the closest railway station to the centre of the city.
- Wien Praterstern (Formerly known as Wien Nord or Wien Nord-Praterstern) on the Northern railway
- Wien Westbahnhof, starting point of the Western railway

=== Cycling ===
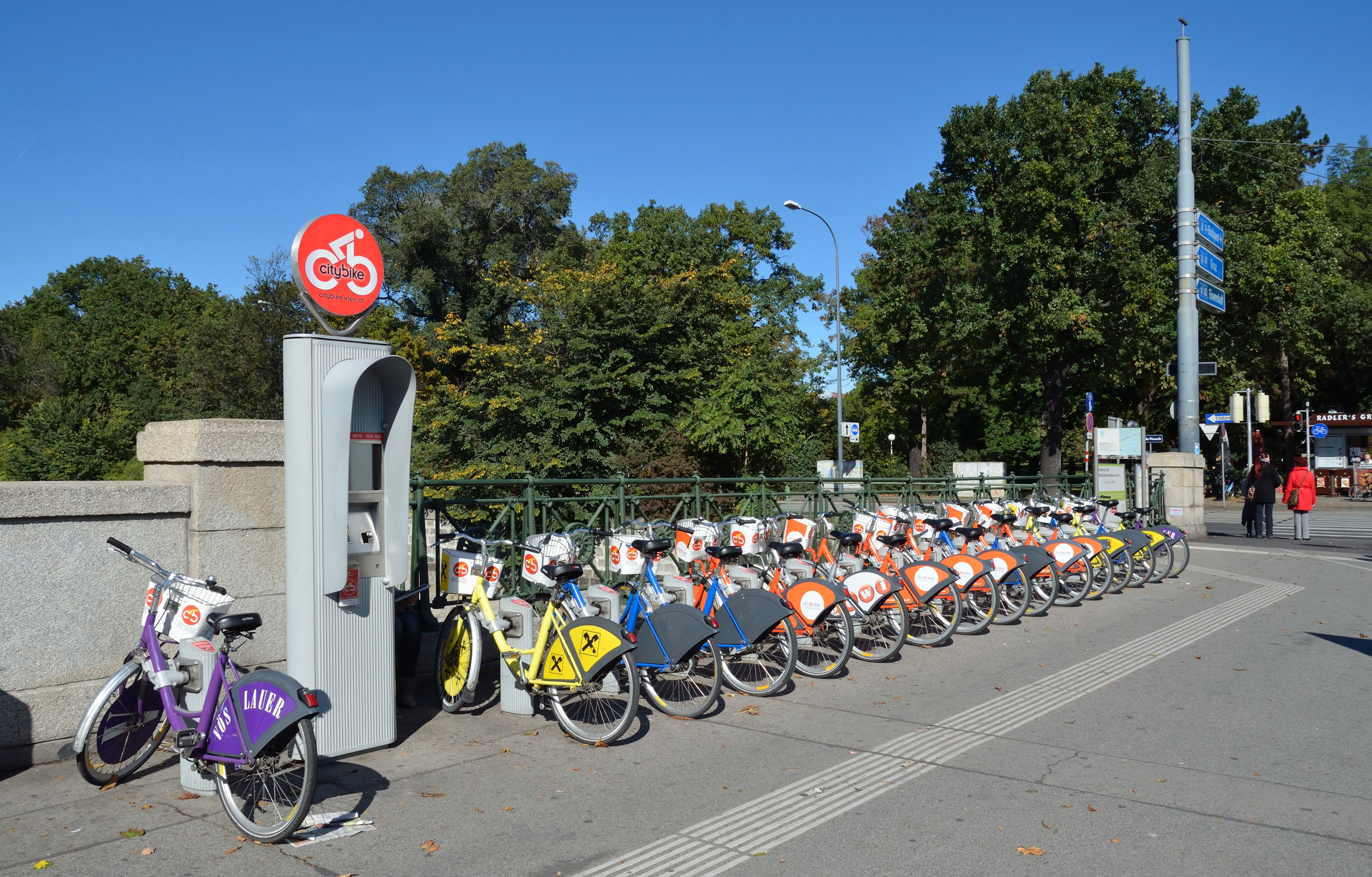
Citybikes in Vienna

The cycling network in the city spans 1,721 kilometres. However, this figure counts bidirectional bike paths twice and includes on-road cycle-lanes, which are also shared with motor vehicles. The network is constantly being expanded and upgraded, especially in the outer areas, such as Donaustadt. Bike use in the city has been rising, from just 3% in 1993 to 11% in 2024.

The city also operates a bicycle-sharing system called WienMobil Radverleih, which offers over 3,000 bikes across 185 stations, available at all times. The bikes are 7-speed city bikes with an adjustable saddle.

=== Airport ===
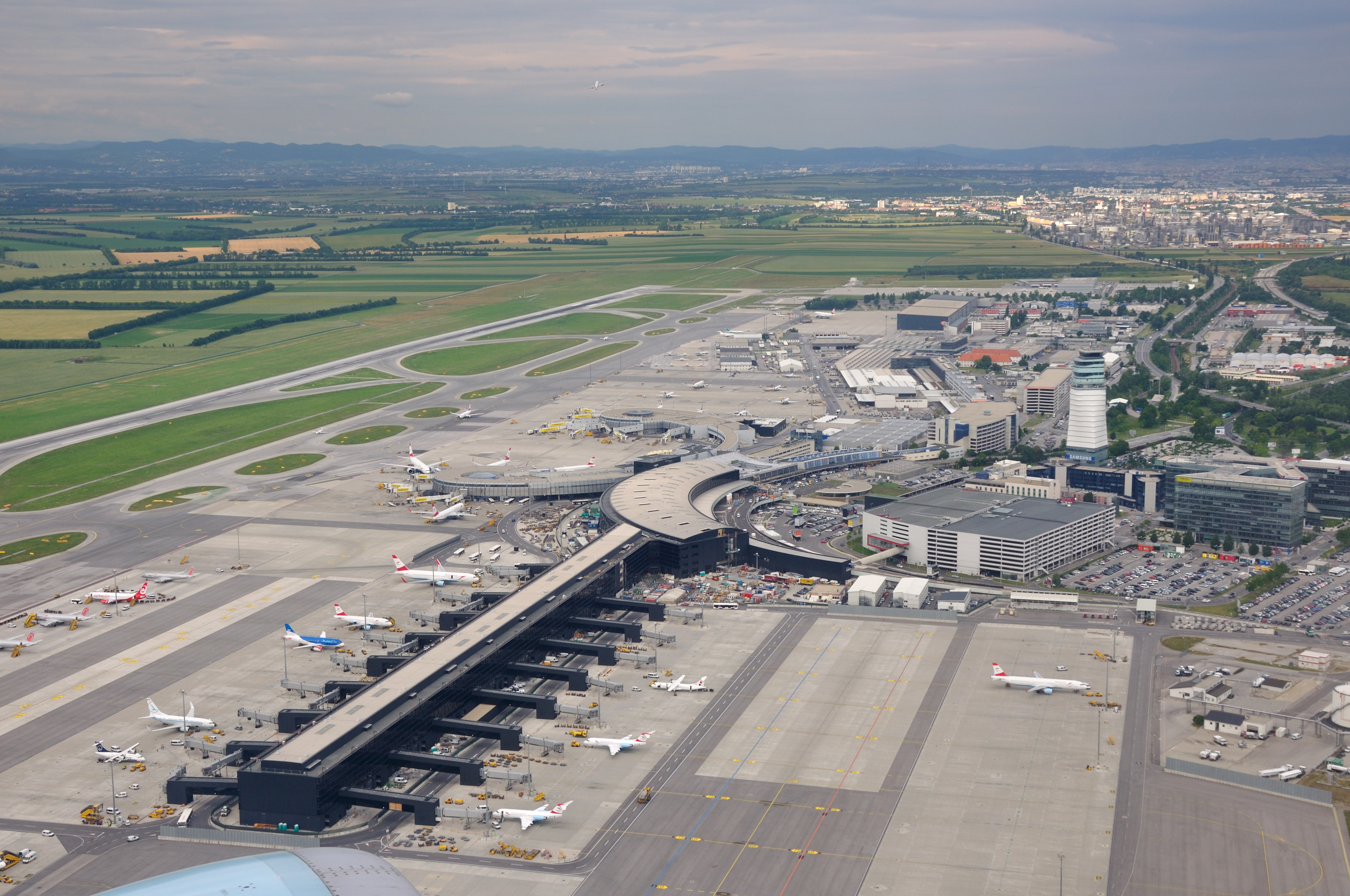
Vienna International Airport

Vienna is served by Vienna International Airport, located 18 km southeast of the city centre near the town of Schwechat. The airport handled approximately 29.5 million passengers in 2023. Following lengthy negotiations with surrounding communities, the airport is set to be expanded to increase its capacity by adding a third runway. The airport is undergoing a major expansion, including a new terminal building that opened in 2012 to accommodate the growing number of passengers. Another option for travellers is to use Bratislava Airport, Slovakia, located approximately 60 km away.

== Economy ==
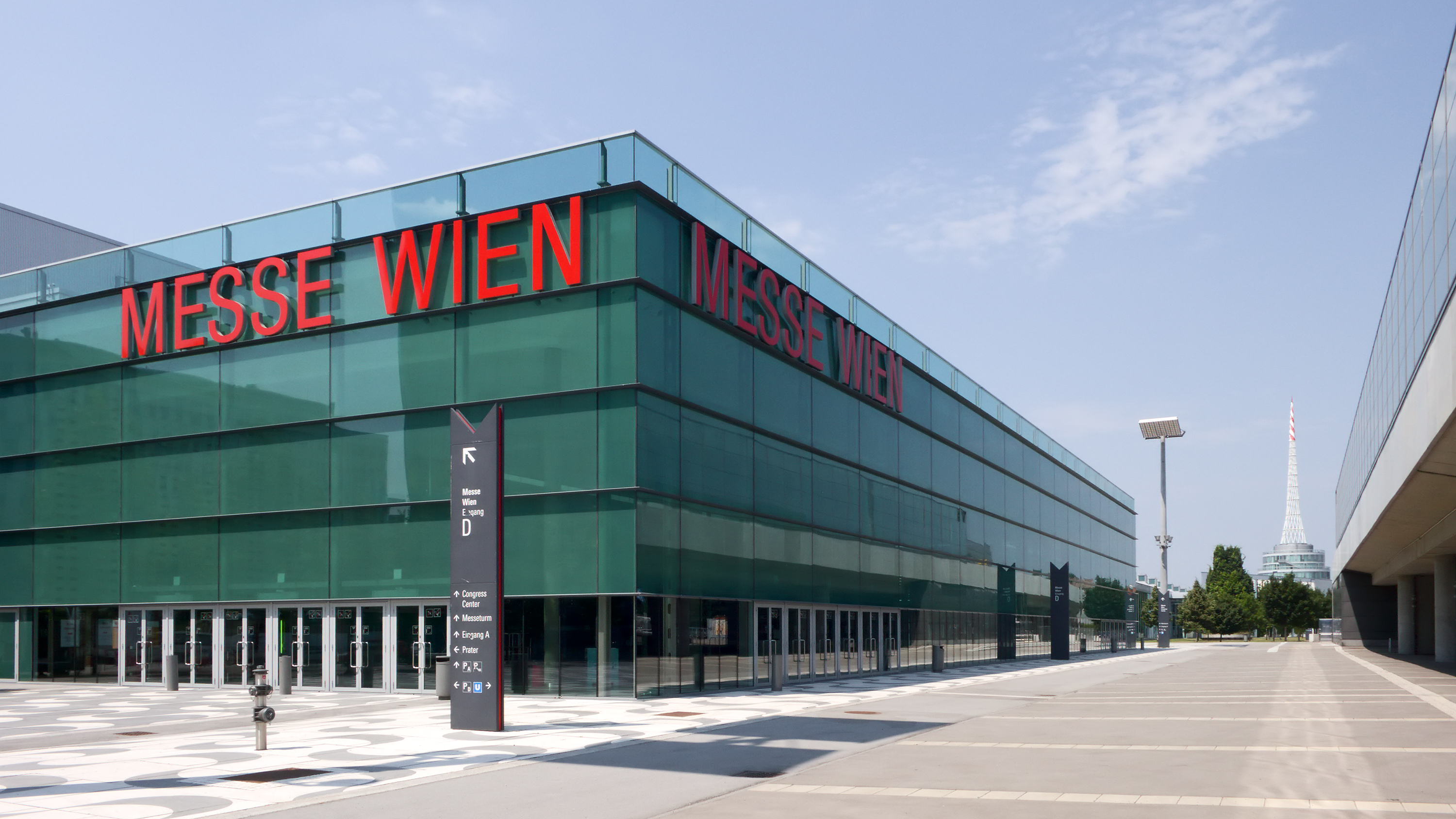
Messe Wien congress centre

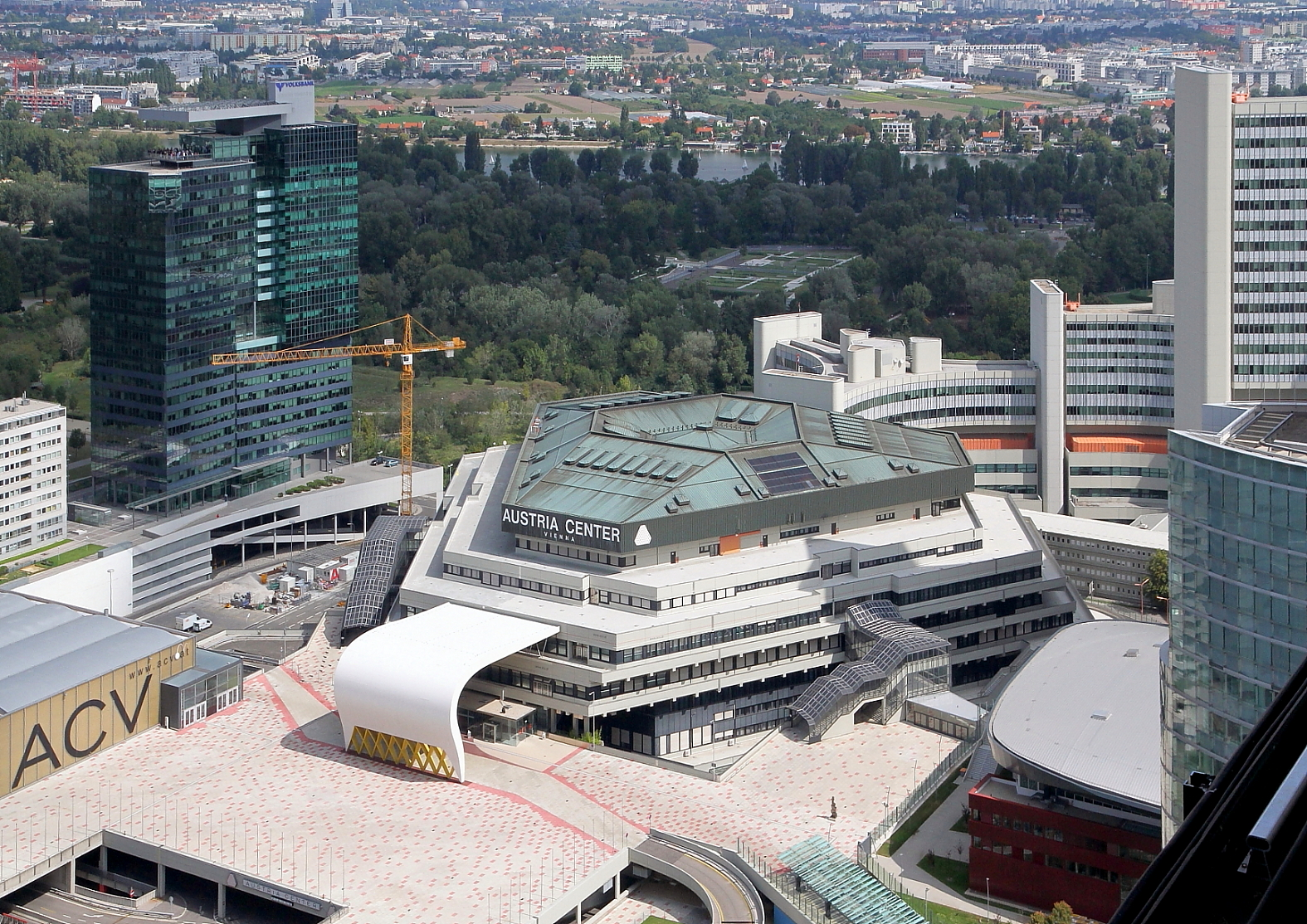
Austria Center Vienna (ACV)

Vienna generates 25.1% of Austria's GDP, making it the highest performing regional economy of the country. It has a GDP per capita of €56,600€ as of 2024. The unemployment rate in Vienna is 9.9% as of 2025, which is the highest of all the states. The private service sector provides 75% of all jobs. The city improved its position from 2012 on the ranking of the most economically powerful cities, reaching number nine on the list in 2015. Of the top 500 Austrian firms measured by turnover, 203 are headquartered in Vienna. As of 2015, 175 international firms maintained offices in Vienna.

Since the fall of the Iron Curtain in 1989, Vienna has expanded its position as a gateway to Eastern Europe. 300 international companies have their Eastern European headquarters in Vienna, including Hewlett-Packard, Henkel, Baxalta, and Siemens.

=== Research and development ===
Bioscience is a major research and development sector in Vienna. The Vienna Life Science Cluster is Austria's major hub for life science research, education, and business. Throughout Vienna, five universities and several basic research institutes form the academic core of the hub with more than 12,600 employees and 34,700 students. Here, more than 480 medical devices, biotechnology and pharmaceutical companies with almost 23,000 employees generate around 12 billion euros in revenue (2017). This corresponds to more than 50% of the revenue generated by life science companies in Austria (22.4 billion euros).

Vienna is home to Boehringer Ingelheim, Octapharma, Ottobock and Takeda Pharmaceutical Company. Companies such as Apeiron Biologics, Hookipa Pharma, Marinomed, mySugr, Themis Bioscience and Valneva operate in Vienna. The Central European Diabetes Association, a cooperative international medical research association, was founded in the city.

=== Information technologies ===
The Viennese sector for information and communication technologies is comparable in size with those of Helsinki, Milan, or Munich, and ranks among Europe's largest locations for information technology. In 2012, 8,962 information technology businesses with a workforce of 64,223 were located in the Vienna region. Among the biggest IT firms in Vienna are Kapsch, Beko Engineering & Informatics, Frequentis, Cisco Systems Austria, Microsoft Austria, IBM Austria and Samsung Electronics Austria.

=== Conferences ===
In 2022, the International Congress and Convention Association (ICCA) ranked Vienna 1st in the world for association meetings. The Union of International Associations (UIA) ranked Vienna 5th in the world for 2019 with 306 international meetings, behind Singapore, Brussels, Seoul and Paris. The city's largest conference centre, the Austria Center Vienna (ACV) has a total capacity for around 22,800 people and is situated next to the United Nations Office at Vienna. Other centres are the Messe Wien Exhibition & Congress Center (up to 3,000 people) and the Hofburg Palace (up to 4,900 people).

=== Tourism ===
There were 17.3 million overnight stays in Vienna in 2023. The top ten incoming markets in 2023 were Germany, the rest of Austria, the United States, Italy, the United Kingdom, Spain, France, Poland, Switzerland, and Romania.

== International relations ==
=== International organizations in Vienna ===
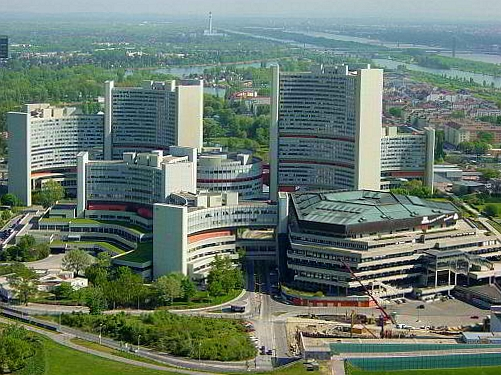
UN complex, with the Austria Center Vienna in front, taken from the Danube Tower in the nearby Donaupark before the extensive building work

In 1980, Vienna became a UN headquarters city, alongside New York City and Geneva, and was later joined by Nairobi. The city hosts numerous international organizations, many of which are located in the Vienna International Centre in Donaustadt, including:

- FRA – European Union Agency for Fundamental Rights
- IAEA – International Atomic Energy Agency
- ICPDR – International Commission for the Protection of the Danube River
- OPEC – Organization of the Petroleum Exporting Countries
  - OPEC Fund – OPEC Fund for International Development
- OSCE – Organization for Security and Co-operation in Europe
- UN – United Nations
  - UNCITRAL – United Nations Commission on International Trade Law
  - UNIDO – United Nations Industrial Development Organization
  - UNODC – United Nations Office on Drugs and Crime
  - UNOOSA – United Nations Office for Outer Space Affairs
  - UNPA – United Nations Postal Administration
  - UNSCEAR – United Nations Scientific Committee on the Effects of Atomic Radiation

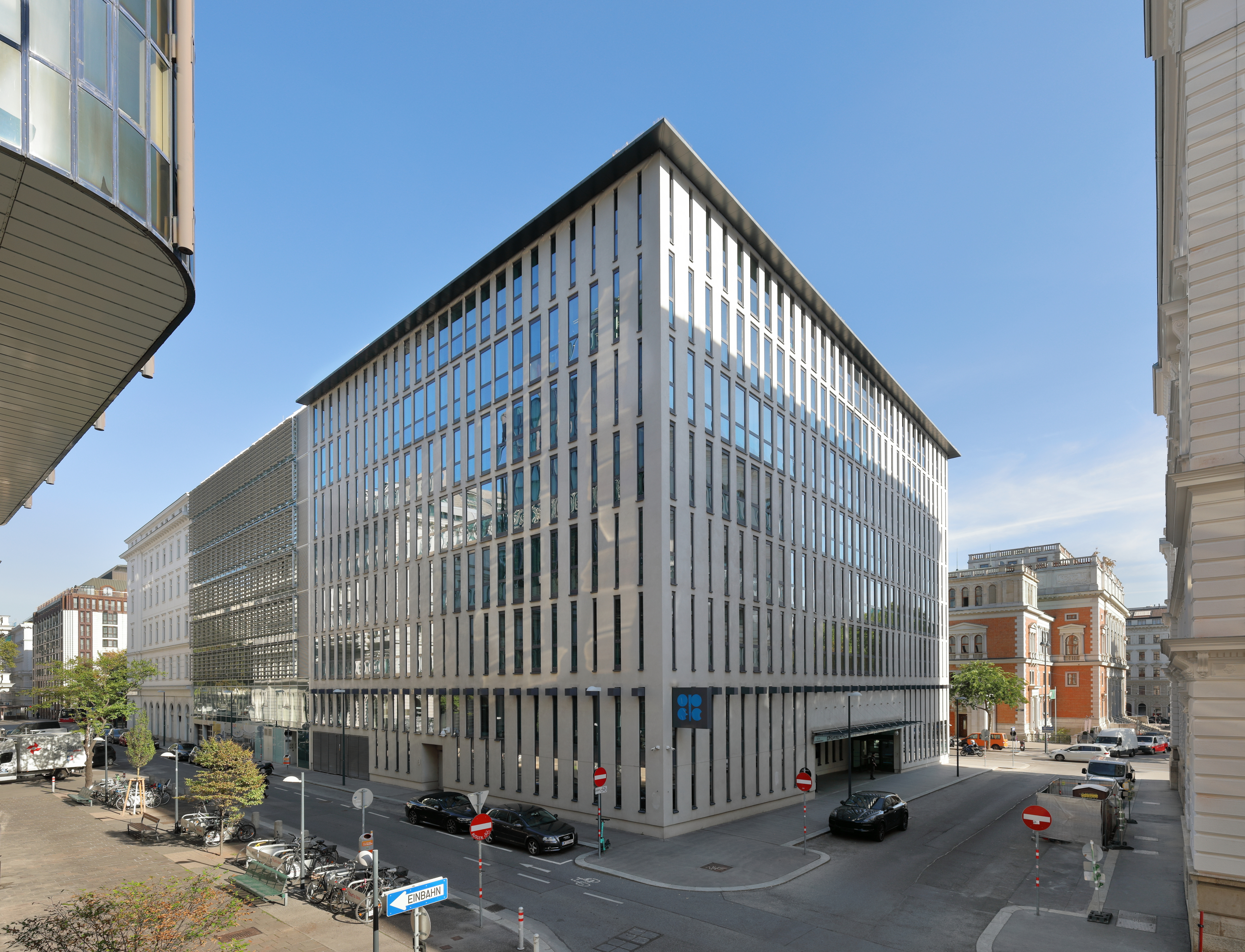
OPEC Secretariat in the Innere Stadt

In addition, the University of Vienna hosts the annual Willem C. Vis Moot, an international commercial arbitration competition for law students from around the world.

Diplomatic meetings were frequently held in Vienna in the latter half of the 20th century, resulting in several significant documents bearing the name Vienna Convention. Among the most important documents are the 1969 Vienna Convention on the Law of Treaties, as well as the 1990 Treaty on Conventional Armed Forces in Europe. Vienna also hosted the negotiations leading to the 2015 Joint Comprehensive Plan of Action on Iran's nuclear program, as well as the Vienna peace talks for Syria.

== See also ==
- Donauinselfest
- List of honorary citizens of Vienna
- List of restaurants in Vienna
- List of tallest buildings in Vienna
- List of Viennese
- List of World Heritage Sites in Austria
- List of cities and towns on the river Danube
- OPENCities
- Outline of Vienna
- Vienna Biennale
- Vienna Porcelain Manufactory
- Viennese German
- Water supply in Vienna
