= List of schools in Austria =

There are more than 5900 schools in Austria, so this list only includes those with Wikipedia articles.

Year	Name	Location
1562	Akademisches Gymnasium Innsbruck	Innsbruck
1553	Akademisches Gymnasium (Vienna)	Vienna
1976	American International School - Salzburg	Salzburg
1959	American International School Vienna	Vienna
	BRG Klagenfurt-Viktring	Klagenfurt
1990	Danube International School Vienna	Vienna
2011	English Teacher Training College	Vorchdorf, Pressbaum, Wolfsberg
1977	Europagymnasium Auhof	Linz
1869	Francisco Josephinum	Wieselburg
1991	Graz International Bilingual School	Graz
1931	GRG 12 Erlgasse	Vienna
1871	Gymnasium Wasagasse	Vienna
1986	International Christian School of Vienna	Vienna
1978	Japanese International School in Vienna	Vienna
1856	Kollegium Kalksburg	Vienna
1992	Linz International School Auhof	Linz
1946	Lycée Français de Vienne	Vienna
1896	Petrinum Linz	Linz
2008	St. Gilgen International School	Salzburg
1807	Schottengymnasium	Vienna
1140	Stiftsgymnasium Melk	Melk
1909	Stilklassen	Berndorf
1959	Vienna International School	Vienna

== See also ==
- Education in Austria
- List of universities in Austria
- List of libraries in Austria
