= List of university and college schools of music =

== Albania ==
- Academy of Arts in Tirana

== Armenia ==
- Yerevan Komitas State Conservatory
- Armenian State Pedagogical University

== Australia ==
- Australian National Academy of Music
- Australian Youth Orchestra
- Australian National University School of Music
- Australian Performing Arts Conservatory
- Box Hill Institute of TAFE
- Elder Conservatorium of Music, University of Adelaide
- Macquarie University
- Melba Memorial Conservatorium of Music
- University of Melbourne
- Melbourne Conservatorium of Music
- Victorian College of the Arts School of Music
- Monash University School of Music
- Queensland Conservatorium Griffith University
- University of Queensland School of Music
- Sydney Conservatorium of Music
- University of Newcastle Conservatorium
- University of Tasmania Conservatorium
- University of Western Australia Conservatorium of Music
- Western Sydney University
- Western Australian Academy of Performing Arts
- University of New South Wales

== Austria ==
- Anton Bruckner Private University for Music, Drama, and Dance
- Musik und Kunst Privatuniversität der Stadt Wien
- Gustav Mahler Privatuniversität für Musik
- Universität für Musik und Darstellende Kunst "Mozarteum" Salzburg (University Mozarteum Salzburg)
- Universität für Musik und darstellende Kunst Wien
- Universität für Musik und darstellende Kunst Graz
- Jam Music Lab Private University for Jazz and Popular Music Vienna

== Azerbaijan ==
- Azerbaijan National Conservatory Music College
- Baku Academy of Music
- Shusha Music School

== Bangladesh ==
- Department of Music, University of Dhaka
- Department of Music, University of Rajshahi

== Belgium ==
- Royal Conservatoire of Antwerp
- Royal Conservatory of Ghent
- Royal Conservatory of Brussels
- Muda Institute
- Lemmensinstituut
- Conservatoire Royal de Liège

== Bosnia and Herzegovina ==
- University of Sarajevo, Sarajevo Music Academy

== Brazil ==
=== Conservatories ===
- Conservatório Brasileiro de Música
- Conservatório Pernambucano de Música
- Conservatório de Tatuí
- Escola de Música da Universidade Federal do Rio de Janeiro
- Escola Municipal de Música de São Paulo
- Conservatorio Municipal de Arte de Guarulhos
- Escola Técnica Municipal de Música e Dança Ivanildo Rebouças - Cubatão

=== Universities and colleges ===
- Universidade Federal do Rio Grande do Sul
- Faculdade Cantareira
- Faculdade de Música do Espírito Santo
- Faculdade Santa Marcelina
- Universidade de Brasília
- Universidade de Campinas
- Universidade de Caxias do Sul
- Universidade de São Paulo
- Universidade Estadual de Maringá
- Universidade Estadual Paulista
- Universidade Federal de Goiás
- Universidade Federal de Minas Gerais
- Universidade Federal de Uberlândia
- Universidade Federal do Espírito Santo
- Universidade Federal do Rio Grande do Norte
- Universidade Federal da Paraíba
- Universidade Federal de Santa Maria
- Universidade Federal do Rio de Janeiro
- Universidade Federal do Estado do Rio de Janeiro - UNIRIO

== Bulgaria ==
=== Plovdiv ===
- Academy of Music, Dance, and Fine Arts

=== Sofia ===
- National Academy of Music

== Canada ==
=== Alberta ===
- Banff Centre
- MacEwan University
- University of Alberta
- University of Calgary
- University of Lethbridge
- The King's University
- Indian Music Academy

=== British Columbia ===
- Vancouver Academy of Music
- Capilano University
- Simon Fraser University
- University of British Columbia
- University of Victoria
- Victoria Conservatory of Music
- Vancouver Island University
- Selkirk College
- Kwantlen Polytechnic University
- British Columbia Conservatory of Music

=== Manitoba ===
- University of Manitoba
- Brandon University

=== New Brunswick ===
- Mount Allison University
- University of Moncton
- University of New Brunswick

=== Newfoundland and Labrador ===
- Memorial University of Newfoundland

=== Nova Scotia ===
- Acadia University
- Dalhousie University
- Maritime Conservatory of Performing Arts
- St. Francis Xavier

=== Prince Edward Island ===
- University of Prince Edward Island
- Holland College

=== Ontario ===
- Brock University
- Carleton University
- Humber College
- Lakehead University
- McMaster University
- Queen's University at Kingston
- Royal Conservatory of Music (Toronto), The Glenn Gould School
- University of Guelph
- University of Ottawa
- University of Toronto, Faculty of Music
- University of Waterloo
- University of Western Ontario
- Wilfrid Laurier University
- York University

=== Quebec ===
==== Anglophone ====
- McGill University Schulich School of Music
- Bishop's University
- Concordia University

==== Francophone ====
- Conservatoire de musique et d'art dramatique du Québec
- Université Laval
- Université de Montréal
- Université de Sherbrooke

=== Saskatchewan ===
- University of Regina
- University of Saskatchewan

== Chile ==
- Escuela Moderna

== China ==
=== Beijing ===
- Central Conservatory of Music
- China Conservatory of Music

=== Tianjin ===
- Tianjin Conservatory of Music

=== Hubei ===
- Wuhan Conservatory of Music

=== Guangdong ===
- Xinghai Conservatory of Music

=== Shanghai ===
- Shanghai Conservatory of Music

=== Shaanxi ===
- Xi'an Conservatory of Music

=== Liaoning ===
- Shenyang Conservatory of Music

=== Sichuan ===
- Sichuan Conservatory of Music

=== Suzhou ===
- Suzhou University School of Music

== Colombia ==
- Pontificia Universidad Javeriana
- Universidad El Bosque
- Universidad de los Andes
- Universidad de Antioquia
- Universidad Nacional de Colombia
- Universidad de Cundinamarca
- Universidad del Cauca
- Conservatory of Tolima
- Universidad de Caldas
- Academia Superior de Artes de Bogotá (ASAB) - Universidad Distrital Francisco José de Caldas
- Universidad EAFIT
- Universidad Sergio Arboleda
- Universidad del Valle
- Universidad Icesi

== Costa Rica ==
- National University of Costa Rica
- University of Costa Rica

== Croatia ==
- Music Academy Zagreb
- Academy of Arts, Osijek
- Academy of Arts, Split
- Juraj Dobrila University of Pula, Department of Music, Pula

== Cyprus ==
- Arte Music Academy
- Music School directed by Alice Christodoulidou
- School of Music Kyriakides

== Czech Republic ==
- Janáček Academy of Music and Performing Arts in Brno
- Musical Academy of Performing Arts in Prague

== Denmark ==
- Rhythmic Music Conservatory, Copenhagen
- Royal Danish Academy of Music, Copenhagen
- Royal Academy of Music in Aarhus
- Danish National Academy of Music, Odense / Esbjerg

== Dominican Republic ==
- Conservatorio Nacional de Música

== Ecuador ==
- Conservatorio de Música Franz Liszt
- Conservatorio Superior Nacional de Música de Quito
- Academia de Música Vivaldi Quito
- Universidad San Francisco de Quito
- Universidad Católica de Santiago de Guayaquil
- Universidad de Especialidades Espíritu Santo

== Egypt ==
- Cairo Conservatoire
- Alexandria Conservatoire
- Cairo Opera House
- Alexandria Opera House
- Le Conservatoire De Musique D' Alexandrie

== Finland ==
- Sibelius Academy
- TAMK - Bachelor of music
- Yousician

== France ==
- Conservatoire national supérieur de musique et de danse de Paris (CNSMDP)
- Conservatoire national supérieur de musique et de danse de Lyon (CNSMDL)
- École supérieure de musique Bourgogne-Franche-Comté, Dijon (ESM, Dijon)
- École supérieure musique et danse Hauts-de-France, Lille (ESMD, Lille)
- Institut d’enseignement supérieur de la musique Europe et Méditerranée (ISEM)
- Institut supérieur des arts de Toulouse (L'isdaT)
- Pôle supérieur d'enseignement artistique Aubervilliers - La Courneuve - Seine-Saint-Denis - Île-de-France (Pôle Sup 93)
- Pôle supérieur d'enseignement artistique Paris Boulogne-Billancourt (PSPBB)
- Pôle d'enseignement supérieur de musique et de danse Bordeaux Nouvelle-Aquitaine (PESMD)
- Pôle d'enseignement supérieur spectacle vivant Bretagne - Pays de la Loire (Pont Supérieur)
- Haute école des arts du Rhin (HEAR) Académie supérieure de musique de Strasbourg
- École normale de musique de Paris (ENMP) (Etablissement privé)

=== Pedagogy ===
- Conservatoire national supérieur de musique et de danse de Paris (CNSMDP)
- Centre de formation des enseignants de danse et de musique (CEFEDEM)
  (Aubagne, Dijon, Toulouse, Bordeaux, Nantes, Metz, Lille, Lyon, Rouen, Poitiers, Rueil-Malmaison)

== Germany ==
=== Universities of Music and Performing Arts ===
- Aachen: Hochschule für Musik Köln, Abt. Aachen
- Augsburg: Leopold Mozart Centre (Leopold-Mozart-Zentrum of the University of Augsburg)
- Berlin: Hochschule für Musik Hanns Eisler
- Berlin: Universität der Künste Berlin
- Bremen: Hochschule für Künste Bremen
- Detmold: Hochschule für Musik Detmold
- Dresden: Hochschule für Musik Carl Maria von Weber Dresden
- Düsseldorf: Robert Schumann Hochschule and the Institute for Music and Media
- Essen: Folkwang Hochschule
- Frankfurt am Main: Frankfurt University of Music and Performing Arts
- Freiburg im Breisgau: Hochschule für Musik Freiburg
- Halle (Saale): Martin Luther University of Halle-Wittenberg, Institut für Musikpädagogik
- Hamburg: Hochschule für Musik und Theater Hamburg
- Hannover: Hochschule für Musik, Theater und Medien Hannover
- Karlsruhe: Hochschule für Musik Karlsruhe
- Köln: Hochschule für Musik Köln
- Leipzig: Felix Mendelssohn College of Music and Theatre
- Lübeck: Musikhochschule Lübeck
- Mainz: Hochschule für Musik Mainz at the Johannes Gutenberg University of Mainz
- Mannheim: Hochschule für Musik und Darstellende Kunst Mannheim
- München: Hochschule für Musik und Theater München
- München: Bayerische Theaterakademie August Everding
- Münster: Westfälische Wilhelms-Universität Münster, Musikhochschule
- Osnabrück: Hochschule Osnabrück, Institute for Music
- Rostock: Hochschule für Musik und Theater Rostock
- Saarbrücken: Hochschule für Musik Saar
- Stuttgart: State University of Music and Performing Arts Stuttgart
- Trossingen: Hochschule für Musik Trossingen
- Weimar: Hochschule für Musik "Franz Liszt", Weimar
- Würzburg: Hochschule für Musik Würzburg
- Wuppertal: Hochschule für Musik Köln, Abt. Wuppertal

=== Universities of Church Music ===
- Aachen: Katholische Hochschule für Kirchenmusik St. Gregorius (closed)
- Bayreuth: Evangelische Hochschule für Kirchenmusik
- Dresden: Evangelische Hochschule für Kirchenmusik
- Görlitz: Hochschule für Kirchenmusik der Evangelischen Kirche Berlin-Brandenburg – schlesische Oberlausitz
- Halle (Saale): Evangelische Hochschule für Kirchenmusik Halle
- Heidelberg: Evangelische Hochschule für Kirchenmusik Heidelberg
- Herford: Evangelische Hochschule für Kirchenmusik
- Regensburg: Hochschule für Katholische Kirchenmusik und Musikpädagogik
- Rottenburg: Katholische Hochschule für Kirchenmusik
- Tübingen: Evangelische Hochschule für Kirchenmusik

=== Conservatories ===
- Berlin: Stern'sches Konservatorium
- Darmstadt: Akademie für Tonkunst
- Frankfurt am Main: Dr. Hoch’s Konservatorium – Musikakademie
- Hamburg: Hamburger Konservatorium
- Kassel: Musikakademie der Stadt Kassel
- Leipzig: Felix Mendelssohn College of Music and Theatre
- Mainz: Peter Cornelius Conservatory (Peter-Cornelius-Konservatorium der Stadt Mainz)
- München: Richard-Strauss-Konservatorium – Fachakademie für Musik der Stadt München
- Nürnberg: Hochschule für Musik Nürnberg
- Osnabrück: Fachhochschule Osnabrück - Konservatorium
- Trossingen: Hohner-Konservatorium

=== Academies of church music ===
- Berlin: Spandauer Kirchenmusikschule (Berliner Kirchenmusikschule)

== Georgia ==
- Tbilisi State Conservatoire
- Ilia State University Music Centre

== Greece ==
=== Universities ===
- National and Kapodistrian University of Athens, Department of Music Studies, Athens, (in Greek and English)
- Aristotle University of Thessaloniki, School of Music Studies, Thessaloniki, (in Greek and English)
- University of Macedonia, Department of Music Science and Art, Thessaloniki, (in Greek and English)
- University of Ioannina, Department of Music Studies, Arta, (in Greek)
- Ionian University, Department of Music Studies, Corfu, (in Greek and English)

=== Conservatories ===
- Athens Conservatoire, Athens, (in Greek)
- National Conservatoire, (in Greek)
- Hellenic Conservatory, (in Greek)
- Philippos Nakas Conservatory, (in Greek)
- State Conservatory of Thessaloniki, Thessaloniki, (in Greek)
- Synchrono Conservatory of Thessaloniki, Thessaloniki, (in Greek)
- Mousiko Kollegio Conservatory, Thessaloniki, (in Greek)
- Nikos Skalkottas Conservatory, Athens, (in Greek)

== Honduras ==
- College for Fine Arts
- Conservatorio Sampedrano de las Artes
- Escuela de Musica Victoriano Lopez

== Hong Kong ==
- The Hong Kong Academy for Performing Arts
- The University of Hong Kong Music Department
- The Baptist University Music Department
- The Chinese University Music Department
- The Education University of Hong Kong Department of Cultural and Creative Arts

== Hungary ==
- Franz Liszt Academy of Music
- University of Debrecen Faculty of Music
- University of Pécs Faculty of Music
- University of Miskolc Faculty of Music
- University of Szeged Faculty of Music
- Széchenyi István University of Győr Faculty of Music

== Iceland ==
- Iceland Academy of the Arts

== India ==
- Central University of Sikkim
- Arunachal University of Studies
- Bhatkhande Music Institute, Lucknow
- University of Calcutta
- Central University of Jharkhand
- Chandigarh University
- Chhatrapati Shahu Ji Maharaj University
- Chinmaya University
- University of Delhi
- Dibrugarh University
- Indira Kala Sangeet University
- University of Kerala
- Lovely Professional University
- University of Madras
- Manipur University
- Martin Luther Christian University
- M.S. University, Baroda
- University of Mumbai
- Prayag Sangeet Samiti
- Rabindra Bharati University
- Raja Mansingh Tomar Music & Arts University
- Sikkim University
- Swar Kala Sangam
- Swarnabhoomi Academy of Music
- Tripura University
- Visva-Bharati University
- Kala Academy
- Pracheen Kala Kendra
- Pt. Bhimsen Joshi Sangeet Academy
- Akhil Bharatiya Gandharva Mahavidyalaya Mandal

== Indonesia ==
- Institut Seni Indonesia Padang Panjang
- Institut Seni Indonesia Yogyakarta
- Universitas Pelita Harapan
- Institut Seni Indonesia Denpasar
- Institut Kesenian Jakarta
- Universitas Kristen Satya Wacana
- Universitas Negeri Surabaya
- Universitas Pasundan
- Universitas HKBP Nommensen
- Sekolah Tinggi Internasional Konservatori Musik Indonesia
- Universitas Universal
- Sekolah Tinggi Seni Musik Bandung
- Universitas Negeri Jakarta
- Universitas Negeri Semarang
- Universitas Negeri Malang
- Universitas Sumatera Utara

== Ireland ==
- DIT Conservatory of Music and Drama
- Royal Irish Academy of Music
- Cork School of Music
- Leinster School of Music & Drama

== Israel ==
- Buchmann-Mehta School of Music (formerly Samuel Rubin Israel Academy of Music), Tel Aviv University Faculty of the Arts
- Israel Conservatory of Music
- Jerusalem Academy of Music and Dance
- Jerusalem Conservatory Hassadna
- Ron Shulamit Conservatory

== Italy ==
=== State conservatories ===
State conservatories are third-level schools entitled to issue academic degrees in music.

- Conservatorio Statale "Domenico Cimarosa" (Avellino)
- Conservatorio Giovanni Battista Martini (Bologna)
- Conservatorio Bruno Maderna (Cesena)
- Conservatorio Luigi Cherubini (Florence)
- Conservatorio Umberto Giordano (Foggia)
- Conservatorio Niccolò Paganini (Genoa)
- Milan Conservatory (Milan)
- Conservatorio San Pietro a Majella (Naples)
- Conservatorio Cesare Pollini (Padua)
- Conservatorio Gioachino Rossini (Pesaro)
- Conservatorio Santa Cecilia (Rome)
- Conservatorio Giuseppe Martucci (Salerno)
- Turin Conservatory (Turin)
- Conservatorio Giuseppe Tartini (Trieste)
- Conservatorio Benedetto Marcello (Venice)
- Conservatorio Jacopo Tomadini (Udine)

For a more complete list of Italian state conservatories, see it:Conservatori di musica in Italia

=== Higher Institutes of Musical Studies ===
Non-state Higher Institutes of Musical Studies are third-level schools as well; they are officially recognized as equivalent to a state conservatory and issue the same academic degrees.

- Istituto superiore di studi musicali della Valle d'Aosta (Aosta)
- Istituto superiore di studi musicali Gaetano Donizetti (Bergamo)
- Istituto superiore di studi musicali Vincenzo Bellini (Caltanissetta)
- Istituto superiore di studi musicali Claudio Merulo (Castelnovo ne' Monti)
- Istituto superiore di studi musicali Claudio Monteverdi (Cremona)
- Istituto superiore di studi musicali Giacomo Puccini (Gallarate)
- Istituto superiore di studi musicali Pietro Mascagni (Livorno)
- Istituto superiore di studi musicali Luigi Boccherini (Lucca)
- Istituto superiore di studi musicali Orazio Vecchi - Antonio Tonelli (Modena and Carpi)
- Istituto superiore di studi musicali P. I. Tchaikovsky (Nocera Terinese)
- Istituto superiore di studi musicali Franco Vittadini (Pavia)
- Istituto superiore di studi musicali Giuseppe Verdi (Ravenna)
- Istituto superiore di studi musicali Achille Peri (Reggio Emilia)
- Istituto superiore di studi musicali Arturo Toscanini (Ribera)
- Istituto superiore di studi musicali Giovanni Lettimi (Rimini)
- Istituto superiore di studi musicali Rinaldo Franci (Siena)
- Istituto superiore di studi musicali Giovanni Paisiello (Taranto)
- Istituto superiore di studi musicali Giulio Briccialdi (Terni)

=== Other institutions ===
There are also other institutions of higher musical education that offer master classes and courses, but they are not legally equivalent to conservatories and are not usually entitled to issue official academic degrees in accordance with the Bologna Process.

- Accademia Musicale Chigiana (Siena)
- Accademia Nazionale di Santa Cecilia (Rome)
- Fiesole School of Music (Fiesole) (also entitled to issue bachelor's degrees in many instruments, including voice)

== Japan ==
- Kunitachi College of Music
- Kyoto City University of Arts
- Musashino Academia Musicae
- Nagoya College of Music
- Osaka College of Music
- Toho Gakuen School of Music
- Tokyo College of Music
- Tokyo University of the Arts
- ESP College of Entertainment Tokyo
- ESP College of Entertainment Osaka
- ESP College of Entertainment Fukuoka
- Musicians Institute Tokyo (MI Tokyo)

== Kazakhstan ==
- Kazakh National University of Arts
- Kazakh National Academy of Arts T K Zhurgenov
- Kazakh National Conservatoire Kurmangazy

== Kenya ==
- MUSEA (Music School of Eastern Africa) (Kisumu)
- Kenya Conservatoire of Music
- Wynton House of Music
- Kenyatta University Music and Dance Department
- Technical University of Kenya Music and Performing Arts
- Kabarak University School of Music and Media
- University of Eastern Africa, Baraton Bachelor of Arts in Music

== Lebanon ==
- Conservatoire Libanais
- Université Saint-Esprit de Kaslik
- Notre Dame University

== Lithuania ==
- Lithuanian Academy of Music and Theatre

== Luxembourg ==
- Escher Conservatoire
- Conservatoire vum Norden
- Conservatoire vun der Stad Lëtzebuerg

== Macau ==
- Macao Polytechnic University, Faculty of Arts and Design

== Malaysia ==
- Universiti Teknologi MARA Shah Alam
- Akademi Seni Budaya & Warisan Kebangsaan (ASWARA) Kuala Lumpur
- Malaysian Institute of Art (MIA)
- SEGI University & College
- Institute of Music, UCSI University
- International College of Music (ICOM)
- Sound & Music Design Academy, LIMKOKWING University
- University of Putra Malaysia (UPM)
- University of Malaya (UM)
- Faculty of Music and Performing Arts, Universiti Pendidikan Sultan Idris/Sultan Idris Education University (UPSI)

== Malta ==
- University of Malta, Music Division within the Mediterranean Institute

== Mexico ==
- UNAM - Facultad de Música
- National Conservatory of Music
- Escuela Superior de Música, CNA
- Conservatorio de las Rosas, Morelia
- Universidad Autónoma de Zacatecas, Unidad Académica de Artes
- Monterrey College of Music and Dance
- Fermatta Music Academy
- Universidad Autónoma de Nuevo León – Facultad de Música
- GMartell College of Music Technology & Audio
- Universidad Autónoma de Chihuahua – Facultad de Artes

== Mongolia ==
- Mongolian State Conservatory

== Morocco ==
- Rabat National Conservatoire of Music and Choreographic Arts
- Rabat Moulay Rachid Conservatoire
- Kenitra Conservatoire de Kénitra
- Fez Conservatoire de Fès
- Music institute in Fez
- Fez: Dar Adyel Center
- Casablanca Conservatoire
- Tétouan Conservatoire
- Tangier Conservatoire
- Chefchaouen Conservatoire
- Ksar El Kébir Conservatoire
- Marrakesh Conservatoire
- Meknès Conservatoire
- Taza Conservatoire
- Oujda Conservatoire
- Safi Conservatoire
- Laayoune Conservatoire
- Demnate Conservatoire
- Essaouira Conservatoire
- Khémisset Conservatoire
- Jerada Conservatoire
- Tiznit Conservatoire
- Beni Mellal Conservatoire
- Salé Conservatoire
- Agadir Conservatoire
- Sidi Kacem Conservatoire
- Temara Conservatoire
- Boujaad Conservatoire

== Netherlands ==
- ArtEZ Conservatorium (Arnhem / Zwolle / Enschede)
- Music Academy Haarlem (Haarlem)
- Conservatorium van Amsterdam (Amsterdam)
- Conservatorium Maastricht (Maastricht)
- Fontys Conservatorium (Tilburg)
- Royal Conservatoire (Den Haag)
- Prince Claus Conservatoire (Groningen)
- Codarts (Rotterdam)
- Utrechts Conservatorium (Utrecht)

== New Zealand ==
- School of Music, National Institute of Creative Arts and Industries, University of Auckland (Auckland)
- Department of Music, Faculty of Arts and Social Sciences, University of Waikato (Hamilton)
- Te Kōkī, the New Zealand School of Music [NZSM] – a joint venture between Victoria University of Wellington and Massey University (Wellington / Albany)
- Nelson School of Music (Nelson)
- School of Music, College of Arts, University of Canterbury (Christchurch)
- School of Music, Languages and Communication; Faculty of Health, Humanities and Science; Christchurch Polytechnic Institute of Technology (Christchurch)
- Department of Music, University of Otago (Dunedin)

== Nicaragua ==
- Polytechnic University of Nicaragua

== Nigeria ==
- Tenstrings Music Institute
- Peter King College of Music
- The Musical Society Of Nigeria (MUSON) School of Music
- University of Port Harcourt Music Department

== Norway ==
- Agder University College, Faculty of Fine Arts (Kristiansand)
- Baratt Due Institute of Music (Oslo)
- Grieg Academy, the department of Music at the University of Bergen
- Norwegian Academy of Music (Oslo)
- Norwegian University of Science and Technology, Department of Music (Trondheim)
- Tromsø University College, Faculty of Art – Music Conservatory
- University of Stavanger, Department of Music and Dance

== Palestine ==
- Edward Said National Conservatory of Music "ESNCM"
- Al Kamandjâti "AK".

== Panama ==
- Universidad de Panamá, Facultad de Bellas Artes

== Peru ==
=== Music Schools and Music Departments ===
- Chiclayo: Escuela de Formación Artística Publica "Ernesto Lopez Mindreau"
- Arequipa: Universidad Nacional de San Agustín - Escuela de Artes
- Ayacucho: Escuela Superior de Música Pública "Condorcunca"
- Cusco: Instituto Superior de Música "Leandro Alviña Miranda"
- Huánuco: Instituto Superior de Música "Daniel Alomía Robles"
- Ica: Escuela Superior de Música "Francisco Pérez Anampa"
- Lima: Ams Campus - Escuela de Música Profesional y Popular
- Lima: Escuela Nacional Superior de Folklore "Jose Maria Arguedas"
- Lima: Universidad Nacional de Música
- Lima: Universidad Nacional de Música (ex Conservatorio Nacional de Música - Página oficial
- Lima: Universidad San Martín de Porres - Instituto de Arte
- Lima: Pontificia Universidad Católica del Perú - Escuela de Música
- Lima: Universidad Peruana de Ciencias Aplicadas - Escuela de Música
- Loreto: Escuela Superior de Música "Lorenzo Luján Darjón"
- Piura: Escuela Superior de Formación Artística Pública "José María Valle Riestra"

=== Conservatories ===
- Arequipa: Conservatorio Regional de Música Luis Duncker Lavalle
- Lima: Conservatorio Nacional de Música
- Lima: Conservatorio de Lima "Josafat Roel Pineda"
- Trujillo: Conservatorio Regional de Música del Norte "Carlos Valderrama"

== Philippines ==
- Centro Escolar University
- De La Salle College of Saint Benilde
- La Consolacion College Manila
- New Era University
- Philippine Normal University
- Philippine Women's University
- Silliman University College of Performing and Visual Arts
- Santa Isabel College Manila
- St. Paul University Manila
- St. Scholastica's College Manila
- University of the Philippines College of Music
- University of San Agustin, Iloilo City
- University of Santo Tomas Conservatory of Music

== Poland ==
- The Fryderyk Chopin University of Music in Warsaw ()
- The Karol Szymanowski Academy of Music in Katowice ()
- The Ignacy Paderewski Academy of Music in Poznan ()
- The Academy of Music in Kraków ()
- The Karol Lipiński University of Music in Wroclaw ()
- The Art Academy of Szczecin ()
- The Academy of Music in Gdańsk ()
- The Academy of Music in Bydgoszcz ()
- The Academy of Music in Łódź ()
- Lviv Conservatory (former Polish–Lithuanian Commonwealth and Poland (until 1945), now within borders of Ukraine)

== Portugal ==
- Department of Music, ILCH, University of Minho
- Escola Superior de Música de Lisboa, Instituto Politécnico de Lisboa
- Escola Superior de Música e Artes do Espectáculo, Instituto Politécnico do Porto
- Escola Superior de Artes Aplicadas, Instituto Politécnico de Castelo Branco
- Academia Nacional Superior de Orquestra
- Department of Music, University of Évora
- Department of Communication and Art, University of Aveiro
- Department of Music, Escola Superior de Educação, Instituto Politécnico do Porto

== Puerto Rico ==
- Conservatorio de Música de Puerto Rico

== Russia ==
- Moscow Conservatory
- St. Petersburg Conservatory
- Gnessin State Musical College
- Kazan Conservatory
- Saratov Conservatory
- Ulyanovsk State University
- Ural State Conservatory
- Moscow State University of Culture and Art
- Murmansk College of Arts

== Slovenia ==
- Academy of Music Ljubljana

== Serbia ==
- University of Arts in Belgrade Faculty of Music
- University of Novi Sad Academy of Arts
- University of Kragujevac Faculty of Philology and Arts
- University of Niš College of Music (closed)
- University of Niš Faculty of Arts
- University of Priština Faculty of Arts

== Singapore ==
- National University of Singapore Yong Siew Toh Conservatory of Music
- Singapore Raffles Music College
- Nanyang Academy of Fine Arts
- Lasalle College of the Arts
- Lee Wei Song School of Music

== South Africa ==
- Department of Music at Nelson Mandela University
- South African College of Music at the University of Cape Town
- Department of Music at the University of Pretoria
- Department of Music at the University of the Witwatersrand
- Conservatorium at the University of Stellenbosch
- NWU School of Music & Conservatory North-West University
- Odeion School of Music at the University of the Free State

== South Korea ==
- Jeju National University
- Chung-Ang University, School of Music, the College of Liberal Arts
- Chonnam National University
- Dong-ah Institute of Media and Arts, Division of Applied Music, Department of Audio Production
- Ewha Womans University, College of Music (established in 1925)
- Hansei University
- Hanyang University
- Howon University, Department of Applied Music
- Keimyung University
- Korea National University of Arts, School of Music
- Kyung Hee University
- Kyungpook National University
- Pusan National University, Department of Music, Department of Korean Music
- Seoul National University, College of Music
- Seoul Jazz Academy
- Sookmyung Women's University, College of Music
- Yonsei University
- University of Seoul

== Spain ==
- Conservatorio Superior de Música de Aragón
- Conservatorio Superior de Música del Liceo
- Escuela Superior de Música de Catalunya
- Escuela Superior de Música Reina Sofía
- Real Conservatorio Superior de Música de Madrid
- Conservatorio Superior de Música "Manuel Castillo" de Sevilla
- Conservatorio Superior de Música "Joaquín Rodrigo" de Valencia
- Conservatorio Superior de Música de A Coruña
- Conservatorio Superior de Música de Vigo
- MUSIKENE Centro Superior de Música del País Vasco
- Conservatorio Superior de Música "Eduardo Martínez Torner" del Principado de Asturias
- Conservatorio Superior de Música de Canarias
- Conservatorio Superior de Música de Castellón
- Conservatorio Superior de Música "Bonifacio Gil" de Badajoz
- Conservatorio Superior de Música de Castilla y León
- Conservatorio Superior de Música "Joaquín Rodrigo" de Valencia
- Conservatorio Superior de Música "Óscar Esplá" de Alicante
- Conservatorio Superior de Música de las Islas Baleares
- Conservatorio Superior de Música de Navarra
- Conservatorio Superior de Música "Rafael Orozco" de Córdoba
- Conservatorio Superior de Música "Victoria Eugenia" de Granada
- Conservatorio Superior de Música de Jaén
- Conservatorio Superior de Música de Málaga

== Sweden ==
- Royal College of Music, Stockholm
- Karlstad University
- University of Gothenburg, department for performing arts and music
- Örebro University, department for music
- Luleå University of Technology, department for music and media
- Lund University, Malmö Academy of Music

== Switzerland ==
- Hochschule Luzern
- Hochschule der Künste Bern
- Zurich University of the Arts
- Hochschule Basel
- EJMA Lausanne
- Geneva University of Music
- Haute école de musique de Lausanne
- Conservatorio della Svizzera italiana

== Taiwan ==
- Fu Jen Catholic University
- National Dong Hwa University College of the Arts
- National Taiwan Normal University
- National Taiwan University of Arts
- Taipei National University of Arts

== Thailand ==
- Mahidol College of Music
- Rangsit Conservatory of Music
- Duriyasilp College of Music
- Mahasarakham College of Music
- Princess Galyani Vadhana Institute of Music
- Faculty of Music, Silpakorn University
- Faculty of Music and Performing Arts, Burapha University

== Uganda ==
- Esom School of Music (Kampala)
- Kiwatule Music School (Kampala)
- Uganda Music Academy

== Ukraine ==
- Lviv Conservatory
- Kyiv Conservatory

== United Kingdom ==
=== England ===
- Academy of Contemporary Music
- Access to Music
- Brighton Institute of Modern Music
- Guildhall School of Music and Drama
- London College of Music
- Leeds College of Music
- Royal Academy of Music
- Royal Birmingham Conservatoire
- Royal College of Music
- Royal Holloway
- Royal Northern College of Music
- Tech Music Schools
- Trinity College of Music

=== Scotland ===
- Royal Conservatoire of Scotland

=== Wales ===
- Royal Welsh College of Music & Drama, Cardiff
- Cardiff University School of Music
- Wales International Academy of Voice, Cardiff

== United States ==
- California
  - California Institute of the Arts
  - California State University, Fullerton
  - California State University, Long Beach Bob Cole Conservatory of Music
  - California State University, Northridge
  - California State University, Sacramento School of Music
  - Colburn School
  - San Francisco Conservatory of Music
  - University of California, Berkeley School of Music
  - University of California, Los Angeles Herb Alpert School of Music
  - University of Southern California Thornton School of Music
  - University of the Pacific Conservatory of Music
- Colorado
  - Colorado State University, School of Music, Theatre and Dance
  - University of Colorado Boulder College of Music
- Connecticut
  - University of Hartford Hartt School
  - Yale University
- District of Columbia
  - Catholic University Benjamin T. Rome School of Music
- Florida
  - Florida A&M (FAMU)
  - Florida Atlantic University
  - Florida Southern College
  - Florida State University College of Music
  - Full Sail University
  - Palm Beach Atlantic University
  - Palm Beach State College
  - Rollins College
  - Southeastern University
  - Stetson University
  - University of Miami Frost School of Music
  - University of Florida
  - University of Central Florida
  - University of North Florida
  - University of South Florida
  - University of Tampa
- Idaho
  - University of Idaho
- Illinois
  - Chicago College of Performing Arts of Roosevelt University
  - Columbia College Chicago Music Department
  - DePaul University
  - Illinois State University
  - North Park University
  - Northeastern Illinois University
  - Northern Illinois University
  - Northwestern University Bienen School of Music
  - Southern Illinois University Carbondale School of Music
  - Southern Illinois University Edwardsville School of Music
  - University of Chicago
  - University of Illinois at Chicago
  - University of Illinois School of Music (Urbana, IL)
  - Wheaton College Conservatory of Music
- Indiana
  - Butler University
  - DePauw University School of Music
  - Indiana University Jacobs School of Music
  - University of Notre Dame Department of Music
- Iowa
  - Luther College
  - University of Iowa
  - University of Northern Iowa School of Music
- Kansas
  - University of Kansas
  - Kansas State University School of Music, Theatre and Dance
- Kentucky
  - University of Louisville
- Louisiana
  - Louisiana State University
  - Loyola University
  - Tulane University
  - University of New Orleans
- Maine
  - University of Southern Maine School of Music
- Maryland
  - Peabody Conservatory of Johns Hopkins University
  - University of Maryland School of Music
- Massachusetts
  - Berklee College of Music
  - Boston Conservatory
  - Boston University
  - Longy School of Music
  - New England Conservatory of Music
- Michigan
  - University of Michigan School of Music, Theatre & Dance
  - Michigan State University College of Music
  - Central Michigan University School of Music
- Minnesota
  - Concordia College
  - McNally Smith College of Music
  - St. Olaf College
  - University of Minnesota School of Music
- Mississippi
  - Mississippi Christian University
  - University of Southern Mississippi
  - University of Mississippi
- Missouri
  - University of Missouri School of Music
  - University of Missouri-Kansas City
- Nevada
  - University of Nevada, Las Vegas (UNLV)
- New Jersey
  - Kean Jersey City
  - Kean University
  - Montclair State University
  - Ramapo College
  - Rowan University
  - Rutgers University New Brunswick
  - Rutgers University Newark
  - Westminster Choir College
  - William Paterson University
  - Cairn University
- New York
  - Bard College Conservatory of Music
  - Brooklyn College Conservatory of Music
  - Five Towns College
  - Houghton College Greatbatch School of Music
  - Ithaca College School of Music, Theatre, and Dance
  - Juilliard School
  - Manhattan School of Music
  - Mannes College of Music
  - New York University, Steinhardt School
  - Syracuse University Setnor School of Music
  - The New School for Jazz and Contemporary Music
  - City College of New York
  - SUNY-Albany
  - SUNY-Fredonia School of Music
  - SUNY-Potsdam Crane School of Music
  - SUNY-Purchase Conservatory of Music
  - University of Rochester Eastman School of Music
- North Carolina
  - Appalachian State University Mariam Cannon Hayes School of Music
  - East Carolina University School of Music
  - High Point University
  - University of North Carolina at Greensboro School of Music, Theatre and Dance
  - University of North Carolina School of the Arts
  - Western Carolina University
- North Dakota
  - North Dakota State University Challey School of Music
- Ohio
  - Baldwin-Wallace Conservatory of Music
  - Bowling Green State University, College of Musical Arts
  - Cleveland Institute of Music
  - Kent State University
  - Oberlin Conservatory
  - Ohio State University
  - University of Akron
  - University of Cincinnati College-Conservatory of Music
  - Wright State University
  - Youngstown State University
- Oklahoma
  - Oklahoma City University
  - University of Oklahoma
  - University of Central Oklahoma
- Oregon
  - University of Oregon
- Pennsylvania
  - Carnegie Mellon School of Music
  - Curtis Institute of Music
  - Duquesne University Mary Pappert School of Music
  - Indiana University of Pennsylvania
  - Lebanon Valley College
  - Mercyhurst College
  - Messiah University
  - Pennsylvania State University
  - Sunderman Conservatory of Music at Gettysburg College
  - Temple University
  - University of Pennsylvania
  - University of the Arts
  - West Chester University
- Puerto Rico
  - Conservatory of Music of Puerto Rico
- South Carolina
  - College of Charleston
  - University of South Carolina
  - Furman University Department of Music
- Tennessee
  - Austin Peay State University
  - Belmont University
  - Middle Tennessee State University
  - Tennessee Technological University
  - University of Memphis
  - University of Tennessee, Knoxville
  - University of Tennessee, Martin
  - Vanderbilt University Blair School of Music
  - Visible Music College
- Texas
  - Baylor University
  - East Texas A&M University School of Music
  - Houston Christian University School of Music (SoM)
  - Rice University Shepherd School of Music
  - Stephen F. Austin State University Micky Elliott College of Fine Arts School of Music
  - Texas Christian University Schoo of Music
  - Texas Tech University School of Music
  - University of Texas Sarah and Ernest Butler School of Music
  - University of North Texas College of Music
  - University of Houston Moores School of Music
  - West Texas A&M University School of Music
- Utah
  - Brigham Young University School of Music
  - University of Utah School of Music
- Virginia
  - Batten University
  - George Mason University
  - James Madison University
  - Liberty University
  - Virginia Commonwealth University School of the Arts
  - Christopher Newport University
  - Norfolk State University
  - Old Dominion University
  - Shenandoah University
  - Hampton University
- Washington
  - Cornish College of the Arts
  - Gonzaga University Department of Music
  - Pacific Lutheran University Department of Music
  - University of Puget Sound School of Music
  - University of Washington
- West Virginia
  - West Virginia University
  - Marshall University
  - Shepherd University
- Wisconsin
  - Lawrence Conservatory of Music, Lawrence University
  - University of Wisconsin–Madison
  - University of Wisconsin–Milwaukee

== Venezuela ==
=== Escuelas ===
- Caracas: Escuela Superior de Música José Ángel Lamas
- Caracas: Escuela de Música Lino Gallardo
- Caracas: Escuela de Música Juan Manuel Olivares
- Caracas: Escuela de Música José Reyna
- Caracas: Escuela de Música Pedro Nolasco Colon
- La Grita: Escuela de Música Santa Cecilia
- Rubio: Escuela de Música Francisco J. Marciales
- San Cristóbal: Escuela de Música Miguél Ángel Espinel
- Trujillo: Escuela de Música Esteban Razquin

=== Conservatorios ===
- Venezuela Fundación del Estado para el Sistema Nacional de las Orquestas Juveniles e Infantiles de Venezuela
- Carabobo: Conservatorio de Musica de Carabobo
- Caracas: Conservatorio de Música Simón Bolívar
- Caracas: Conservatorio Nacional de Música Juan José Landaeta
- Lara: Conservatorio Vicente Emilio Sojo

=== Universidades ===
Pedagogía en Música:

- Universidad de Carabobo (UC)
- Universidad Pedagógica Experimental Libertador (UPEL)

Licenciatura en Artes mención Música

- Carabobo: Universidad Arturo Michelena (UAM)
- Caracas: Universidad Central de Venezuela (UCV)

Licenciatura en Música

- Caracas: Universidad Nacional Experimental de las Artes (UNEARTE)(antiguo IUDEM)
- Lara: Universidad Centroccidental Lisandro Alvarado (UCLA)
- Mérida: Universidad de Los Andes (Venezuela) (ULA)
- Táchira: Universidad Nacional Experimental Abierta (UNET)
- Zulia: Universidad Católica Cecilio Acosta (UNICA)
- Zulia: Universidad del Zulia (LUZ)

Maestría en Música

- Caracas: Universidad Simon Bolivar (USB)

Maestría en Musicología

- Caracas: Universidad Central de Venezuela (UCV)
