= List of libraries in Austria =

This is a list of libraries in the Republic of Austria.

== National libraries ==
- Austrian National Library (Österreichische Nationalbibliothek), Vienna
- Austrian Academy of Sciences Library (Bibliothek der Österreichischen Akademie der Wissenschaften), Vienna

== Government libraries ==
- Administrative Library of the Austrian Federal Chancellery (Administrative Bibliothek des Bundes), Vienna
- Federal Educational Library for Lower Austria (Bundesstaatliche Pädagogische Bibliothek für Niederösterreich), St. Pölten
- Library of the Federal Institute for Agriculture, (Bibliothek der Bundesanstalt für Agrarwirtschaft), Vienna

== State and regional libraries ==
- Burgenländische Landesbibliothek, Burgenland
- Kärntner Landesbibliothek, Carinthia
- Niederösterreichische Landesbibliothek, Lower Austria
- Oberösterreichische Landesbibliothek, Upper Austria
- Universitäts- und Landesbibliothek Salzburg, Salzburg
- Steiermärkische Landesbibliothek, Steiermark
- Universitäts- und Landesbibliothek Tirol, Tirol
- Vorarlberger Landesbibliothek, Vorarlberg
- Wienbibliothek im Rathaus, the library of the city and state of Vienna

== City libraries ==
- Büchereien Wien, the municipal library system of Vienna
- Stadtbücherei Bregenz
- Stadtbücherei Dornbirn
- Stadtbücherei Eisenstadt
- Stadtbibliothek Feldkirch
- Stadtbibliothek Graz
- Stadtbücherei Innsbruck
- Stadtbücherei Leonding
- Stadtbibliothek Linz
- Stadtbibliothek Salzburg
- Stadtbücherei St. Pölten
- Stadtbücherei Steyr
- Stadtbücherei Wels
- Stadtbücherei Wiener Neustadt

== Specialized libraries ==
- Admont Abbey Library
- Altenburg Abbey Library
- ANNO (Austrian Newspapers Online), an online library
- Bibliothek von unten, a left-wing, alternative library in Vienna
- Esperanto library, Vienna
- Austrian Chamber of Labor Library for Social Sciences, Vienna
- Fotohof, a contemporary photography library in Salzburg
- Klosterneuburg Abbey Library
- Kremsmünster Abbey Library
- Melk Abbey Library
- Michaelbeuern Abbey Library
- Saint Paul's Abbey, Lavanttal

== Higher education libraries ==
=== Fachhochschule ===
- Bibliothek der Fachhochschule St. Pölten
- Bibliothek der Fachhochschule Vorarlberg
- Fachhochschulbibliothek Kärnten

=== Hochschule ===
- Bibliothek der Hochschule für Agrar- und Umweltpädagogik Vienna
- Bibliothek der Philosophisch-Theologischen Hochschule St. Pölten

=== Universities ===
- University Library of Vienna (Universitätsbibliothek Wien), the largest research library in Austria
- University Library of Graz (Universitätsbibliothek Graz), Graz
- Universitätsbibliothek University of Innsbruck
- Universitätsbibliothek University of Klagenfurt
- Library, University for Continuing Education Krems, Krems an der Donau
- Universitätsbibliothek University of Leoben
- Universitätsbibliothek University of Linz
- Universitätsbibliothek Mozarteum Salzburg
- Universitätsbibliothek University of Salzburg
- Universitätsbibliothek der Akademie der bildenden Künste Wien
- Universitätsbibliothek der Medizinischen Universität Wien
- Universitätsbibliothek der Technischen Universität Wien
- Universitätsbibliothek der Universität für Angewandte Kunst Wien
- Universitätsbibliothek der Universität für Bodenkultur Wien
- Universitätsbibliothek der Universität für Musik und darstellende Kunst Wien
- Universitätsbibliothek der Veterinärmedizinischen Universität Wien
- Universitätsbibliothek der Wirtschaftsuniversität Wien

== Library organizations ==
- Österreichischer Bibliothekenverbund, catalogue and service collaboration for Austrian libraries

== See also ==
- Libraries in Vienna
- Library associations in Austria
- List of libraries in Germany
- Liechtensteinische Landesbibliothek
- List of schools in Austria
- List of universities in Austria
- Open access in Austria

== Bibliography ==
- Friedrich Buchmayr [in German] (2004). "Secularization and Monastic libraries in Austria". In James Raven (ed.). Lost libraries: the destruction of great book collections since antiquity. Palgrave Macmillan. ISBN 1403921199.
