= 2009 student protests in Austria =

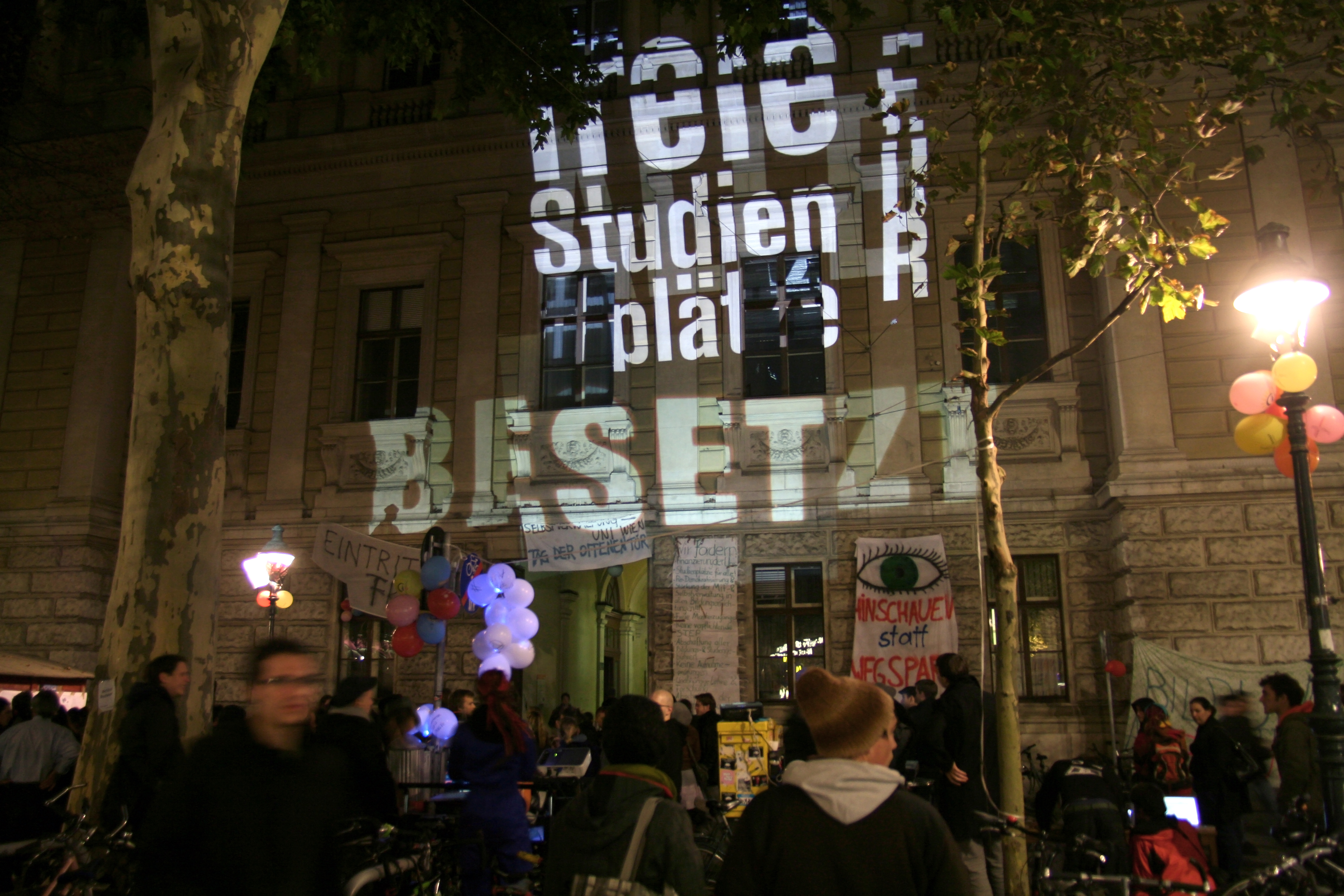
Protests and occupation at the University of Vienna, October 2009.

In the wake of student protests in Austria since the end of October 2009 against restrictions on the access to higher education, many Austrian universities' lecture halls and rooms were occupied, including the two largest auditoriums in Austria at the University of Vienna.

The protests represent the largest Austrian education protests in recent years and led to a broad discussion about education policy. Personalities from the worlds of education, politics, civil society, trade unions, the arts and culture, and the media have commented on the protests and showed solidarity to some extent. The protesters represent grass-roots-efforts and are democratically organized; the internet plays a central role in communication. In addition to the demonstrations, various working groups were formed and started further actions. In the occupied rooms, plenaries were held to come to decisions, and cultural and educational events took place. The demands of the protesters include funding for and democratization of the universities, as well as the abolition or non-introduction of tuition fees. A central slogan of the protests is "education instead of vocational education" (Bildung statt Ausbildung). The protests often run under the joint symbolic motto "university on fire" (Uni brennt) or "our university" (Unsere Uni).

== Occupations ==
The protests started with the occupation of the assembly hall of the Academy of Fine Arts Vienna by a group of students and teaching staff on 20 October 2009. They protested against the rector's office's introduction of the Bologna process. After declaring solidarity, the Audimax of the University of Vienna was spontaneously occupied on 22 October 2009. Henceforward, plenums, where grass-roots discussions and votings were held, took place in occupied lecture halls. Numerous work groups were formed, which were the main organizers of the occupation besides the plenums.

After 22 October, the protests extended to other universities. On 23 October, the pre-clinic of the University of Graz was occupied by approximately 50 students. On 27 October, facilities at the University of Vienna and the TU Wien, as well as the assembly hall at the University of Klagenfurt and lecture hall 1 at the Johannes Kepler University Linz, were occupied. 28 October saw the occupation of lecture hall 381 at the University of Salzburg by 300 people after a protest rally. Facilities of the University of Innsbruck and the Graz University of Technology were occupied on 29 October 2009. Further, parts of the University of Arts Linz were occupied on 3 November. In consultation with the rector's office, several vacant rooms at the Türkenwirt-building of the University of Natural Resources and Life Sciences, Vienna, were occupied on 28 October. The occupiers’ demands included a transformation of the vacant building into a long called for “students’ house” (“Haus der Studierenden”).

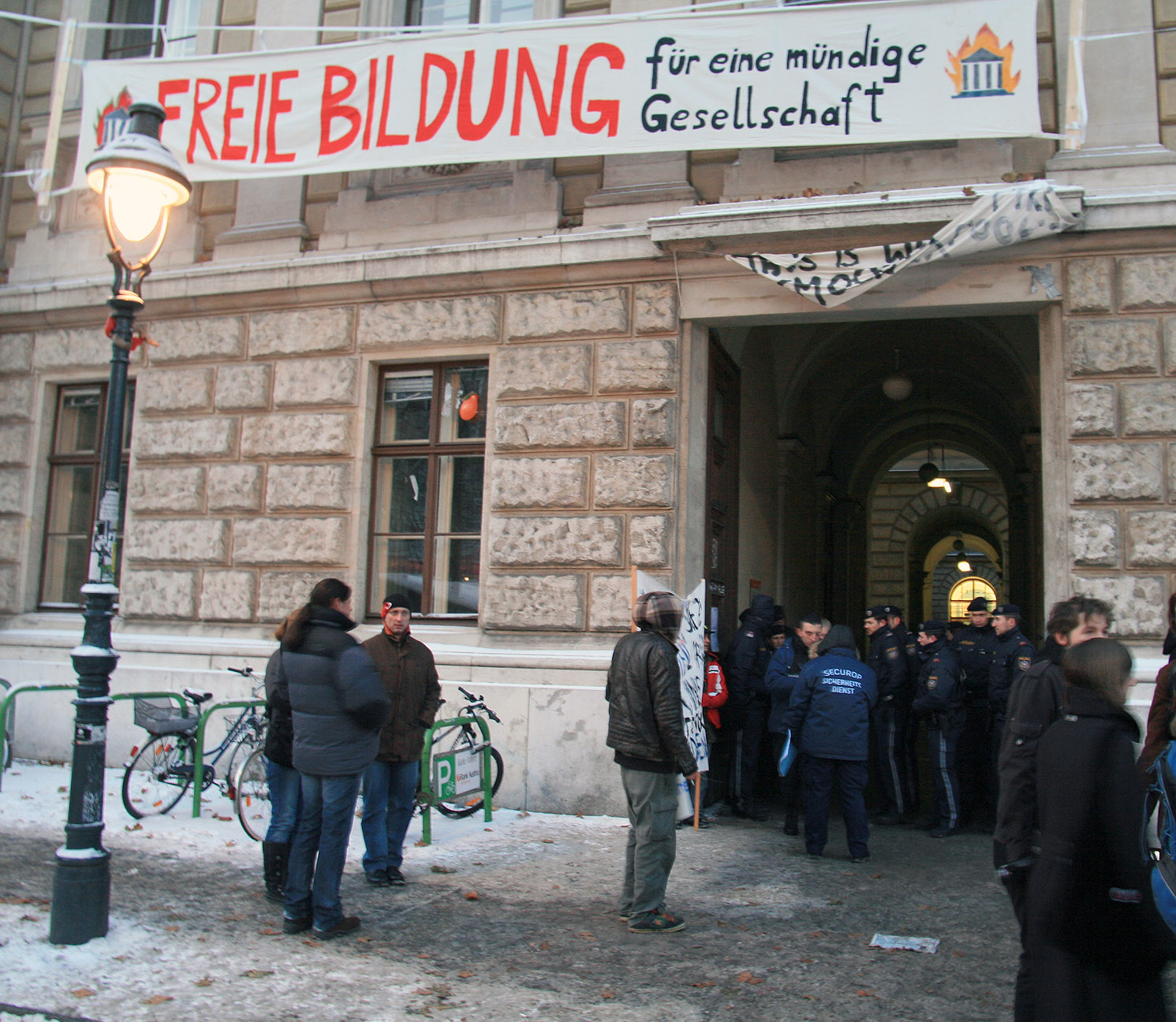
Eviction of the protesters from the Auditorium Maximum of the University of Vienna after 61 days of occupation by students

Therefore, facilities at 11 university locations across Austria, mostly large lecture halls and assembly halls, were under occupation, often with the rector's office's acceptance and active support. With the exception of the Vienna University of Economics and Business, lecture halls at 4 of the 5 biggest universities in Austria were occupied, among which is the biggest university in German-speaking countries, the University of Vienna. On the morning of 21 December 2009, the 61st day of the protests, the Audimax of the University of Vienna was evicted in the presence of the police after a resolution of the rector's office. At the time of the eviction, approximately 15 students and 80 homeless people were present in the room. Lecture hall C1 stayed occupied until its eviction on 6 January 2010.

On May 10, short-term occupations occurred in reaction to the closing of the last space which was provided for the movement. Approximately 50 people occupied the rector's office of the University of Vienna for almost two hours and subsequently, the Audimax was also occupied for the same period by up to 300 people. In both cases, the students left the rooms after the police read out the eviction order. On May 14, a small group occupied the Department of Commerce for half an hour. Prior to this, the exit from the university dialogue was announced during a joint press conference of the ÖH and "unibrennt".

== Reactions ==
=== Media ===
The protests were perceived differently throughout the media. The Austrian left-liberal newspaper "Der Standard", which sent staff members to the auditorium on the first day of the protest to report live on derstandard.at's website, reported the most extensively about the protest movement. Furthermore, the second, more conservative German quality newspaper "Die Presse" initially observed the movement rather cautiously and mainly criticized the nature and goals of the protest. "Der Kurier", a daily newspaper with the widest-circulation in Austria also hit a similar mark, emphasizing on the necessity of restricting the access to higher education. The newspaper claims that the nightly concerts, parties and the therewith associated consumption of luxury foods outweighed the protest activities. The country's highest-circulation newspaper called "Kronen Zeitung" did not seem to sympathize with neither the student's approach nor the reactions of the politicians. One the one hand, misleading short messages were launched, such as those about a supposedly "hooded demonstrator", who in fact wore respiratory protection while spraying an easel, and on the day of the demonstration on November 5, the commentator Michael Jeannée displayed his dislike against the Audimax occupants by publishing a letter called "University rebels cause chaos in Vienna". On the other hand, "Krone" editorial writer Claus Pandí criticized the "misjudgments" of the politicians, who, according to him, collectively ignore and deny the university injustices. Internationally, German-speaking countries in particular showed interest in the protests. On November 5, 2009, the widely-known German newspaper "Die Zeit" dedicated its title page to the student protests in Austria with a red-white-red background. Additionally, the French daily newspaper "Le Monde" gave a detailed report on the protests in Austria during the first week of the occupation. But even outside of Europe, many media outlets dealt with the student protests. The Russian state television for instance showed a report devoted exclusively to the situation in Austria in a news program. In 2010, the documentary #unibrennt - Bildungsprotest 2.0 was published by the "AG Doku" and produced by coop99. The documentary captures the movement of university occupations in Germany and Austria and the exemplary significance of the occupation of the University of Vienna.

== Aftermaths and consequences ==
Small financial successes were achieved by the students of the BOKU. A "students' house" ("Haus der Studierenden") that had been claimed for years was made available in the up-to-then vacant second floor of the property “Türkenwirt” (Tüwi) by the rector's office of the ÖH. At the University of Salzburg, commitments were made by the rector's office to fulfil part of the receivables such as in the case of regular listener's congregations or greater participation in the faculty councils. Similarly, work groups consisting of both members of the university and students were formed, dealing with study law, with the improved flow of information and greater transparency, as well as the creation of free space for students. In contrast, the occupied lecture hall will be released over the Christmas holidays. In Vienna, the university management announced a competition focusing on the presentation of the foyer of the second largest lecture hall, the C1 on Campus. After the eviction of the occupations, various furniture and tables were placed for utilization but finally removed after a few months. On the basis of a list of requirements or rather the long-standing requirement of an Institute of International Developments of the University of Vienna, as a result of the protests, the provisional establishment of the research platform International Development could be achieved along with the means and the premises for the students. At Ars Electronica, #unibrennt was awarded with the prize for their 2.0 link to Ars Electronica in the Digital Communities category. Taken as a whole, the protests resulted in no immediate crucial changes to Austrian higher education policy.
