= OBV =

OBV may refer to any of the following:

- On-balance volume, a technical analysis indicator
- Operation Black Vote, non-partisan and not-for-profit national organisation established in 1996 to address the British black and ethnic minority democratic deficit
- Österreichischer Bibliothekenverbund, a catalogue and service collaboration for Austrian libraries
