= Hermann Krupp =

Austrian entrepreneur

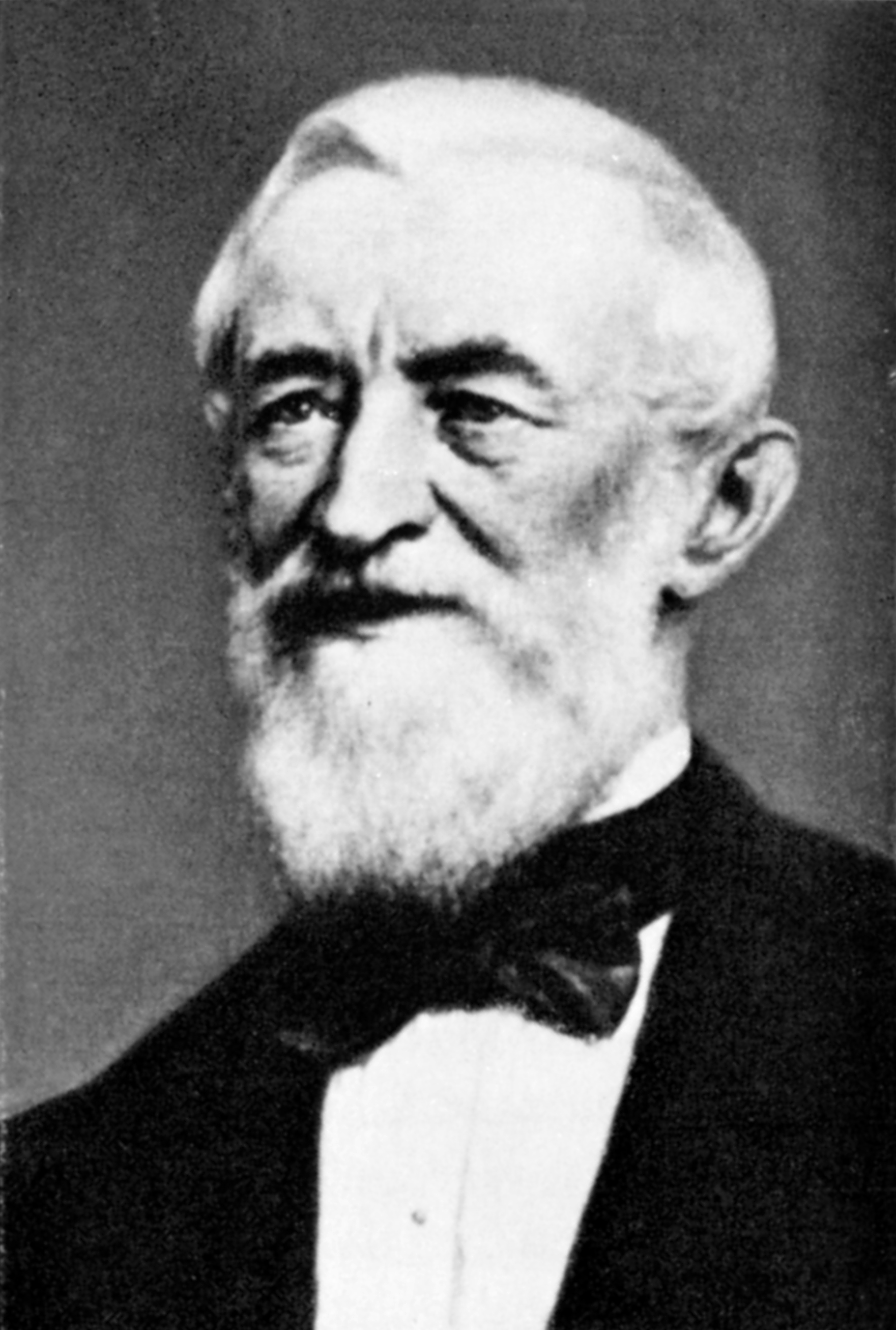
Hermann Krupp

Hermann Krupp (15 February 1814 – 25 July 1879) was an Austrian entrepreneur, founder of the Austrian branch of the Krupp family.

== Life ==
He was born in Essen, Germany, as the third child of Friedrich Krupp and his wife, Therese Wilhelmi. His brother was Alfred Krupp. After finishing his studies at the Burggymnasium Essen in Essen, he was apprenticed in Solingen. During his spare time, he worked at his father’s shop.

He became the mechanical director of Berndorfer Metallwarenfabrik in Berndorf, which was founded by his brother, Alfred. In 1847 he met with Marie Baum, daughter of the rich Daniel Baum, whom he married at the same year. They lived near the Berndorfer Metallwarenfabrik in every summer and in Vienna, opposite the Metallwarenfabrik's city offices.

Hermann Krupp was Protestant, while his wife Marie was Catholic. To reflect it, sons were Protestants, daughters became Catholics. They had six children.

Hermann Krupp was fond of his work, and had a good relationship with his employee, who were loyal to him. Consequently, the Revolutions of 1848 did not have an adverse impact on the Berndorf factory and there were strikes. In Essen, Therese Krupp sold the factory to Alfred, who retired from the factory in Berndorf, and Hermann relinquished his inheritance in Essen.

Though Alfred and Hermann had very different characteristics as siblings, they always had good relationship inside the family.

Hermann travelled to the Centennial Exposition in 1876 in Philadelphia, and visited several companies in the US. He wanted to gather new ideas and experiences regarding the production of nickel and cutlery. The journey damaged his health, and he handed over his company to his son, Arthur. He died in Berndorf, Lower Austria at the age of 65.

== Sources ==
- Franz Maria Feldhaus (1910). "Krupp, Hermann" . Allgemeine Deutsche Biographie (in German). Vol. 55. Leipzig: Duncker & Humblot. pp. 539–540.
- Rita Hanss, Karl-Heinz Daniel (photographer): "Das Erbe der 'Löffeltanndler'. Hermann und Arthur Krupp schrieben im niederösterreichischen Berndorf ein wichtiges Kapitel Bau- und Sozialgeschichte". In: Kultur & Technik, vol. 22 (1998), no. 3, ZDB-ID 161328-5, pp. 47–50.
- Hillbrand: "Krupp Hermann". In: Österreichisches Biographisches Lexikon 1815–1950 (ÖBL). Vol. 4, Austrian Academy of Sciences, Vienna 1969, p. 304 f. (Direct links to "p. 304", "p. 305")
- Hans Jaeger (1982). "Krupp, Hermann". Neue Deutsche Biographie (in German). Vol. 13. Berlin: Duncker & Humblot. pp. 145–146. (full text online).
- Dietmar Lautscham: Arthur, der österreichische Krupp. Kral, Berndorf 2005, ISBN 3-902447-12-5.
- Erwin Schilder: Berndorf – Vergangenheit und Gegenwart. Stadtgemeinde, Berndorf 1975, details at Österreichischer Bibliothekenverbund.
