= List of universities in Austria =

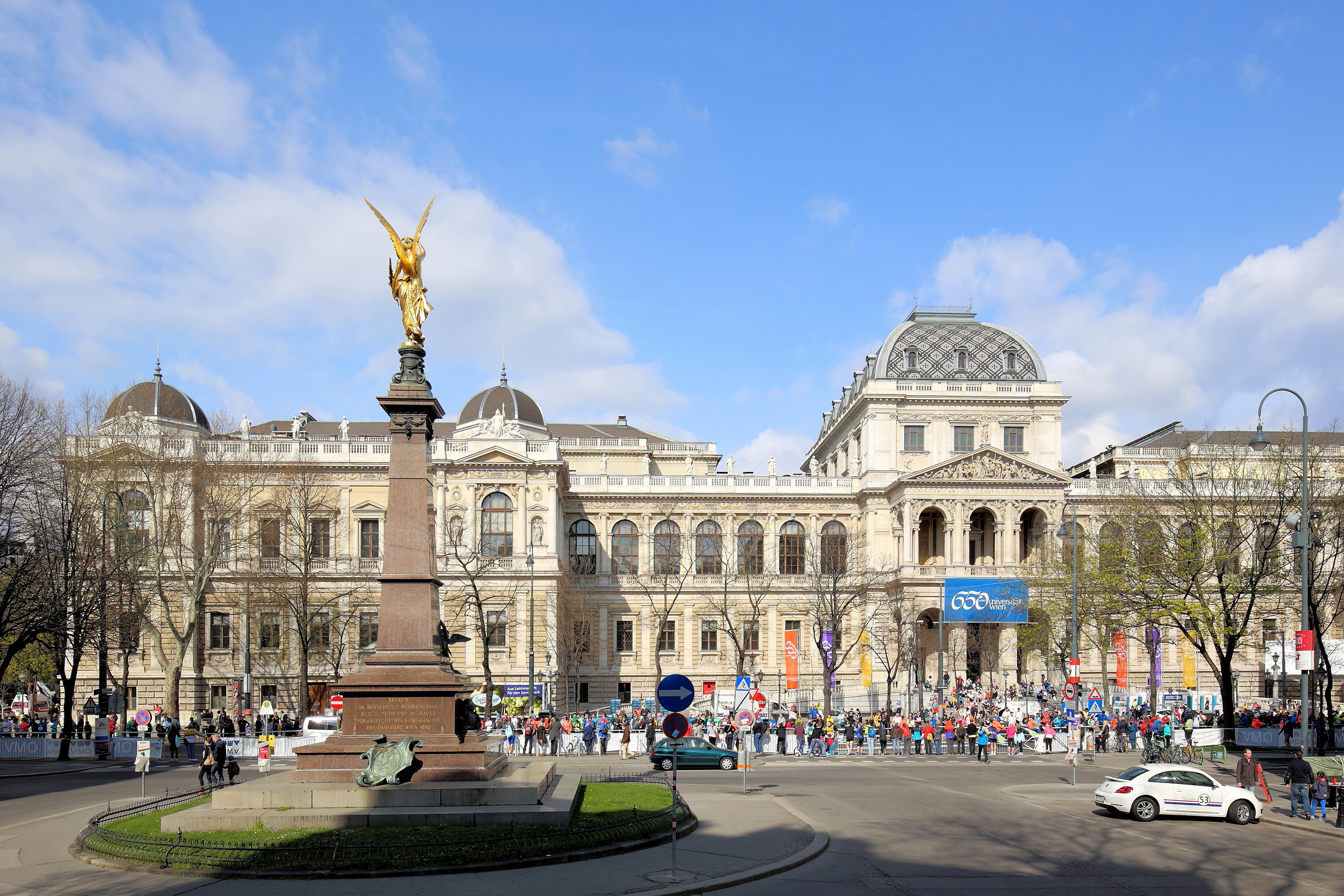
University of Vienna, Austria's oldest, biggest and most renowned university

The system on higher education in Austria distinguishes between federal universities (Universitäten), private universities (Privatuniversitäten), universities of applied science (Fachhochschulen) and University College of Teacher Education (Pädagogische Hochschulen). The four types are based on different laws. One of the main differences—but not the only one—is funding. Two institutions in Lower Austria have a special legal status. Since 2012, the Agentur für Qualitätssicherung und Akkreditierung Austria (AQ Austria) is responsible for the educational accreditation of universities.

== List of universities in Austria ==
University	City	State	Type	Founding date	Number of Students	THE Ranking Result	QS Ranking Result
Academy of Fine Arts Vienna	Vienna	Vienna	Federal university	1692	1,627	n/a	n/a
University of Applied Arts Vienna	Vienna	Vienna	Federal university	1867	2,031	n/a	n/a
Anton Bruckner Private University	Linz	Upper Austria	Private university	2004	895	n/a	n/a
Bertha von Suttner Private University	Sankt Pölten	Lower Austria	Private university	2018	354	n/a	n/a
University of Natural Resources and Life Sciences Vienna	Vienna	Vienna	Federal university	1872	10,102	n/a	n/a
Central European University	Vienna	Vienna	Private university	1991 / 2019	1900	251	239
Danube Private University	Krems an der Donau	Lower Austria	special status	2009	2,740	n/a	n/a
Institute of Science and Technology Austria	Klosterneuburg	Lower Austria	special status	2009	365	n/a	n/a
Gustav Mahler Private University of Music	Klagenfurt	Carinthia	Private university	2019	294	n/a	n/a
Jam Music Lab Private University	Vienna	Vienna	Private university	2011	219	n/a	n/a
Johannes Kepler University Linz	Linz	Upper Austria	Federal university	1966	24,569	401	458
Joseph-Haydn-Private University Burgenland	Eisenstadt	Burgenland	Private university	2023	220	n/a	n/a
Karl Landsteiner Private University of Health Sciences	Krems an der Donau	Lower Austria	Private university	2012	820	n/a	n/a
University of Graz	Graz	Styria	Federal university	1585	28,579	501	696
Catholic Private University Linz	Linz	Upper Austria	Private university	2000	271	n/a	n/a
University of Klagenfurt	Klagenfurt	Carinthia	Federal university	1970	12,862	601	683
University of Art and Design Linz	Linz	Upper Austria	Federal university	1973	1,595	n/a	n/a
University of Innsbruck	Innsbruck	Tyrol	Federal university	1669	27,576	301	333
Medical University of Graz	Graz	Styria	Federal university	2004	5,319	201	n/a
Medical University of Innsbruck	Innsbruck	Tyrol	Federal university	2004	3,823	201	n/a
Medical University of Vienna	Vienna	Vienna	Federal university	2004	8,583	181	n/a
Modul University Vienna	Vienna	Vienna	Private university	2007	653	n/a	n/a
University of Leoben	Leoben	Styria	Federal university	1840	2,882	801	851
Mozarteum University Salzburg	Salzburg	Salzburg	Federal university	1841	2,124	n/a	n/a
University of Music and Performing Arts Graz	Graz	Styria	Federal university	1970	2,189	n/a	n/a
University of Music and Performing Arts Vienna	Vienna	Vienna	Federal university	1819	2,999	n/a	n/a
Music and Arts University of the City of Vienna	Vienna	Vienna	Private university	2005	972	n/a	n/a
New Design University	Sankt Pölten	Lower Austria	Private university	2004	571	n/a	n/a
Paracelsus Medical University	Salzburg	Salzburg	Private university	2003	2,408	n/a	n/a
University of Salzburg	Salzburg	Salzburg	Federal university	1962	17,609	601	572
Seeburg Castle University	Seekirchen am Wallersee	Salzburg	Private university	2007	1,121	n/a	n/a
Sigmund Freud Private University	Vienna	Vienna	Private university	2005	6,285	n/a	n/a
Stella Vorarlberg Private College of Music	Feldkirch	Vorarlberg	Private university	2022	195	n/a	n/a
Graz University of Technology	Graz	Styria	Federal university	1811	17,032	601	409
Vienna University of Technology	Vienna	Vienna	Federal university	1815	25,743	301	191
UMIT Tirol - Private University for Health Sciences and Health Technology	Hall in Tirol	Tyrol	Private university	2001	1,335	n/a	n/a
University of Veterinary Medicine Vienna	Vienna	Vienna	Federal university	1765	2,542	n/a	n/a
Webster Vienna Private University	Vienna	Vienna	Private university	2001	514	n/a	n/a
University for Continuing Education Krems	Krems an der Donau	Lower Austria	Federal university	1994	8103	n/a	n/a
University of Sustainability - Charlotte Fresenius Private University	Vienna	Vienna	Private university	2022	57	n/a	n/a
University of Vienna	Vienna	Vienna	Federal university	1365	82,250	95	140
Vienna University of Economics and Business	Vienna	Vienna	Federal university	1898	21,807	n/a	n/a
Hochschule Burgenland	Eisenstadt	Burgenland	University of applied sciences	1994	2,472	n/a	n/a
Carinthia University of Applied Sciences	Spittal an der Drau	Carinthia	University of applied sciences	1995	2,649	n/a	n/a
Ferdinand Porsche Distance Learning University of Applied Sciences	Wiener Neustadt	Lower Austria	University of applied sciences	2006	909	n/a	n/a
IMC University of Applied Sciences Krems	Krems an der Donau	Lower Austria	University of applied sciences	1994	3,205	n/a	n/a
St, Pölten University of Applied Sciences	Sankt Pölten	Lower Austria	University of applied sciences	1994	2,878	n/a	n/a
University of Applied Military Sciences at the Theresian Military Academy	Wiener Neustadt	Lower Austria	University of applied sciences	(1751)	293	n/a	n/a
University of Applied Sciences Wiener Neustadt	Wiener Neustadt	Lower Austria	University of applied sciences	1994	4,373	n/a	n/a
University of Applied Sciences for Health Professions Upper Austria	Linz	Upper Austria	University of applied sciences	2010	1,499	n/a	n/a
University of Applied Sciences Upper Austria	Wels	Upper Austria	University of applied sciences	1994	5,827	n/a	n/a
University of Applied Sciences Salzburg	Puch bei Hallein	Salzburg	University of applied sciences	1995	3,370	n/a	n/a
Campus 02 University of Applied Sciences for Business	Graz	Styria	University of applied sciences	1996	1,441	n/a	n/a
FH Joanneum	Graz	Styria	University of applied sciences	1995	5,021	n/a	n/a
University of Applied Health Sciences Tyrol	Innsbruck	Tyrol	University of applied sciences	2007	1,144	n/a	n/a
University of Applied Sciences Kufstein	Kufstein	Tyrol	University of applied sciences	1997	1,842	n/a	n/a
Management Center Innsbruck	Innsbruck	Tyrol	University of applied sciences	1995	3,496	n/a	n/a
Vorarlberg University of Applied Sciences	Dornbirn	Vorarlberg	University of applied sciences	1989	1,594	n/a	n/a
University of Applied Sciences BFI Vienna	Vienna	Vienna	University of applied sciences	1996	2,211	n/a	n/a
University of Applied Sciences Campus Vienna	Vienna	Vienna	University of applied sciences	2001	6,756	n/a	n/a
Lauder Business School	Vienna	Vienna	University of applied sciences	2003	369	n/a	n/a
University of Applied Sciences Technikum Wien	Vienna	Vienna	University of applied sciences	1994	4,511	n/a	n/a
FHWien of WKW	Vienna	Vienna	University of applied sciences	1994	2,875	n/a	n/a
Private University of Education Burgenland	Eisenstadt	Burgenland	Private university college of teacher education	2007	816	n/a	n/a
University of Education Carinthia	Klagenfurt	Carinthia	Public university college of teacher education	2007	799	n/a	n/a
University of Education Lower Austria	Baden	Lower Austria	Public university college of teacher education	2007	1,718	n/a	n/a
Private University College of Education of the Diocese of Linz	Linz	Upper Austria	private university college of teacher education	1967	1,473	n/a	n/a
University of Education Upper Austria	Linz	Upper Austria	Public university college of teacher education	2007	2,394	n/a	n/a
University of Education Salzburg	Salzburg	Salzburg	Public university college of teacher education	1968 / 2007	1,085	n/a	n/a
Augustinum Private University of Education	Graz	Styria	private university college of teacher education	2007	812	n/a	n/a
University College of Teacher Education Styria	Graz	Styria	Public university college of teacher education	2007	2,803	n/a	n/a
Edith Stein University of Education	Innsbruck	Tyrol	private university college of teacher education	2007	390	n/a	n/a
University of Education Tyrol	Innsbruck	Tyrol	Public university college of teacher education	2007	1,287	n/a	n/a
University of Education Vorarlberg	Feldkirch	Vorarlberg	Public university college of teacher education	2007	561	n/a	n/a
University of Agricultural and Environmental Education	Vienna	Vienna	Public university college of teacher education	2007	828	n/a	n/a
University of Education Vienna	Vienna	Vienna	Public university college of teacher education	2007	4,047	n/a	n/a
University of Education Vienna/Lower Austria	Vienna	Vienna	private university college of teacher education	2007	2,567	n/a	n/a

== See also ==
- List of schools in Austria
- List of colleges and universities by country
- List of colleges and universities
- Open access in Austria
