= Libraries in Vienna =

- Büchereien Wien
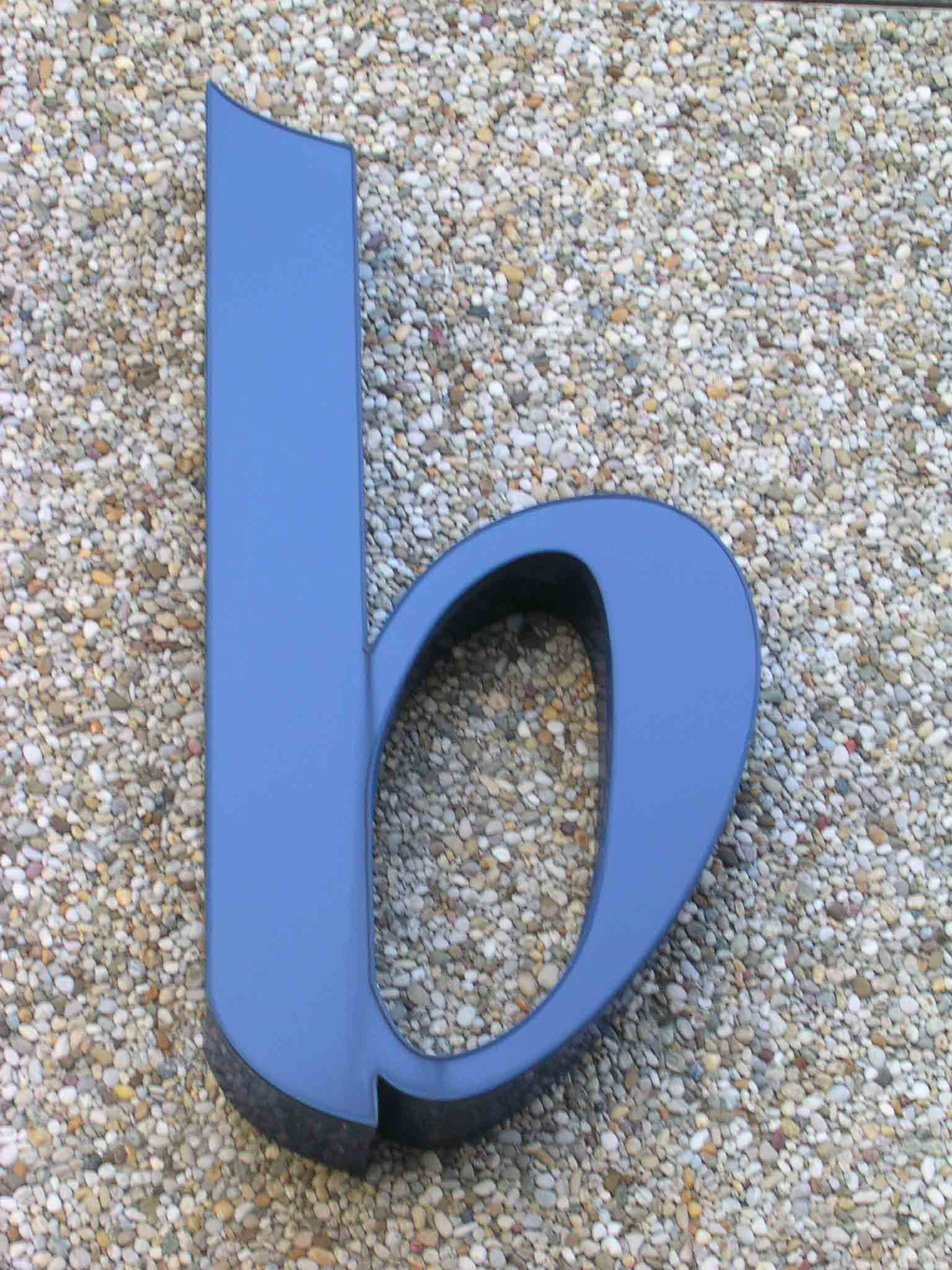
- Location: Vienna
- Type: City library
- Established: 1936
- Reference to legal mandate: The city of Vienna

Collection
- Items collected: 1.5 millionen pieces of media, 1.2 million of which are books As of: 2013

Other information
- Director: Bernhard Pöckl
- Website: Büchereien Wien

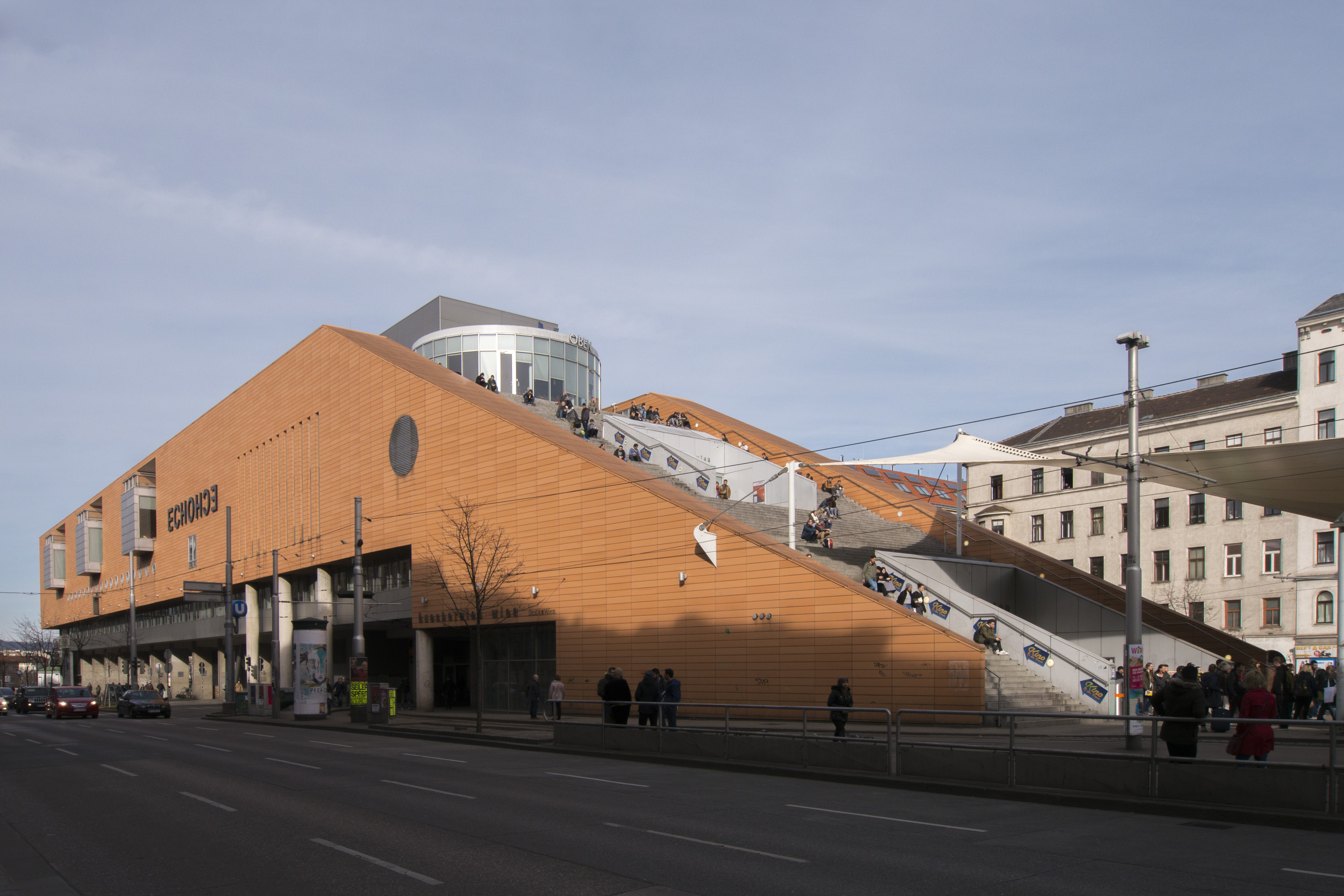
The main library, opened in 2003, above the subway-station Burggasse-Stadthalle at the "Gürtel"

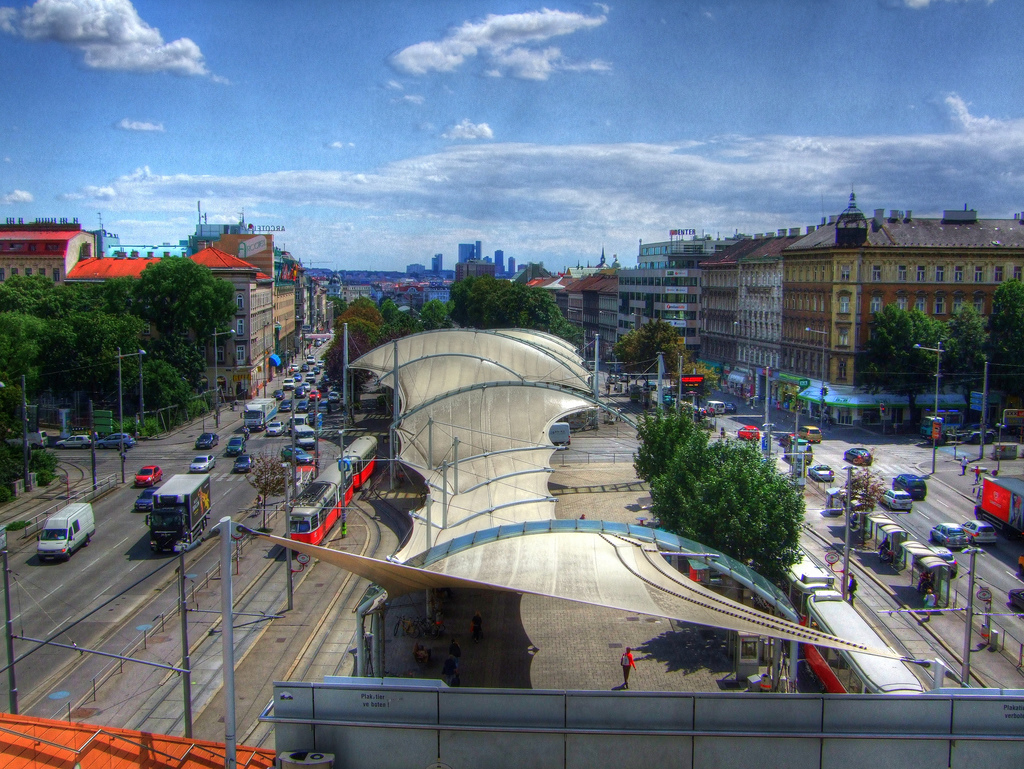
View on the "Urban-Loritz-Platz" from the rooftop of the main library

The Libraries in Vienna are a network of libraries which are managed by the city of Vienna. They are mainly concerned with enabling broad public education, whilst the also city owns Wienbibliothek im Rathaus (Library of Vienna in the city hall), which focuses on scientific work.

Beside the main library at the "Neubaugürtel", the Libraries in Vienna maintain 38 branching libraries in almost all districts of Vienna. The "mobile libraries", which were established in 1958 and took on the form of so-called "Bookbuses", visiting designated places in Vienna (for example schools), were closed down in 2009.

== What the Libraries Offer ==
Over 1.7 million media are available in the Libraries in Vienna, which fall in the jurisdiction of the municipal department 13 (education and extra-curricular youth services). Alongside books that offer a selection of all themes, from non-fiction books about advice, children's books, fiction, to viennese literature, the Libraries in Vienna also offer Audio CDs (classic, jazz, folk, rock and pop), CD-ROMs, DVDs, computer games, and audio- and video-cassettes. The media are in open-access and freely available, and can either be borrowed or used on the spot. In many instances there are "reading corners" for Migrants with books from the respective homelands. Each branch has at least one computer for catalogue- and internet research. In 2004 the "Libraries in Vienna" recorded 5,265 million loans from 129,125 readers.

Since 30 September 2010, numerous digital media can be loaned via download from the "Virtual Library of Vienna" at all times. These media can be downloaded and used on a computer or other devices such as E-Book-Readers or MP3-Players. In order to be able to borrow eMedia, a valid library card from the Libraries in Vienna and a computer with an internet connection is needed. The "return" happens automatically, after the expiration of the loan duration the eMedia can no longer be opened and is available to other users again instantly. Therefore, no overdue fines can be accrued.

== Main Libraries and other Branches ==
Branches 2021
Name	District	Existing- media
Engerthstraße Library	2.	31,000
Zirkusgasse Library	2.	47,000
Erdbergstraße Library	3.	46,800
Rabenhof Library	3.	17,500
Fasanviertel Library	3.	16,900
Wieden Library	4.	34,300
Margareten Library	5.	29,000
Mariahilf Library	6.	30,000
Main Library	7.	406,700
Alsergrund Library	9.	13,500
Per-Albin-Hansson-Siedlung Library	10.	16,700
Laxenburger Straße Library	10.	30,700
Hasengasse Library	10.	12,400
Library in the Simmering Education Centre	11.	45,800
Leberberg Library	11.	23,500
am Schöpfwerk Library	12.	21,800
Philadelphiabrücke Library	12.	64,700
Hietzing Library	13.	34,200
Breitnerhof Library	14.	18,800
Penzing Library	14.	33,500
Am Meiselmarkt Library	15.	16,700
Schwendermarkt Library	15.	28,300
Sandleiten Library	16.	21,700
Ottakring Library	16.	19,800
Hernals Library	17.	41,200
Weimarer Straße Library	18.	26,700
Heiligenstadt Library	19.	21,700
Billrothstraße Library	19.	40,600
Pappenheimgasse Library	20.	33,100
Leystraße Library	20.	17,200
Schlingerhof Library	21.	38,200
Großjedlersdorf Library	21.	31,600
Großfeldsiedlung Library	21.	17,000
Seestadt Aspern Library	22.	22,500
Kaisermühlen Library	22.	12,900
Donaustadt Library	22.	38,000
Liesing Library	23.	41,500
Alt-Erlaa Library	23.	29,100

In the year 2003, the main library of the House of Books moved from the Josefstädter Skodagasse, (where the centre of the Music schools of Vienna now lies) to the Neubaugürtel, a part of the Gürtel, Vienna. Between both roadways of the belt and over the Burggasse-Stadthalle station, the building, designed by architect Ernst Mayr in the form of a 150-metre-long abstracted ship, was built in district 7 (address: Urban-Loritz-Platz 2a). At the main entry of the library, one can walk over the biggest staircase of Vienna, which stylistically lends from the Casa Malaparte This leads to the roof, where the Café Oben is. The facade is executed in the Terracotta style.

240,000 books and 60,000 audiovisual medias like magazines and newspapers can be seen across two levels. There is also an area called Kirangon for children. There are 130 computer workplaces for catalogue and internet research, as well as 40 audio and video places.

The main library has used the BiblioChip system RFID for contactless media-accounting and security since 2002. With this, the customers of the library can use their own scanning device to loan something themselves. The manager of the main library used to be Christian Jahl and as of 2022 is now Bernhard Pöckl.

== Lesofant Festival and Free Book Campaign ==
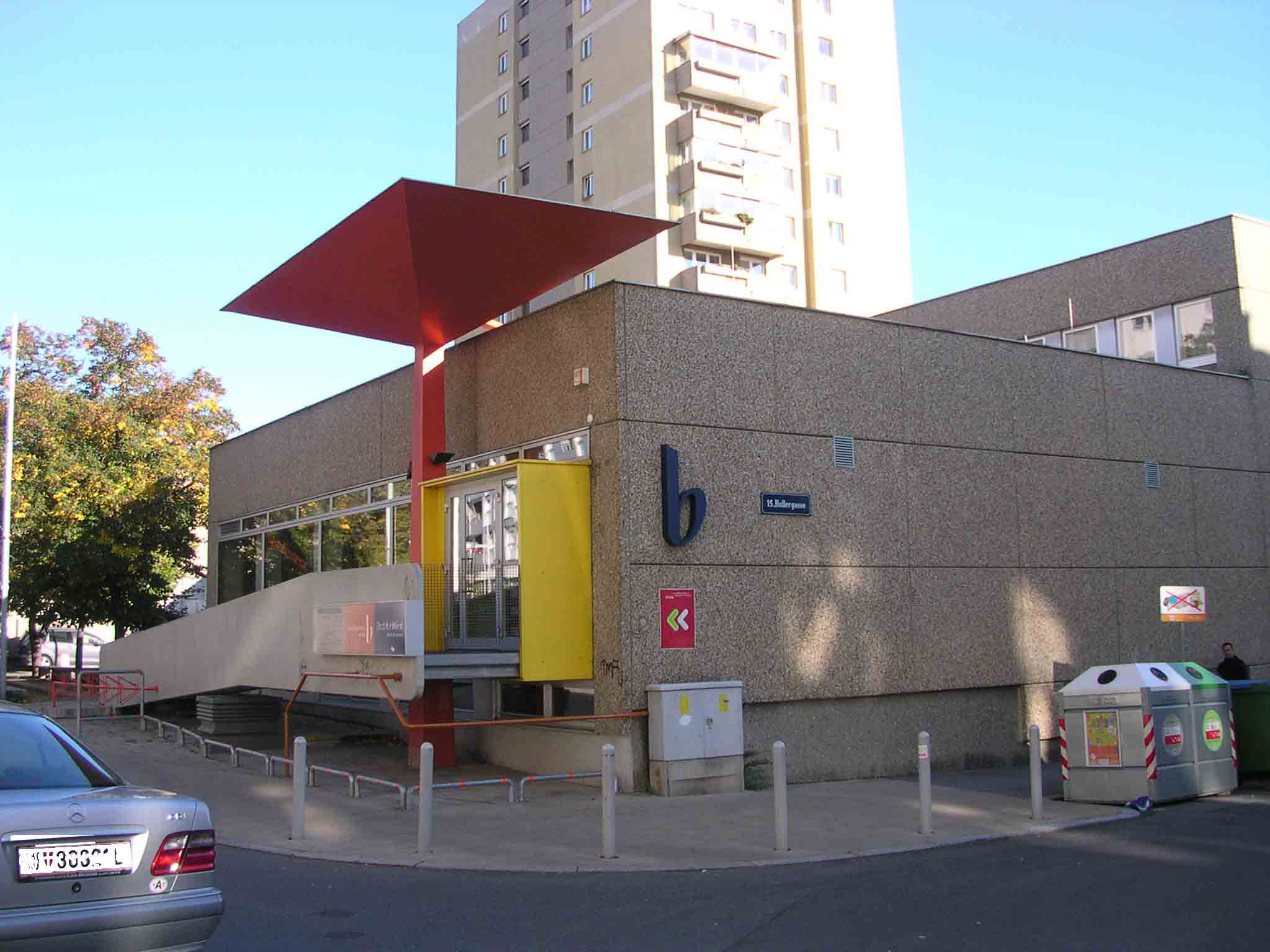
Schwendermarkt branch

The "Lesofant" festival ("Lesofant" is the reading mascot of the Libraries in Vienna and all public libraries in Austria) is a yearly cultural event for children in the city of Vienna, that takes place each November in the Libraries in Vienna. It runs for at least two weeks, offers approximately 60 events and has about 10,000 visitors. The programme consists of readings, music, storytelling and children's theatre, dance performances, clown and puppet shows, object theatre, and a special adventure night - called "Bücherdschungel" (the book jungle) - in Dschungel Wien (children and young persons' theatre) in the Museumsquartier. The supporting programme includes 400 supervised games from the Vienna Spielebox (toy library), children's Kurier newspaper workshop, other workshops and activities. The dedicated calendar of events "Lesofantino" offers programmes for all children up to 4 years old. The Libraries in Vienna also support the free book campaign of Vienna: "Eine STADT. Ein BUCH." (One city. One book.)

Development of Employment Figures
Year	Employees
1945	78
1950	133
1955	126
1960	149
1965	162
1970	162
1975	175
1980	183
1985	206
1990	214
1992	220
source: in the text.

== Personnel ==
The number of staff increased continuously from 1945 until 1992. In 1945, 78 people were employed, and by a year later the number rose to 122. In 1992 there were 220 employees, which was the highest number of staff up until that point. A large percentage of these were employed in the main library. Small teams of often only 5 people worked in the smaller branches. In 1945 around 63% of employees were women, in 1964 only around 56%, and in 1992 once again 64%.

== History ==
=== Early history: Public Libraries in Vienna until 1936 ===
While the large cities of England, Scandinavia and Germany had started to establish public libraries from around 1900, the Worker's Library of Vienna was not founded until 1936. In this year the city of Vienna adopted the already existing public libraries as organising institutions, which were run by private organisations until then.

These public libraries were for instance built by the Wiener Volksbildungsverein (Viennese association for public education) which was founded in 1887. By 1914 they had already established 27 branches (e.g. a library in the adult education centre Volksheim Ottakring) with over 2 million annual borrowings. The Verein Zentralbibliothek (Central Library Association) which was founded by Eduard Reyer in 1897 was also of importance. It ran the central library and 24 branches with overall 3.5 million annual borrowings in 1911, charged fees and was staffed by paid librarians. Those two library organisations which, according to themselves, made an effort to provide "neutral" public education and enlightenment were opposed by organisations who represented a religious ideology. To do so, Ignaz Stich founded the Volkslesehalle (people's library) in 1899. Additionally, the Katholischer Bibliotheks- und Leseverein (Catholic Association for Libraries and Reading) was founded in 1909. The most important part of the Libraries in Vienna before the founding of the public libraries was the network of libraries built by the viennese Labour movement. At first it was their education organisations who sought to provide books and libraries to the masses and later on were assisted by unions and political parties. In 1908 the Zentralstelle für das Bildungswesen (Centre for Education) was founded, with Robert Danneberg as secretary. Numerous libraries with quality standards and standard guidelines were established, as well as a library committee with Josef Luitpold Stern at its head. Many of these libraries were residing in the Gemeindebau-buildings which were built during the Red Vienna period. There were 2,36 loans in the workers libraries in 1932.

=== Founding in 1936 ===
The takeover of the Austrofaschisten signalled the end of the social democratic establishment, and the Association of Workers' Libraries with Karl Lugmayer as chairman took over the libraries that were seized. There were increasing attempts inside the Association of Workers' Libraries to resist the corporate state with legal cultural work, but these were stifled in 1936 with the decision to pass a new viennese public education law. The city took over the Association of Workers' Libraries and put it under the control of the municipal collections as a communal service. The censorship of books began in 1934 and has even now been increased again and a total of 1,500 titles have been indexed.

=== National Socialism Period and the Post-war Period ===
In 1938, the Association of Worker Libraries was renamed the Municipal Libraries. After the seizure of power by the Nationalsozialisten more works were discarded from the inventory, this time books by Jewish authors. After the Novemberpogrom 1938 Jews were banned from using the libraries. The librarians however stayed largely the same, since Left-wing politics and Jews had already been banned a since 1934. The leader became National Socialist Hans Ruppe, student of the library theorist Walter Hofmann and active for years in the library system of the Third Reich. Ruppe focused on controlling and regulating reading behaviour, and towards this he somewhat reduced fiction Belles-lettres works and strengthened the stock of non-fiction books that aligned with the National Socialist worldview. Until December 1941 a reader could only take out one book per visit. The number of readers rapidly decreased, while the professionalisation of librarians on the other hand increased. Fixed posts were set up in place of the expense allowances that had previously existed, and the librarians had to complete training at one of the German public library schools.

After the end of the war the rebuilding of the Municipal Libraries began. From the former Worker's Libraries only a third still remained (of the 23 branches that existed in 1945) and the inventory of books had been decimated due to the cleansing done by the "Austrian fascist" and the National Socialist works. The social democrats decided against giving back the Worker's Libraries, so the Municipal Libraries were able to be integrated into the new city's administration. They were managed by the cultural office until 1979 and the primary goals of the post-war period were above all to procure books and restore the branches.

=== Since 1950 ===
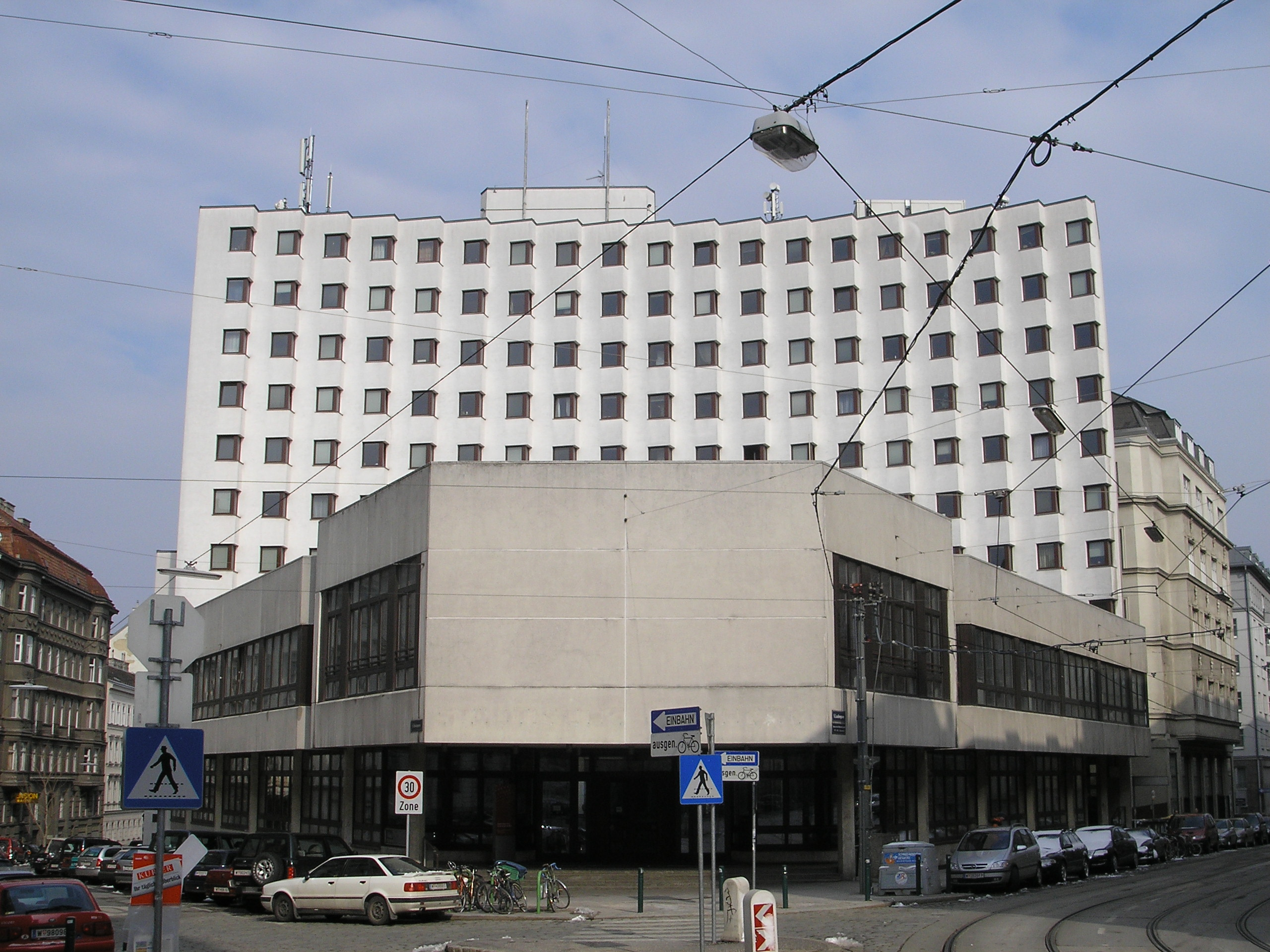
The "Haus des Buches" was from 1970 until 2003 the main library of the Libraries in Vienna, today the head office of the music schools of the city of Vienna is located here.

Since the 1950s libraries were constructed in newly built community buildings (later also in People's Houses as well as Meeting Houses) and were provided with a department for children and young people. Soon, the capacity for library branches was reached, and as a result a main library (with affiliated music libraries) was built for the first time in 1970. Under the director Rudolf Müller (1950–1970), writers were employed as librarians. This was so that literature could be promoted in a practical way, in which they were able to support their literary work with a regular job. Among them were Christine Busta, Rudolf Felmayer, Gerhard Fritsch, Walter Buchebner, Franz Hiesel, Wilhelm Meissel and Herbert Wadsack. Only later would the so-called "over-the-counter" borrowing system be removed, whereby users had to order their books at a counter and couldn't choose personally from accessible shelves. It was followed by the "freehand" set-up, which still exists today, in which the reader is allowed to look through the books. Since the end of the 1950s until 2009 a Bookmobile supplied certain areas with books, such as those which were in the outskirts or didn't have their own branch. Until 2003, the municipal libraries also operated apprentice libraries in vocational schools and hospital libraries. Since 1982, a home visit service has been providing books to the disabled.

The business group division of the viennese magistrate was reformed in 1979 and the city libraries were outsourced and assigned to the newly formed municipal department 13 of education and extra-curricular youth services. Under the leadership of Franz Pascher (1976 until 1998), electronic data processing was established and under Alfred Pfoser (1998 until 2007), an online library catalogue was installed. Due to a shortage of storage for book stocks, a new building for the main library was constructed at the Urban Loritz-Square in 2003. Elke Bazalka, as head of economy, and Markus Feigl, as head librarian, took over the leadership over the Libraries in Vienna. Since 2010, digital media (E-books, E-audios and E-paper) were also offered online in form of downloads. Around 17,200 such pieces of digital media were part of the libraries' repertoire by the end of 2012, and there were around 155,000 loans of digital media in the same year. Media Vienna (former state picture office) has been part of the Libraries in Vienna since 2011 and offers numerous pieces of media to be borrowed, including movies, theme boxes and CD-ROMs. In 2012, 1.524 million pieces of media, 39 branching libraries, 5.7 million borrowings and 210,937 users were counted. Feigl changed positions to the library association of Austria and Elke Bazalka become sole head of the libraries from 2016.

On the 11 June 2019, the Libraries in Vienna realised that they had been the target of a hacker attack. Data of 713,000 users was copied from a database that partly contained personal data. These pieces of information were then made public online.

Christian Jahl, who was the head of the main library at the "Gürtel" until that point, took over leadership of the Libraries in Vienna in August 2020.

A new library branch was opened in the seaside town Aspern in September 2021. However, in exchange for this new library, two smaller ones at the "Siegesplatz" and in the "Erzherzog-Karl-Straße" of the 22nd district were closed down.

In February 2022, Bernhard Pöckl (born 1981) replaced his predecessor Christian Jahl as the head of the Libraries in Vienna.

== See also ==
- List of libraries in Austria

== Literature ==
- Alfred Pfoser: Die Wiener Städtischen Büchereien. Zur Bibliothekskultur in Österreich, WUV Universitätsverlag, Wien 1994, ISBN 3-85114-153-9

History

- Martin Bartenberger, Christoph Wendler: Nationalsozialistische Büchereipolitik in Wien. Städtische Büchereien und Verein Zentralbibliothek im Vergleich. In: Spurensuche. Zeitschrift für Geschichte der Erwachsenenbildung und Wissenschaftspopularisierung, 20./21. Jg., Heft 1–4, Wien 2012, P. 335ff.
- Herbert Exenberger: Die Arbeiterbüchereien der Stadt Wien nach dem März 1938. In: Felix Czeike (Hrsg.): Wien 1938, Wien 1978, P. 237ff. (= Forschungen und Beiträge zur Wiener Stadtgeschichte, Band 2)
- Herbert Exenberger: Die Wiener Arbeiterbüchereien. Ihre Geschichte und ihre kulturellen Leistungen im Dienste der Wiener Volksbildung, Vienna 1968
- Heimo Gruber: Bücher aus dem Schutt. Die Wiener Städtischen Büchereien 1945–1950, Wien 1987
- Alfred Pfoser: Die Leipziger Radikalkur. Die Wiener Städtischen Büchereien im Nationalsozialismus. In: Peter Vodosek, Manfred Komorowski (Hrsg.): Bibliotheken während des Nationalsozialismus, Part 2, Wiesbaden 1992, P. 91ff.
- Alfred Pfoser: Die Wiener Städtischen Büchereien im Nationalsozialismus. In: Peter Vodosek, Manfred Komorowski (Hrsg.): Bibliotheken während des Nationalsozialismus, Part 1, Wiesbaden 1989, P. 273ff.
- Karin Steinlechner: Abschnürung und Weltoffenheit. Der Aufbau des Buchbestandes der Wiener Städtischen Büchereien nach 1945. In: Alfred Pfoser, Peter Vodosek (Hrsg.): Zur Geschichte der Öffentlichen Bibliotheken in Österreich, Vienna 1995, P. 118ff.

Architecture

- Ernst Mayr u. a.: Die Hauptbücherei Wien. The Main City Library Vienna, Springer, Vienna/New York 2005 ISBN 978-3-211-23353-5

Technical

- Bernhard Wenzl: RFID in der Hauptbücherei In: Eveline Pipp (Hrsg.): Informationskonzepte für die Zukunft : ODOK '07, Graz-Feldkirch 2008, pp. 157–165, ISBN 978-3-85376-285-1.
