= Liechtenstein State Library =

Legal deposit and copyright library for Liechtenstein

Coordinates: 47.1358°N 9.5208°E

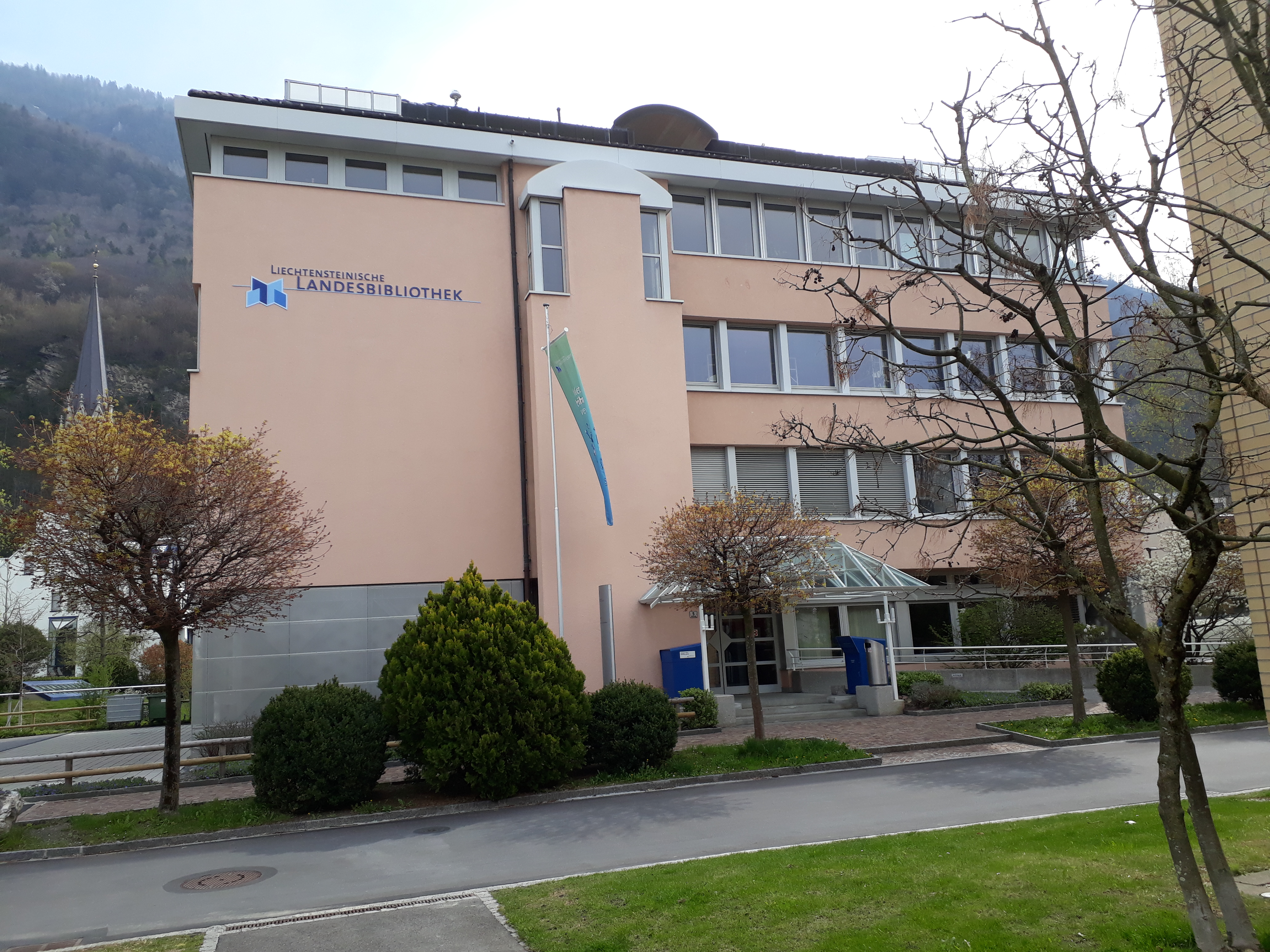
Liechtenstein State Library

The Liechtenstein State Library (German: Liechtensteinische Landesbibliothek, pronounced [ˌlɪçtn̩ʃtaɪnɪʃə ˈlandəsbiblioˌteːk]) is the legal deposit and copyright library for Liechtenstein. It was established by law in 1961 by the National Library Foundation.

== Legal basis and tasks ==
The Liechtenstein State Library, locally known as the State Library, was established by law in 1961 by the National Library Foundation. The State Library possesses a legal depository. Aside from forming the library itself, the National Library Foundation also provides librarians’ commissions. The governing board members are appointed by the national government, which also acts as the supervisory body of the Foundation.

As a national library, the State Library collects print materials, pictures and music created by national citizens, as well as items related to Liechtenstein. The State Library also acts as a patent library for Liechtenstein and as such provides access to comprehensive international patent information. The State Library's rules and regulations must follow the current legislation under Liechtenstein's European Economic Area as well as Swiss legislation.

== Library inventory ==
As of 2024, the State Library contained almost 230,000 items, with a little over 180,000 loans yearly. There were around 45,000 library users, and 51,000 recorded library visits, averaging 4.1 loans per person per year.

In 1999, the State Library's online library system joined with Ex Libris’ Aleph 500. This automated tracking system provided the library catalogues for every public library in and outside of the Liechtenstein region. This system was replaced after 25 years of usage by NetBiblio in 2024.

The State Library is an associate member of the Information Network of German Switzerland.

In 2010 the State Library mounted Project eLiechtensteinesia, which provides online access to scans of the Yearbook of the Historical Society for the Principality of Liechtenstein, old national newspapers, and other publications from Liechtenstein.

== See also ==
- List of libraries in Austria
- List of libraries in Germany
