= Kolonie =

Human settlement in Baden District, Austria

Coordinates: 47°55′36″N 16°05′45″E

Kolonie is a settlement in the municipality of Berndorf in the Baden District of Lower Austria.

The settlement, a former miners' settlement, is located south of Berndorf on the L4020. It was built in 1919 as a residential area for the miners of the Grillenberg lignite mining in the local style.
