= Berndorf, Lower Austria =

Berndorf
- Municipality
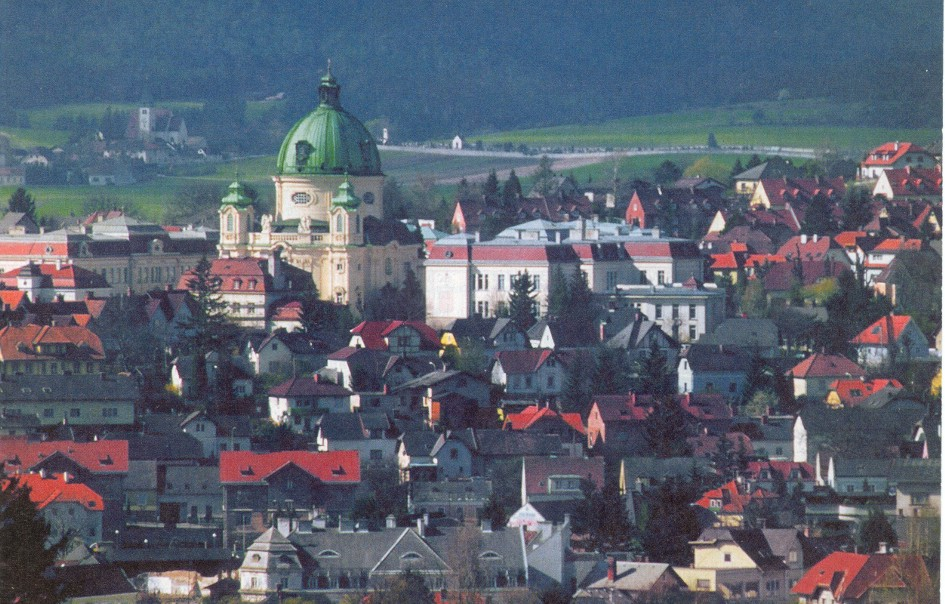
- General view of the town

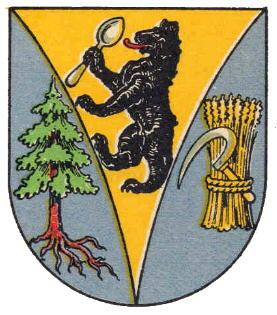
- Coat of arms

- Location within Austria
- Coordinates: 47°56′34″N 16°6′13″E
- Country: Austria
- State: Lower Austria
- District: Baden

Government
  - Mayor: Franz Rumpler (ÖVP)

Area
  - Total: 17.58 km^{2} (6.79 sq mi)
- Elevation: 314 m (1,030 ft)

Population (2018-01-01)
  - Total: 9,064
  - Density: 515.6/km^{2} (1,335/sq mi)
- Time zone: UTC+1 (CET)
  - Summer (DST): UTC+2 (CEST)
- Postal code: 2560
- Area code: 02672
- Website: www.berndorf-stadt.at

Berndorf is a town in the district of Baden in Lower Austria in Austria. Because of its historic development in the 19th century it is also referred to as the Krupp town.

== Districts ==
The town consists of 4 districts:

- Berndorf-Stadt
- St. Veit
- Ödlitz
- Veitsau / Steinhof

== Settlements ==
- Kolonie

== History ==
Artefacts from various epoques of the Stone Age prove that there was a settlement in this region.

Perindorf is likely to have its name from a man named Pero, who settled here in 1070. The name Perendorf was first mentioned in 1133.

Throughout the following centuries, Berndorf was ravaged by the Magyars and the Ottomans.

In the 18th century, metal-working companies such as Neuhirtenberger Kupferhammer, which used the first steam engine in all of Lower Austria in 1836, settled in this region. Before that, hydropower coming from the Triesting was the main energy source.

In the 19th century the majority of the inhabitants of Berndorf and its neighbouring villages worked in the metal industry. In 1844, Berndorf consisted of no more than 50 houses with about 180 inhabitants, when the cutlery factory of Alexander Schoeller and Hermann Krupp was founded. Initially, there were 50 workers, but throughout the years, the company developed and turned into a multi-national combine with over 6,000 employees. The development of the city of Berndorf was closely related to the history of the Krupp family. Arthur Krupp, son of Hermann Krupp, founded a private elementary school and a public swimming pool, as well as the neo-baroque St. Margaret's church.

In 1923, the communities of Berndorf, St. Veit, Ödlitz and Veitsau were united and formed the city of Berndorf.

After the Anschluss in 1938, the Arthur Krupp company became a part of the German Krupp combine. Because of its industrial importance, Berndorf was also an important target of air attacks. During World War II, Berndorf was not even spared the forces of nature. The floods in 1939 and 1944 were the most destructive floods in the history of the Triesting river.

When the war had ended, the metal company was confiscated by the Soviet Army and incorporated into the USIA. In 1957, it was given back to the State of Austria and merged with the Vereinigte Aluminiumwerke Ranshofen (VAW).

Because of financial problems of the socialised industries in the 1980s, the Berndorf consortium was spun off and passed into private hands.

== Population ==
Historical population
Year	Pop.	±%
1869	3,331	—
1880	4,172	+25.2%
1890	6,776	+62.4%
1900	9,117	+34.5%
1910	12,788	+40.3%
1923	12,604	−1.4%
1934	10,949	−13.1%
1939	10,959	+0.1%
1951	9,541	−12.9%
1961	8,992	−5.8%
1971	8,690	−3.4%
1981	8,690	+0.0%
1991	8,264	−4.9%
2001	8,642	+4.6%
2011	8,763	+1.4%

== Culture ==
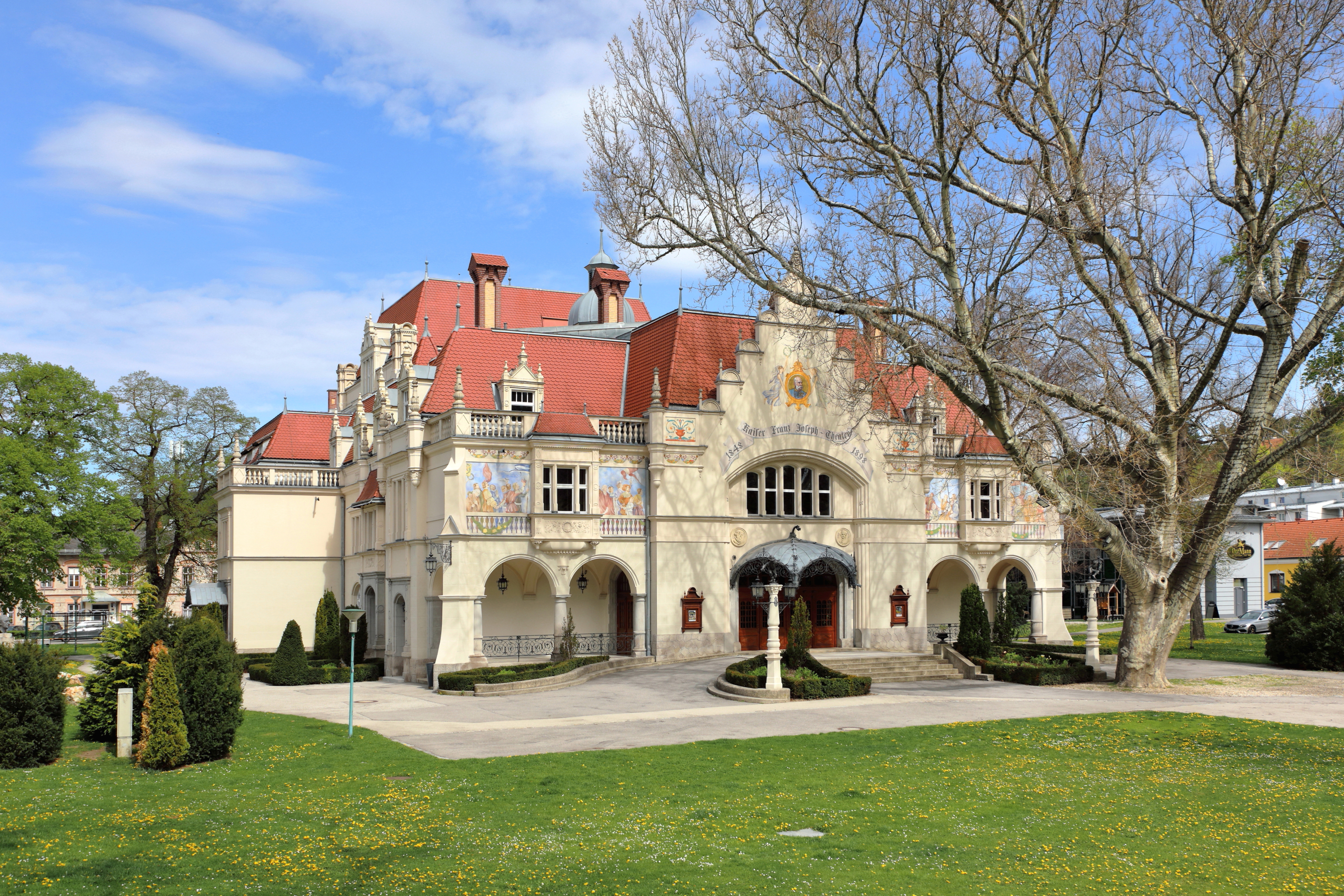
Berndorf city theater

=== Theatre ===
The annual theatre festival takes place in the municipal theatre of Berndorf every summer.

=== Sights ===
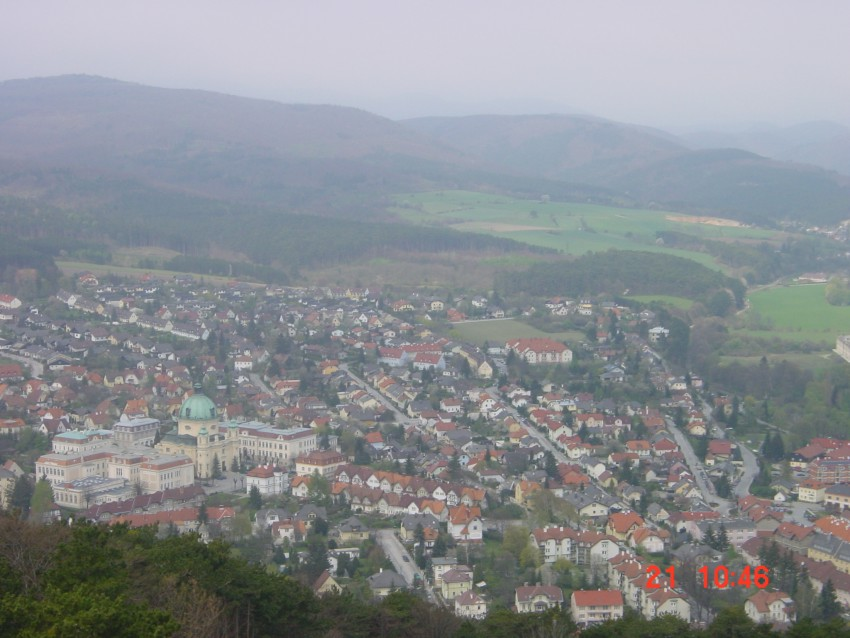
Berndorf from Guglzipf

- Municipal Theatre of Berndorf
- Krupp schools
- Guglzipf with its look-out
- Krupp Stadt Museum
- The iron bear
- St. Margaret's Church
- St. Mary's Church

== Twin cities ==
- Ōhasama (Japan, now a part of Hanamaki)
- Sigmundsherberg
