= Stilklassen =

Coordinates: 47°56′34″N 16°06′08″E

The Stilklassen (German, lit. "style classes") are located in two schools in Berndorf, Lower Austria.

== History ==
After a two-year construction phase, the schools were opened in 1909. What is special about these schools is their furnishing, which was funded by Arthur Krupp. The architect of these unique buildings is Ludwig Baumann. Each of the classrooms is furnished and designed in a different historical style. Krupp's aim was to teach his workers' children the knowledge about foreign cultures that he was able to obtain on his journeys.

== The Classrooms ==
- the Egyptian classroom: The entrance to this classroom is a replica of the burial chamber in Eimisi. The ceiling and the walls display typical Egyptian images.
- the Doric classroom: The bronze portal is a copy of the door of the tower of Mykena.
- the Moorish classroom: The door is a replica of the Porta aurea in Córdoba. The original pillars can be found at the Alhambra, whereas the motives on the ceiling are a faithful reproduction of the ceiling in the church Alkalda de Heinares.
- the Pompeian classroom
- the Byzantine classroom with motives from St. Sergius' church in Constantinople
- the Gothic classroom, which displays motives of the churches in Steinakirchen am Forst, Lower Austria and Ptuj, Slovenia
- the Roman classroom by the example of the church of castle Třebíč, Czech Republic
- the Roman Renaissance classroom with a replica of the ceiling of the Palazzo Massimo in Rome
- the Baroque classroom with its reproduction of the entrance of Vienna's Belvedere palace
- the classroom built in the style of Louis XIV
- the Rococo classroom
- the Empire classroom, built after motives in Palais Modena, Vienna
- Ilg, Christine: Berndorf und seine Schulen - ein Streifzug durch Berndorf, ISBN 3-925011-00-5
