= Europagymnasium Auhof =

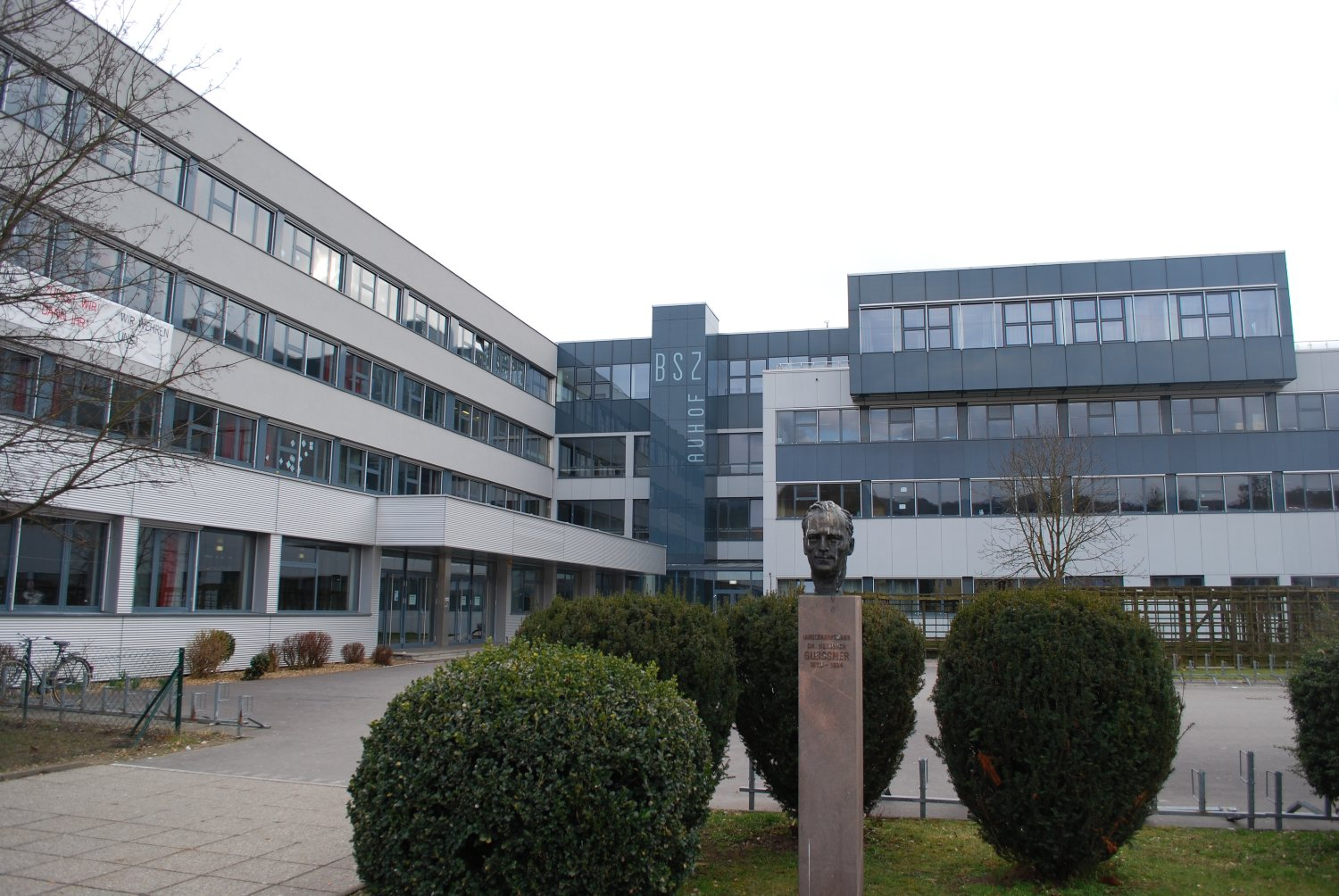

Location
- Aubrunnerweg 4 Linz, Upper Austria, 4040; Austria; 48°20′02″N 14°19′14″E

Information
- Type: Public, co-educational
- Established: 1977/78
- School number: 401546
- Administrator: Franz Weißhäupl; Alexander Hartl
- Headmaster: Mag. Andrea Obermayr-Rauter
- Employees: 155
- Age range: 10-18
- Enrolment: c. 1256
- Language: German
- Colours: Red and white
- Website: www.europagym.at

Europagymnasium Auhof is a public school for the grades 5 to 12, preparing Students for University, located in Linz, Upper Austria. It has three branches, a science branch (KEPLER), a French branch (ELLA) and an English taught branch (LISA). The Administration of the Europagymnasium Auhof consists of the Headmistress Mag. Andrea Obermayr-Rauter and the two Administrators Alexander Hartl and Franz Weißhäupl. An estimated amount of 1256 students are taught by 155 Teachers.

== Branches ==
=== KEPLER ===
The Kepler branch serves as the school's STEM (MINT) branch, focusing on the sciences, mathematics, geometry and chemistry. Unlike the bilingual English-speaking LISA branch the Kepler curriculum introduces physics and a "Naturwissenschaftliches Praktikum", which can be translated to a "Natural Sciences Program" in the 2nd grade. The branch's name originates from the renowned astronomer and mathematician Johannes Kepler.

=== LISA ===
The LISA branch serves as the school's international branch with connections to Japan and Turkey. Except for German language classes, classes are taught exclusively in English. The LISA branch offers the International Baccalaureate (IB) Diploma and the Austrian Matura, while students who choose German as their primary language may pursue the IB in year 6 and the Matura in year 7 together. However students who have not chosen German as their primary language are ineligible for the Matura. Its name is derived from the abbreviation of "Linz International School Auhof". Along with the ELLA branch the LISA branch offers mandatory drama classes.

=== ELLA ===
The ELLA branch serves as the school's bilingual french branch. The curriculum includes mandatory french classes and french examinations. Alongside the LISA branch, the ELLA branch offers drama classes in second and third grade, which are mandatory as well. Additionally the ELLA branch offers classes called "Soziales Lernen"("Social Learning").

== History ==
The school was formally founded as an independent school in 1977. In 1992 the international LISA branch was founded, which has celebrated its 30th Anniversary in 2022.

== Notable Alumni ==
- Alexander Falk (1967), Graduated 1985, Buisnessman
- Matthias Troyer (1968), Graduated 1986, Physicist
- Peter-Arthur Straubinger (1970), Graduated 1988, Filmmaker and Journalist
- Berni Wagner (1991), Graduated 2009, Comedian
