= International Christian School of Vienna =

Coordinates: 48.2584°N 16.4494°E

- Vienna; Austria

Information
- Former name: Vienna Christian School
- Type: Private
- Religious affiliation: Evangelical Christian
- Established: 1986
- Director: Siebert J. Myburgh, M.Ed.
- Enrollment: 330
- Colors: Blue, Gold
- Athletics: Soccer (MS/HS), Basketball (MS/HS), Volleyball (MS/HS), Track (Secondary combined)
- Athletics conference: Danube Valley Athletic Conference
- Mascot: Eagle
- Website: www.icsv.at

The International Christian School of Vienna is an international school in Vienna, Austria that was founded in 1986. The school is located in the Donaustadt district of Vienna.

ICSV is a non-profit organization. It has a multicultural background, and it contains a large variety of students. The school currently enrolls approximately 320 students K-12, from more than 60 countries. It teaches Christian ethics and its curriculum is Americanized.

== History ==
Vienna Christian School was founded in 1986 by missionaries coming to Vienna to witness to those in the then-Soviet Union. At that time, VCS was focused directly on educating the missionary community. In 1991, when the borders opened, most of the missionary community moved on into the Eastern Bloc countries. Due to the lack of attendance, VCS opened its doors to the international community. When VCS was founded, the school campus was in the Heiligenstadt vicinity, but in 2001, the school moved to its current location in Donaustadt. In 2010, Vienna Christian School changed its name to the International Christian School of Vienna to embrace the international community. ICSV's 25th anniversary was in 2012. In 2015, ICSV became an IB World School, offering the Diploma Programme to 11th and 12th graders.
