= Seeburg Castle University =

Private university in Austria

- Privatuniversität Schloss Seeburg
- Type: Private university
- Established: 2007
- Location: Seekirchen am Wallersee, Austria
- Website: http://www.uni-seeburg.at/de/

The Seeburg Castle University (German: Privatuniversität Schloss Seeburg) was established by the Austrian Accreditation Council under the name to Private University of Economics' as a private university on 22 November 2007. It is headquartered in Schloss Seeburg in Seekirchen am Wallersee. In February 2008, the name was changed to Seeburg Castle University.

== Educational Concept ==
The Seeburg Castle University is pursuing the concept of a semi-virtual studies. Core of this concept is to combine an Internet-based program with the contact and deepening possibilities of presence studies. Students come here three times per semester for one week in the university to attend courses, take exams and to talk to the students, professors and university coaches.

== Scholarships ==
In cooperation with business partners, the Seeburg Castle University promotes particularly committed students. The corresponding scholarships ranging from training to over power to research grants.

== Accreditation status ==
Under Austrian law, private universities have to be re-accredited on a regular basis.
