= Linz International School Auhof =

Coordinates: 48.3340°N 14.3203°E

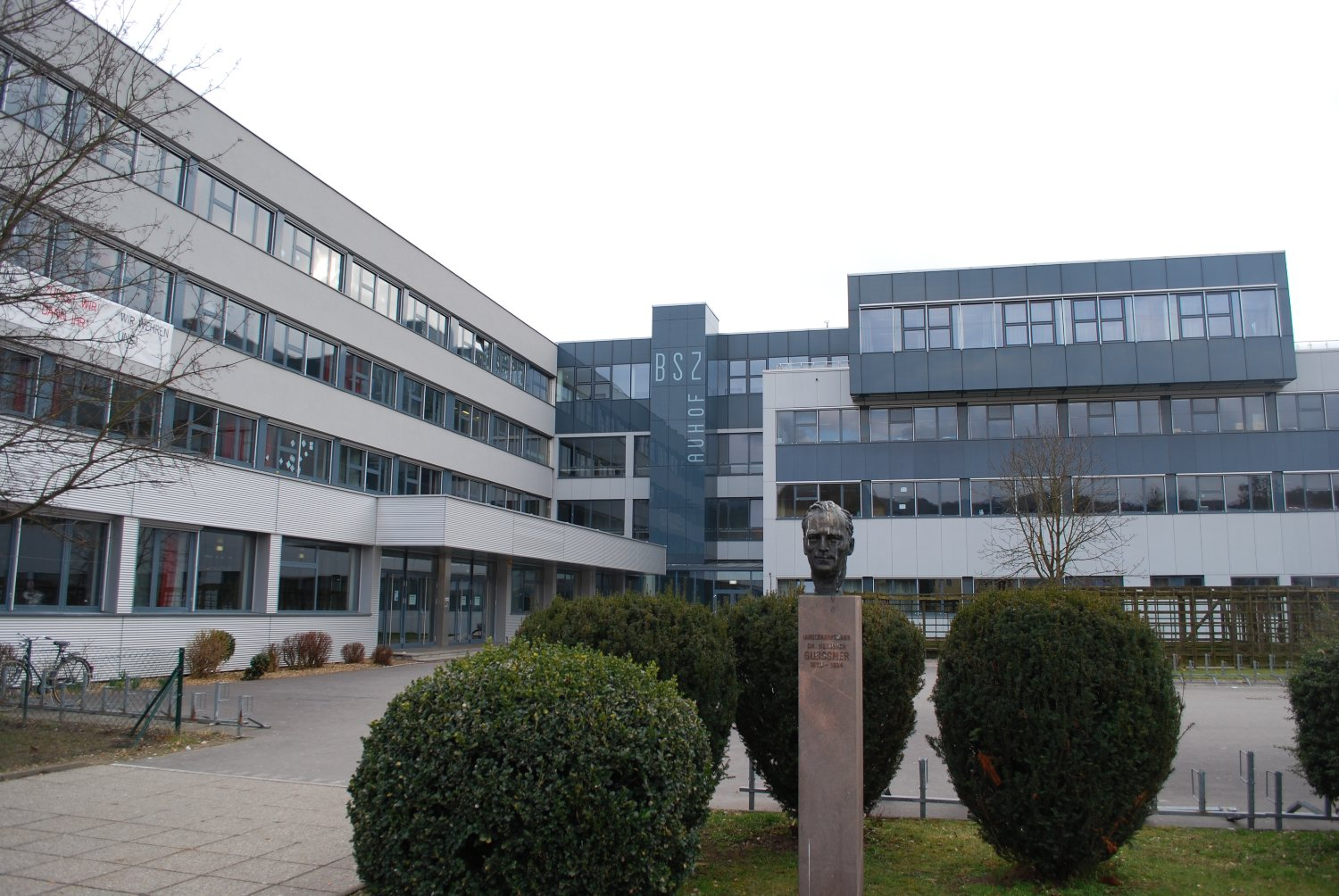
- Linz, Upper Austria; Austria

Information
- Type: Senior Secondary
- Motto: Open the Gate to the World
- Established: 1992
- Headmaster: Mag. Andrea Obermayr-Rauter
- Enrollment: 400+
- Classes: currently 17
- Average class size: ~27
- Campus: Suburban
- Athletics: LISA
- Website: http://lisa.europagym.at

Linz International School Auhof (LISA) is a Public secondary school offering the International Baccalaureate (IB) Diploma as well as the Austrian school leaving certificate (Matura). The language of instruction is German and English during the first two years (grades 5 and 6), and then English. LISA is administrated as one of three school branches of the Europagymnasium Auhof. As of 2009, approximately 450 students attend this school branch.

English is used as a language of instruction in all subjects. English teaching materials are adapted by the teachers to suit the difficulty level of the students. Language assistants encourage students to try out new words and structures. These situations promote natural conversation with native speakers and the students have the opportunity to practice English in practically all of the subjects. Tutorials, which take place primarily in the first year, are lessons in which only two students work with one native speaker. In that way, the students do not only receive full attention, but also experience their own language skills more directly. Student-centered work with authentic English resources is among the most common methods applied from the very beginning.

== Excursions and projects ==
In order to promote inter-cultural understanding, international exchanges and project weeks are an integral part of the LISA curriculum. The following activities take place during the 8 school years:

- Year 1: Getting-to-know-you days in Königswiesen
- Year 2: Winter-Sport-Days
- Year 3: Winter-Sport-Week in Obertraun
- Year 4: England trip: London and Tollesbury
- Year 5: Student exchange between Tokyo and Istanbul for a few selected students.
- Year 6: International exchange program (South Africa, USA, Canada, etc.)
- Year 7: Trip to France/Ireland
- Year 8: Science excursion to Munich

During the past years, student exchanges to Singapore and Thailand were also conducted during the summer holidays.

The quarterly published LISA 4 U contains student articles on trips and all current events at the school.

The annual Walkathon, which is hosted on the school's track field is a charity run for the Child Vision Nepal (CVN). Students are not only incentivised to participate by it being for charity, they also receive prices based on the amount of rounds, which they have run. The Walkathon is mainly organised by the L.I.S.A Unterstützungsverein, its planned mostly at the start of October.
