= Muda Institute =

Art school in Evergem, Belgium

Coordinates: 51.113°N 3.7044°E

The Muda Institute is an arts school in the center of Evergem, Belgium.

There are two options : dance and music. Dance contains ballet, modern dance, jazz and more. Music contains solfège, singing, musical, a primary instrument, a secondary instrument and more. One of the two instruments should be piano, organ, harpsichord or accordion.

Normally the school gives up to ten performances in a year: a student concert, a concert on the open door day, an evaluated concert of the 6th year, and some other performances.
