= English Teacher Training College =

The English Teacher Training College and its associated Bilingual Classroom Initiative (ABCi) was a not-for-profit Austrian college with campuses in Vorchdorf, Pressbaum and Wolfsberg registered with the Federal Ministry of the Interior. Founded by educators Frank Carle, Ben Stone and Jakob Gfrerer in 2011, the college worked in partnership with Austrian students, teachers and schools to promote English culture, language and sport in state schools, while providing subsidized teacher training courses for aspiring teachers.

The activities of the organization revolved around two areas: firstly, as a college, working with Trinity College London and University of Cambridge to provide a practical education in teacher training for student teachers from the English-speaking world. Secondly, as a charity outreach, to promote language learning, cultural exchange and foster understanding between English-speaking countries and Austria by bringing teachers from English-speaking countries into Austrian classrooms to conduct English projects. The college's publicly stated plans were to reach all children in Austria with a free English project by the year 2020 while providing subsidized Teaching English as a Foreign Language courses for young teachers from around the world.

Between 2011 and 2016, the college's initiative worked with 198,805 Austrian children while providing scholarships to study teaching English as a foreign language to new teachers from across the English-speaking world in methodologies like task-based language learning and communicative language teaching.

In spring 2017, the organization partnered with and was officially recognized by the Austrian Ministry of Education

In September 2017, the college came under the control of its new financial benefactor, Gerhard Riedl, a Gmunden-based inventor and businessman. Under his leadership, the college's new board was directed to implement an array of major new measures in an attempt to improve and modernize the college.

In August 2018, the college became insolvent. By that time, they had managed to reach nearly a quarter of a million students.
