= Murmansk College of Arts =

Coordinates: 68.9676°N 33.0818°E

The Murmansk College of Arts located in Murmansk, Russia, trains professional musicians in the region. The college was founded in 1958. The institute specializes in the field of culture and art of the Kola Peninsula.

Its subjects include musical instrument performance, choral conducting, musical variety performance, music theory, and acting.
