= Jam Music Lab =

JAM MUSIC LAB Private University for Jazz and Popular Music Vienna
- JAM MUSIC LAB Privatuniversität für Jazz und Popularmusik Wien
- Type: Private University
- Established: 2011
- Rector: Marcus Ratka
- Location: Vienna, Vienna, Austria; 48°11′06″N 16°25′12″E
- Website: jammusiclab.com

The JAM MUSIC LAB Private University for Jazz and Popular Music Vienna is an Austrian private university located in the Music City Gasometer in the 11th district of Vienna, Austria.

== History ==
It was first founded as a conservatory in June 2011 by Marcus Ratka, Joe Valentin and Andy Bartosh. In November 2011 the Austrian Federal Ministry for Education, Arts and Culture amended regulation on study support for students in conservatories. This in turn gave students in conservatories equal status to other students in Austria when applying for and receiving financial support as part of the Austrian Student Support Act. JAM MUSIC LAB was first granted public status in March 2012 and therefore officially acknowledged by the Ministry of Education, Arts and Culture. Permanent public status was awarded to the conservatory in June 2014. In January 2017 the institute received accreditation as a Private University and became the 13th Private University in Austria and the 3rd that focuses on music and arts.

== Courses ==
JAM MUSIC LAB specializes in the fields of jazz and popular music, divided into the following subjects:

- Artistic Major
- Music Education (IGP)
- Media Music - Film Scoring and Music Production

It offers four-year bachelor studies and subsequent two-year master studies. The following academic degrees can be awarded:

- Bachelor of Arts in Music
- Master of Arts in Music
- Bachelor of Arts in Music Education
- Master of Arts in Music Education

Students are required to pass a special entrance exam in order to be approved for any of the courses/studies. A preliminary course is also offered as a means of preparation for the entrance exam.

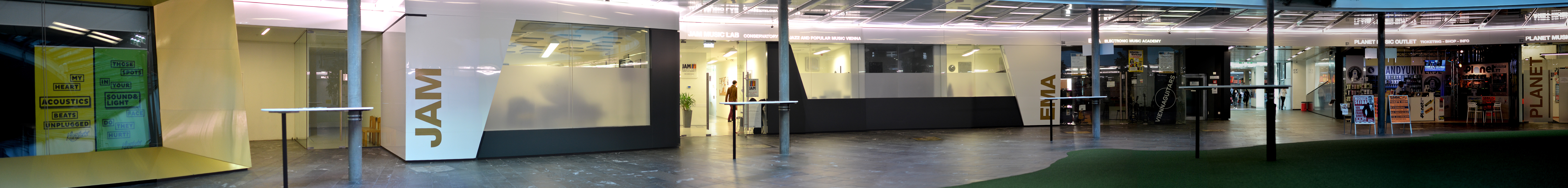
Entrance of the Jam Music Lab in the Gasometer Music City, Vienna
