= Österreichischer Bibliothekenverbund =

The Österreichischer Bibliothekenverbund (obv; English: "Austrian joint library system") is a catalogue and service collaboration for Austrian scientific and administrative libraries centered on the Österreichische Nationalbibliothek (Austrian National Library) and university libraries, among them the University of Vienna, the Technical University of Vienna, Graz University of Technology and the University of Innsbruck. A total of 69 libraries actively participate, more than 310 institutions register magazines.

The collaborative catalogue ("Gesamtkatalog") in November 2005 for Austria contains:

- 4.6 million titles
- 8.7 million exemplars
- 0.6 million magazine references
