= Central European Diabetes Association =

Scientific association

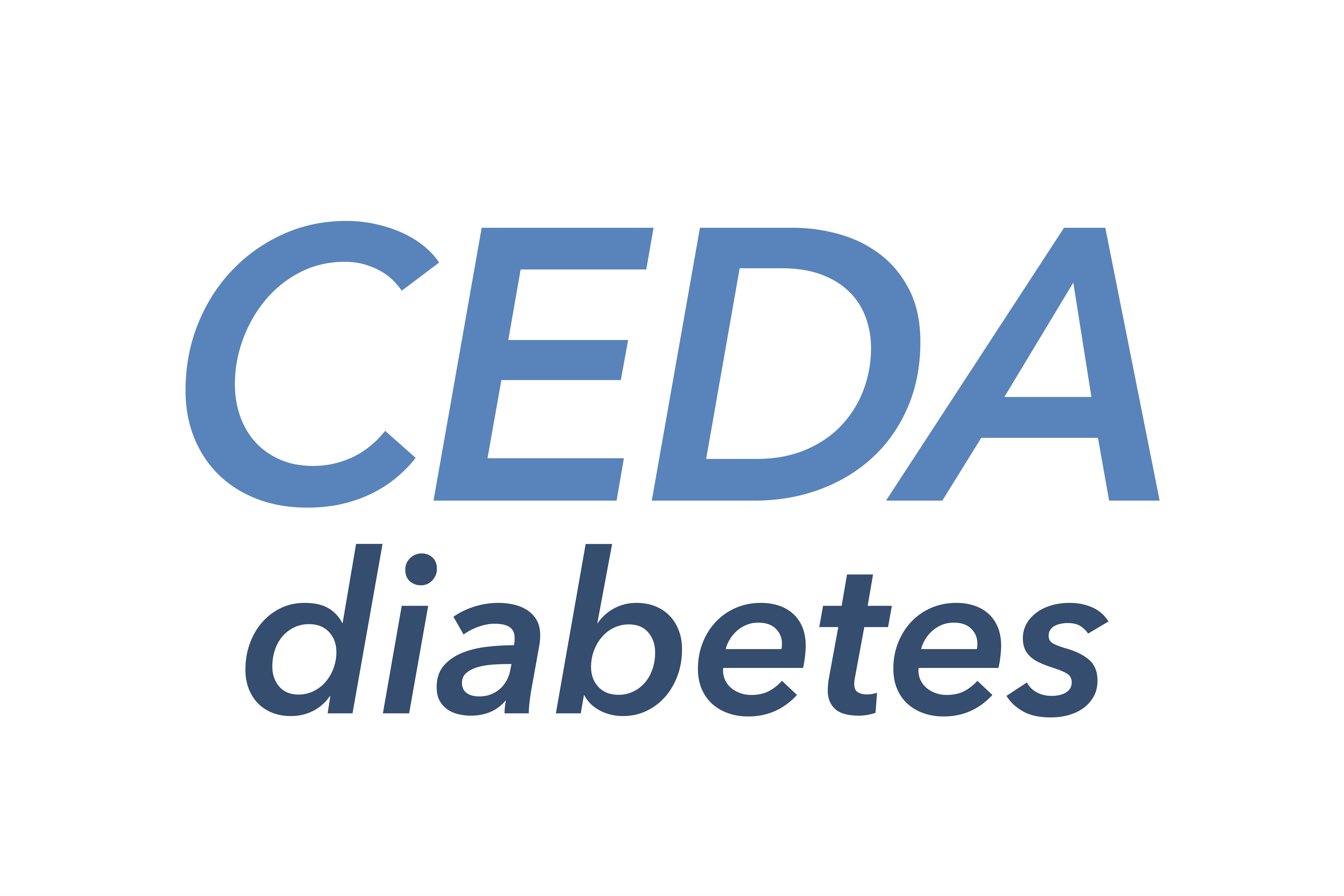
Logo of CEDA diabetes

The Central European Diabetes Association (CEDA) is an international medical and scientific association. CEDA was founded in Vienna, Austria, in 1969 as Federation of International Danube Symposia on Diabetes mellitus (FID). After the inclusion of members from the Baltic States, the name of the association was changed to Central European Diabetes Association in 2006.

== History and current mission ==
During the time of the Cold War, CEDA/FID congresses aimed to serve as a bridge across the Iron Curtain. This was possible because Austria was politically neutral and not a member of NATO, so that it was more easily accessible for diabetologists from Eastern Europe and especially from countries belonging to the Warsaw Pact. Everything started with the idea to bring diabetologists from East and West together despite all political borders to share scientific data and discuss clinical practice. This initiative turned out to be very successful. Currently, CEDA’s mission is to promote the exchange of theoretical and practical knowledge and to align clinical standards with the aim to improve the management of diabetes mellitus and its complications. Despite the geographical proximity, it often appears that the distance between the countries of Central Europe is still bigger than commonly assumed after having been politically separated for decades. Therefore, CEDA contributes to close the gap by exchanging knowledge in the field of diabetology.

== Activities ==
Since 1969, CEDA has organized international congresses, at first every two years, since 2003 annually. In addition, regional and international symposia with speakers from different CEDA countries take place. The CEDA congresses alternate between countries in Central and Eastern Europe.

The official journal of CEDA is the Medline-listed Diabetes, Stoffwechsel und Herz (Diabetes, Metabolism and Heart) that is published six times per year by Kirchheim Verlag (Mainz, Germany). This journal also publishes the CEDA congress abstracts.

== Aims ==
After the political revolutions in 1989, the mission of CEDA is to provide high-quality medical and scientific education related to diabetes in Central and Eastern Europe. This includes the aim to harmonize clinical standards between CEDA countries. Another aim of CEDA consists of giving younger diabetologists the opportunity to present and discuss their research data and to facilitate the contact with international diabetes experts. Initially, German was the official congress language. This has almost been exclusively changed to English for the scientific discussions in order to attract in particular younger scientists and physicians to CEDA and to international diabetes research and practice. In order to promote this exchange, CEDA awards travel grants for its congresses and for internships enabling visits to other diabetes centers in Central Europe for the duration of up to several months.

== Board ==
The board consists of 10 diabetologists from different CEDA countries. The CEDA main office is located in Vienna, Austria. CEDA currently lists 480 members.
