= Henry Kulka =

Czech-New Zealand architect

- Henry Kulka in 1970
- Born: Jindřich Kulka; 29 March 1900; Litovel, Moravia, Austria-Hungary
- Died: 9 May 1971 (aged 71); Auckland, New Zealand
- Occupation: Architect
- Spouse: Hilda Beran
- Children: Richard and Elizabeth (Maru)
- Awards: Henry Kulka won first and second prizes set by Adolf Loos at his building school in 1919
- Buildings: Villa Khuner (with Loos), Kreuzberg; Villa Weismann, Vienna; Villa Semler, Plzeň; Villa Teichner, Spicak/Zelezna Ruda; Villa Kantor, Jablonec; Villa Holzner, Hronov; Kulka House, Auckland; Halberstam House, Wellington; Briess House, Auckland

Henry (Jindřich, Heinrich) Kulka (29 March 1900 – 9 May 1971) was a Czech-New Zealand architect. He was a key figure in the development of Raumplan architecture in central Europe between 1919 and 1938. Kulka brought this approach to spatial planning and the Loosian traditions of natural material craftsmanship to modern building in New Zealand (1940–1971) where he was a pioneer of modern architecture.

== Life ==
Henry Kulka was born on 29 March 1900 into a Jewish family in the town of Litovel near Olomouc in the Czech Republic (then Austria-Hungary). His father Moritz owned and ran the village drapery shop. He was the youngest of three children, having two older sisters. Young Henry was sent to Vienna to complete his secondary education after which he studied architecture at the Technical University of Vienna. As he found his studies uninspiring he did not complete his degree but preferred to continue his architectural development as a pupil of the pioneer modern architect and ideologue Adolf Loos. He became Loos's assistant in 1919 and by the end of 1927 ran a joint architectural practice with Loos as full collaborating partner. In 1927 he married Hilda Beran and they had two children, Richard and Elizabeth (Maru). The young couple was active in the rich intellectual life of Vienna of that time. After Loos died in 1933, Kulka continued his work in Vienna. When the Nazis occupied Austria in 1938 Kulka and his family fled to Czechoslovakia where his wife's family lived. When the Nazis invaded Czechoslovakia he managed to travel to England, being forced to leave his family behind. Thanks to warm letters of recommendation from Jan Masaryk, Arnold Schoenberg and Karin Michaëlis he obtained visas for his family and himself to emigrate to New Zealand. After travelling by separate routes he was united with his family in New Zealand. He settled in Auckland where he found employment with the Fletcher Construction Company. He was chief architect at Fletcher's, designing numerous commercial buildings as well as private residences, until his retirement in 1960. From 1960 to his death in 1971 he designed and realised private houses prolifically. He died in Auckland in 1971 aged 71.

== Career ==
=== Early work ===
Villa Khuner, eastern façade, Kreutzberg, Semmering, Austria in 1930

In 1919 after a brief period at the Technical University in Vienna, Henry Kulka began his studies at the Building School of the pioneer modern architect Adolf Loos. Loos emphasized that all architecture should be related to human activity and evolve from it: form follows function. Loos was opposed to unnecessary ornamentation in architecture. He advocated the use of natural unadulterated materials and a respect for skilled craftsmanship. His designs included specifications of internal lining of quality materials such as stone marble and wood. The unique feature of Loos's design was three dimensional planning later named Raumplan by Kulka and described in Kulka's words; "The rooms of his houses are situated on various levels, inter-related in harmonious proportions, space flowing into space, but forming a compact unit. The levels are not bound to a special floor (ground floor, first floor, etc.) and are not the result of simply dividing a high room into mezzanine parts. The floors are inter-related rooms with open vistas, the levels connected by steps".

Kulka had an affinity for Loos's thinking and an aptitude for three dimensional planning, he became Loos's assistant (1919) and later became his partner (1927), further developing the Raumplan concept.

In 1922 Kulka assisted Loos on the realisation of the first cubic Raumplan house, the Villa Rufer in Hietzing Vienna. Between 1921 and 1922 Kulka designed, autonomously, a cubic Raumplan in smaller cubic dimensions than the Villa Rufer. Kulka's autonomously designed prototype became subsequently known as the Cubic, Dice or Würfelhaus, and was realised in Vienna by Kulka a decade later at 55 Künniglbergasse, Hietzing.

During the period 1923–1927 Kulka worked between Stuttgart, Vienna and Paris. Loos was based in Paris during this period. Kulka collaborated with Ernst Otto Oswald on the winning entry of the competition to design the Stuttgart Tagblatt Tower, which was built in 1927. In 1927 Kulka spent the year heading Loos's office in Paris, leading the design of the Villa Moller Raumplan (after Loos and Kulka's colleague Zlatko Neuman had returned to Zagreb), the Paris Kniže & Comp. fashion boutique and other unrealised projects such as the famous Raumplan Villa for Josephine Baker. In 1928 Kulka and Loos returned to Vienna and ran an atelier as full collaborating partners. Henry Kulka's wife, Hilda Kulka née Beran, was their practice manager during this period. In the last years of his life Loos was less active due to the deterioration of his health.

During those years the works often attributed to Loos such as the Khuner house of 1929 in Semmering, Austria were principally designed by Kulka. In the same period Kulka was also involved in planning Villa Müller in Prague, and the Wien Werkbund Houses.

In 1930 Kulka authored the seminal monograph on Loos's work; Adolf Loos: The work of the Architect published by Anton Schroll Verlag.

=== Late work in Europe ===
Villa Semler, galleried Raumplan apartment, realised in 1933-4 for Oskar Semler, Plzeň, Czechoslovakia. View from lower hall into main lower lounge and fireplace in fire niche with lowered ceiling.

After Loos's death in 1933, Kulka continued and expanded their former architectural practice, maintaining their Vienna office and opening a second satellite office in Hradec Králové in Czechoslovakia to service commissions across Bohemia and Moravia.

Between 1932 and 1939 Kulka evolved new cubic Raumplan Villa and Apartment typologies. In addition to functionality, Kulka's approach was humanistic. He considered the feelings of people inhabiting the space of his buildings, striving to give them a sense of harmony and well-being. Among these works are the 1932 Weissmann House in Hietzing Vienna, the 1933 Oskar Semler Raumplan Apartment in Plzeň, the 1934 Kantor Cubic Raumplan Villa in Jablonec nad Nisou, the 1934 small mountain Raumplan for Dr. Samuel Teichner in Špičák in Železná Ruda and the Villa Holzner Raumplan in Hronov.

Villa Kantor Raumplan in Jablonec nad Nisou, 1934. View of south facing garden façade.

A fine example of Kulka's Raumplan work at this time is the Villa Kantor, 1934. This cubic Raumplan was tailored to the requirements of a medical doctor who needed a functional consulting room nestled within the corpus of a comfortable family home. The exterior envelope of the building is cubic and rendered in fine stucco punctured by symmetrical fenestration in the front façade and a functional asymmetrical positioning of fenestration at the sides of the house. The symmetry of the façade is maintained through the use of a classical wall projection which accommodates internal circulation. The interior of the Raumplan villa is clad with light colored woods and marble. The house has larger windows than Kulka's villas with Loos. Kulka lets in more light and incorporates a lighter chromatic selection of cladding materials. It is in the more relaxed and subtle management of spatial transition that the Villa Kantor evolves raumplanning, and this points toward changes Kulka would bring to his later work in New Zealand.

=== Work in New Zealand ===
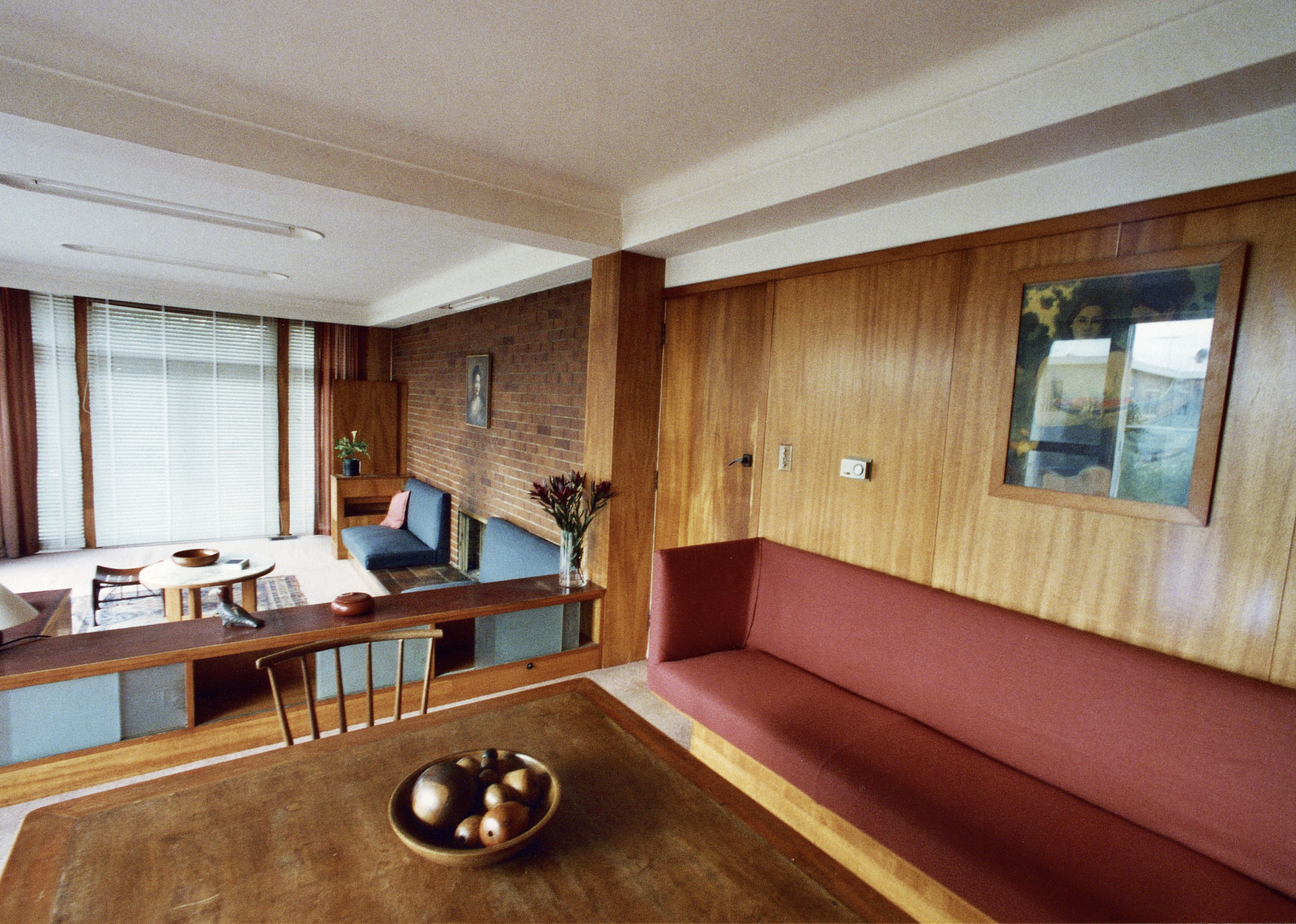
Harvey House "Four Winds". Wooden private residence for industrialist Alex Harvey, Auckland, New Zealand, 1944.

Kulka understood that he could not transplant his European mode of operation to New Zealand. He adapted remarkably well to the very different conditions of building, which included climate, construction methods, materials and availability of space. The compact style of building which characterized his more vertically oriented European work became less necessary. He retained many elements which characterized his European houses such as built in seating surrounding a fireplace, built in furniture in the periphery of rooms, raised dining areas opening on living space and flat roofs. He had an extraordinary sense of quality and recognized the beauty of New Zealand wood, lining his houses with fine wooden paneling. Kulka said that he "wanted the interiors of his houses to look like the inside of a violin." At first his style was considered to be eccentric and provocative by the public but in later years it was emulated by young modern architects.

From 1940 until 1960 Kulka was the chief architect of the Fletcher Construction Company for whom he designed a large number of commercial and public buildings as well as private houses. His designs were diverse: family homes, bungalows, beach houses, bush baches, galleried houses, apartments, libraries, churches and monuments. These were largely realized in New Zealand, although he did build a limited amount of structures through Fletcher Building in Samoa, Tonga and Fiji. Kulka followed changes to building technology closely and employed these new techniques in his commercial designs. Kulka is estimated to have designed and realized over a hundred commercial structures throughout the period of New Zealand's post-war industrialization. Characteristic features of Kulka's commercial structures include simple, solid facades and the avoidance of structural or decorative exhibitionism. His simple exterior envelopes accorded with a post-war mood, which favoured civic modesty and utility. The reception and board rooms of these commercial structures were lined with indigenous wood and stone. Kulka introduced many innovations into his industrial designs including natural lighting and the introduction to New Zealand of the saw-tooth factory ceiling. In the E. A. Robinson building (1959) Kulka designed a double fenestration system so that offices within the deeper sections of that structure could benefit from internal glass facades which enabled natural light to reach them. In the entrance to Fletcher Building (1941–1942) Kulka designed a dramatic curved staircase lined with light marble and amber native wood.

Fisher and Paykel (F&P) head offices and factory, Mt Wellington, Auckland, New Zealand, 1955

Innes Schweppes - Coca-Cola Building, Hamilton, New Zealand, 1955

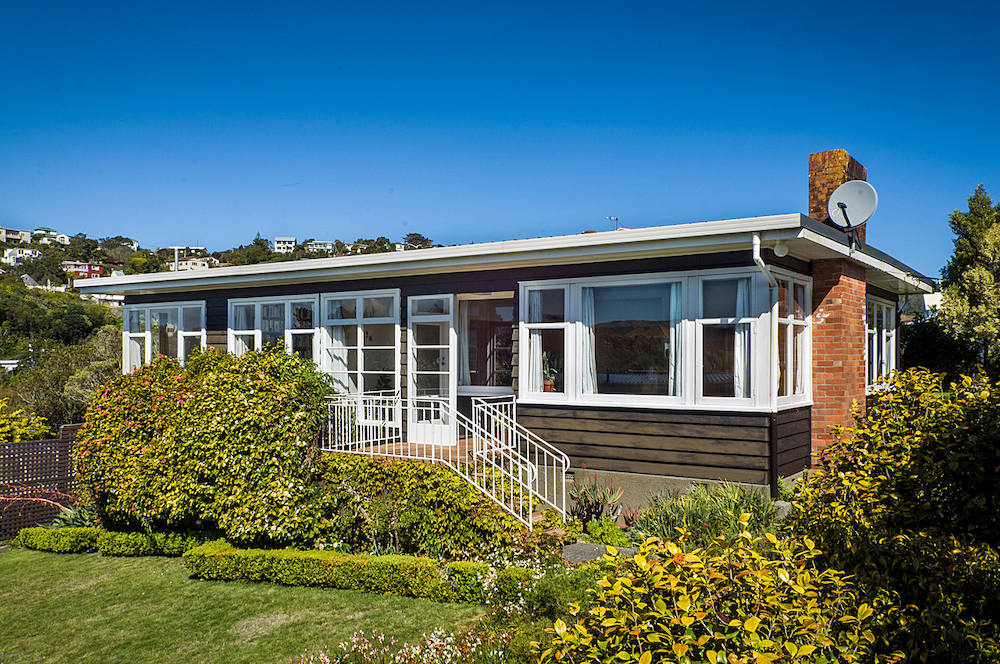
Halberstam House, Wellington, New Zealand, 1948. View of front of house.

Westerly view into the Halberstam lounge showing built in couch, large northerly fenestration, and projecting room divider-library. Walls lined with native rimu.

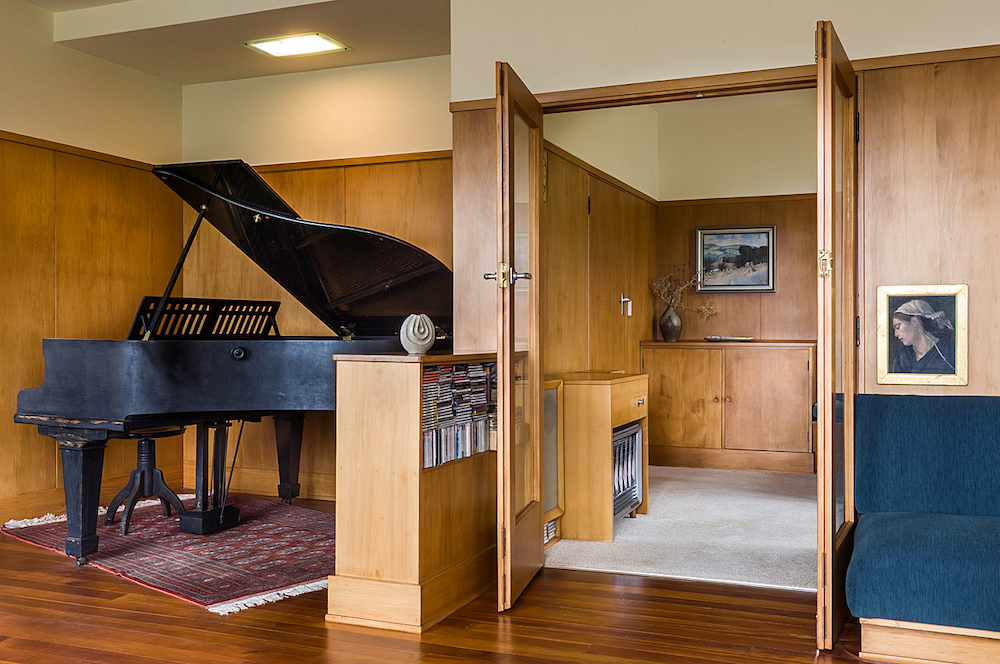
Halberstam House, Wellington, New Zealand, 1948. Southeast facing interior lounge view.

Privately, Kulka realised over 40 wooden houses throughout New Zealand. The Halberstam House in Wellington (1948) is an example of Kulka's ability to design compact minimal dwellings. The single level bungalow sits on top of a small hill in Wellington. It had a relatively small construction budget, and post war building restrictions were imposed on the commissioners. Despite these constraints, Kulka built a cubic bungalow clad with dark stained weather boards on the exterior with a luminous interior consisting of fine honey coloured native wood panels and fibrous plaster. In this modest-sized family home, a small piano nook is built into the lounge. This nook is separated from the main body of the lounge by the minimal gesture of a bookcase which projects a little into the lounge. A small, lowered ceiling above the nook adds to the sense of separateness of the sub-space. Built-in seating on either side of a fireplace are positioned toward the view of northerly hills and the light. Comfort, economy, and functionality are brought together to achieve a sense of refinement. Despite the Halberstam villa's more modest scale compared to other Kulka Houses in New Zealand, it remains exemplary of the spirit of his work spatially and materially. Kulka's prolific building continues to influence Modern Architecture in New Zealand.

Roberta Avenue House, Auckland, New Zealand, 1962. South East front exterior view.

== List of works ==
Parker Pen retail store, Vienna, Austria from 1935

=== Major European works ===
==== Assisting Loos ====
- 1919–1922, Heuberg and Lainz Siedlungs, Vienna
- 1922, Villa Rufer, Vienna
- 1922–23, 20 Villas Project, (unrealised)
- 1927, Knize Men's Couturier, Paris
- 1927, Villa Moller, planning in Paris, construction supervised by Jacques Groag, Vienna
- 1927, Maison Baker, Raumplan Project (unrealised), for the American entertainer Josephine Baker
- 1928, Villa Müller, Prague

==== In partnership or collaboration with Loos ====
- 1928, Zelenka Commercial Building, (unrealised) Vienna
- 1929, Bojko Raumplan Villa Project (unrealised), Vienna
- 1929, Portal, Men's fashion Retail, Albert Matzner, Rotenturmstrasse 6, Vienna
- 1930, Portal, Men's fashion Retail, Albert Matzner, Kohlmessergasse 8, Vienna
- 1930, Country House (Landhaus) Khuner, Kreuzberg, Payerbach
- 1932, Werkbundsiedlung Dopplehäuser, Hietzing, Vienna

==== European works ====
- 1930, Kawafag Weekendhaus, Type Hygiene, realised in Dresden 1931
- 1932, Villa Weissmann, Cubic Raumplan House, Hietzing, Vienna
- 1933, Oskar Semler Raumplan Apartment, Plzeň
- 1934, Teichner Mountain Raumplan House, Špičák/Železná
- 1934, Villa Kantor Cubic Raumplan, Jablonec
- 1934 Knize Menswear Store, Prague
- 1935, Royal Tobacconist retail store, Bucharest
- 1935, Parker Pen Shop, Vienna
- 1937, Villa Hoeboken, Vienna
- 1938–39, Löwenbach stepped apartment building, Hradec Králové
- 1939, Villa Holzner Raumplan, Hronov

=== Selected New Zealand work ===
Maple Furniture Store, Front Façade. Lower Hutt, New Zealand, 1960's

==== Commercial ====
- 1941, Fletcher Building Head offices and Plywood factory, Auckland
- 1944, Factory Dominion Industries, Dunedin
- 1947, Methodist Church, Apia, Western Samoa
- 1948, Project for The National Bank of New Zealand, Auckland
- 1953, Portland Cement Works, Whangarei
- 1954, Dalgety & Co., Hamilton
- 1955, C.L Innes and Co. Ltd, Hamilton (now renamed the Meteor Theatre)
- 1955, Factory and Offices Fisher & Paykel, Auckland
- c. 1955, Kempthorn & Prosser, renovations to premises
- 1957, Vulcan Steel, Auckland
- c. 1959, Robinson Printing Works, Auckland
- 1959, Dominion Breweries, extensions

==== Selected private residences ====
Kulka also designed private residences.

- 1947, House Briess, St Heliers, Auckland
- 1948, House Halberstam, Wellington
- 1948, House Friedlander, West Auckland, Auckland
- 1948, House Tretter, Kohimarama, Auckland
- c.1952, House Hoffmann, Drury
- 1958, House Fletcher, Epsom, Auckland
- 1960, Speight Road Apartments, Mission Bay, Auckland
- 1960, House Strauss, St Johns, Auckland
- 1962, House Schenirer, Howick, Auckland
- 1962, House Mayer, St Heliers, Auckland
- 1964, House Fischmann, Remuera, Auckland
- 1965, House Fraser, Pokuru, Te Awamutu
- 1966, House Mayerhoffler, Blockhouse Bay, Auckland
- 1967, House Marti and Gerrard Friedlander, Herne Bay, Auckland
- 1969, House Marleyn, North Shore, Auckland

== Publications ==
Kulka authored numerous professional texts on architecture, including:

- Kulka, H, 'Das Kawafag-Weekendhaus. Type Hygiene-Dresden 1930-31', Das Kawafag-Eigenheim, Nr. 3 (1931)
- Kulka, H, 'Adolf Loos: Das Werk des Architekten' (Vienna: Anton Schroll Verlag), 1931
- Kulka, H, 'Adolf Loos', Österreichische Kunst 1 (1931)
- Kulka, H, 'Byt a Umeni', O nezbytnych a zbytecnych vecech v modernim byte, 4, (1931)
- Kulka, H, 'Portal, Wien 1, Rotenturmstrasse mit A. Loos', Profil, 2:4 (1934)
- Kulka, H, 'Dom jednorodzinny Wien-Lainz' Dom Osiedle Mieszkanie, 7, (1936)
- Kulka, H, 'A Small House in Vienna', The Architect and Building News, 145, 25.03.1936
- Kulka, H, 'Ein Arzthaus in Gablonz, Forum (Bratislava) 7 (1937)
- Kulka, H, 'Adolf Loos: 1870-1933', in Architects' Year Book 9, ed, by. Trevor Dannatt (London: Elek, 1957)
- Kulka, H, 'Bekenntnis zu Adolf Loos' Alte und Moderne Kunst 15 (1970)

== Select bibliography ==
- Behalová, Vera 'Beitrag zu einer Kulka-Forschung', Bauforum, 43 (1974), 22–31
- Coppa, Alessandra, 'Adolf Loos', (Ore Cultura Srl: 2013)
- Duzer, Leslie Van, and Kent Kleinmann, Villa Müller: A Work of Adolf Loos (New York: Princeton Architectural Press, 1994)
- Ficker, Ludwig von, Briefwechsel 3 (Innsbruck: Haymon Verlag, 1991)
- Hlawatsch, Robert, 'Erinnerungen an Adolf Loos und an die Loos-Schule', Bauwelt, 42 (1981), 1893
- Kurrent, Friedrich 'Heinrich Kulka: Typescript 30.8.1966' Anrufe, Zurufe, Nachrufe (Salzburg: Müry Salzmann, 2010)
- Risselada, Max, ed., Raumplan versus Plan Libre, 2nd English edn. (New York: Rizzoli, 1988, repr. Rotterdam: 010 Publishers, 2008)
- Roth, Alfred, Begegnung mit Pionieren, (Basel and Stuttgart: Birkhäuser Verlag, 1973)
- Sapák, Jan, 'Heinrich Kulka: Villa Kantor a Jablonec 1933-34', Domus, 726 (1991), 100–107
- Weissenbacher, Gerhard, In Hietzing gebaut vol. II (Vienna: Verlag Holzhausen, 1998)
