= Rufer =

Rufer may refer to:

== People ==
- Adam Rufer (born 1991), Czech ice hockey player
- Alex Rufer (born 1996), New Zealand football player
- Josef Rufer (1893–1985), Austrian-born musicologist
- Rudy Rufer (1926–2010), American baseball player
- Shane Rufer (born 1960), New Zealand football player
- Wynton Rufer (born 1962), New Zealand football player

== Places ==
- Rufer House, Vienna

== Other ==
- Der Rufer
- Roofer
