= Steiner House =

Building in Vienna, Austria

Coordinates: 48.18389°N 16.28317°E

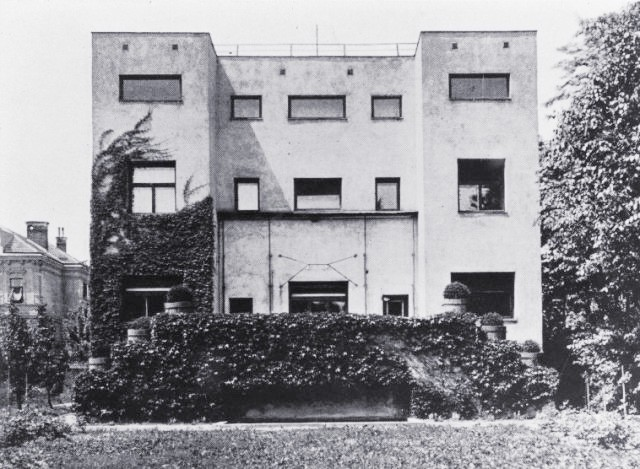

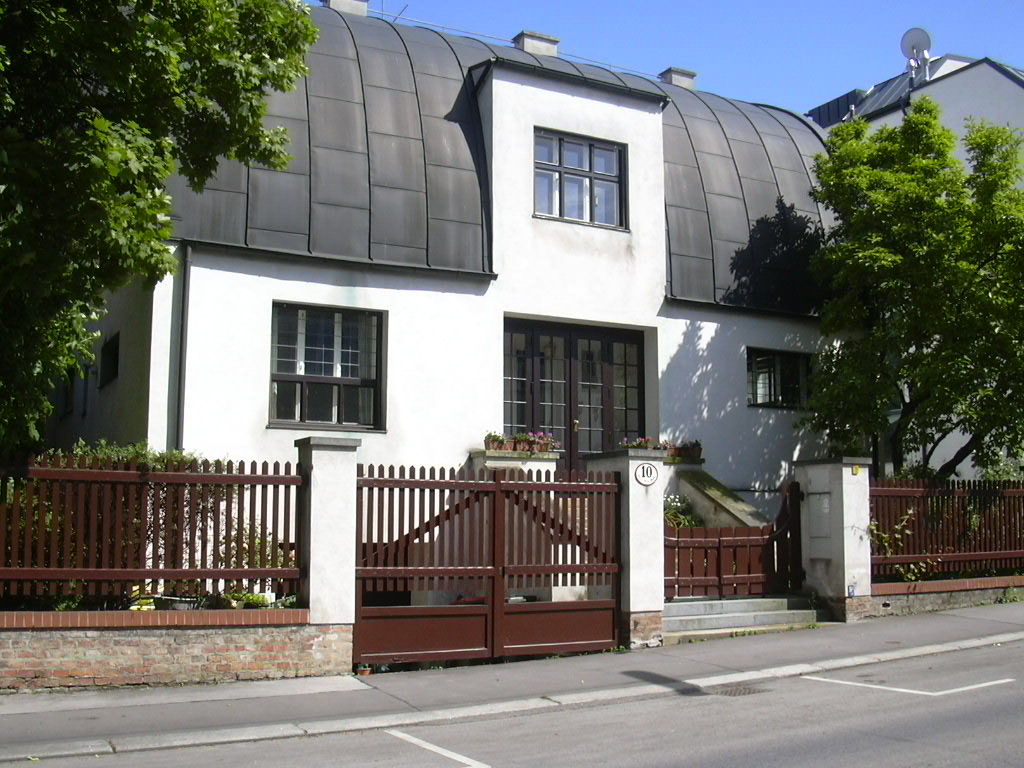
Haus Steiner, Sankt-Veit-Gasse 10, Vienna

Steiner House is a building in Vienna, Austria. It is considered one of the major works of architect Adolf Loos.

== Background ==
Loos was still starting his career in 1910 when he designed and constructed the Steiner house in Vienna, Austria. This design was much better accepted than Loos' earlier works and quickly became a worldwide example of rationalist architecture. In his buildings, Loos normally starts with one main volume in which the space, configuration, and elements follows the rules and composition of classical architecture. He organizes the interior of that volume with smaller cubes, rectangles boxes, and cylinders arranged in a volumetric puzzle of sorts. This determines the internal organization of his buildings and Loos regularly uses protrusions from the main block to create other areas of the building such as terraces. In the Steiner house, Loos uses his volumes to create a classical tripartite façade. He does this by creating a recess between the two wings of the house that continues straight to the roof. In general, Loos lets his fenestration be subdivided into squares and rectangles that all obey a modular system, which correspond perfectly with the geometry of the façade. This system sets up order on the interior such as the living room being connected to a terrace that has access to the garden. Even in this early design, Loos uses interior organization that would remain with him throughout his career.

The Steiner house features a living area that is raised slightly above the ground level and separated from more private areas of the house such as bedrooms and painting studio, which was located on the first floor. (Note: In parts of Europe, the "first floor" of a building is the first floor above ground level. Thus, the first floor is distinguished from the ground floor. In the United States, the first floor and the ground floor are generally synonymous. See storey.) The served space in this house is neatly separated from the serving space by placing the serving space in the basement and attic. This was the style for which Loos strove: a refined and intricate interior with a simple and nonthreatening exterior.

The Steiner house has a stucco façade like most of his other buildings but not without reason. Loos built his buildings with roughcast walls and used the stucco to form a protective skin over the bricks. Loos did not want to use the stucco as a cheap imitation rock and condemned that practice; in general he used stucco for its functionality. The stucco façades have another benefit: they create a smooth, unornamented, and white surface. This surface represents the nature of the material and also does not hint to what is inside the building.

Most of Loos' works were located in open lots and did not need any party walls and yet they faced other constraints that he had to work around. In the case of the Steiner house, Loos was only able build one floor above the street level. This led him to create a one quarter round roof that is facing the street. This roof flattens out the apex and makes the two additional floors that look out onto the garden impossible to see from the street. The curved roof was an interesting choice because it was not a straight break from gabled roofs or a brand new innovative idea. Instead it was meant to demonstrate certainty of form and economy of space, proving that traditions can be manipulated or rid of completely, for a functional and non-aesthetic purpose.
