= Claire Beck Loos =

Czech-Austrian photographer and writer

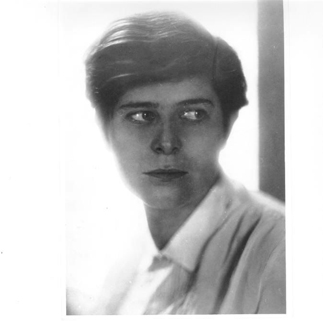
- Claire Beck Loos, self-portrait, late 1920s. (Courtesy: Study and Dokumentation Centrum, Villa Müller, Prague, Czech Republic)
- Born: 4 November 1904; Plzeň, Austria-Hungary
- Died: 19 January 1942 (aged 37); Riga, Reichskommissariat Ostland
- Occupations: writer, photographer
- Spouse: Adolf Loos (1929–1932)
- Writing career
- Notable work: Adolf Loos Privat

Claire Beck Loos (4 November 1904 – 19 January 1942) was a Czech-Austrian photographer and writer. She was the third wife of early modernist Czechoslovak-Austrian architect Adolf Loos.

== Biography ==
Claire Beck was born in Plzeň, Bohemia, Austria-Hungary (now the Czech Republic) in 1904, one of three children of Olga (Feigl) Beck and Otto Beck.

Claire became engaged to Adolf Loos (1870–1933) after he invited the Beck family to see a Josephine Baker performance in Vienna in the spring of 1929. They were married in Vienna on 18 July of the same year over her parents' opposition to the much older Adolf. Because it was a mixed marriage (Claire was from a Jewish family, Adolf was not), the Jewish community refused to execute the marriage. They divorced in 1932.

Loos's immediate and extended relations—the Beck, Hirsch, Turnowsky, and Kraus families—and her friends the Semlers were some of Adolf's first clients. They hired him to remodel apartment interiors in Plzeň and Vienna, and it was there that Adolf first began to open up the "interstitial spaces" between walls to create continuous rooms.

In 1936, Loos published Adolf Loos Privat, a literary work of "razor-sharp anecdotes" about her ex-husband's character, habits, and sayings that was illustrated with family photographs. Published by the Johannes-Presse in Vienna, the book was intended to raise funds for Adolf Loos's tomb, as he had died destitute three years earlier.

Loos and her mother were forced to leave Plzeň and move to Prague at the beginning of World War II and were later deported to Theresienstadt concentration camp, Claire in 1941 and Olga in 1942. They were separately transported from there to Riga, German-occupied Latvia, where they were presumably shot or gassed on arrival in 1942.

== Legacy ==
In 2012–2013, some of Loos's photographs were included in the exhibition Vienna's Shooting Girls: Jewish Women Photographers in Vienna.

In 2011, Adolf Loos Privat was published in its first English translation under the title Adolf Loos: A Private Portrait.
