= Villa Müller =

Modernist villa in Prague, Czech Republic

- Müllerova vila
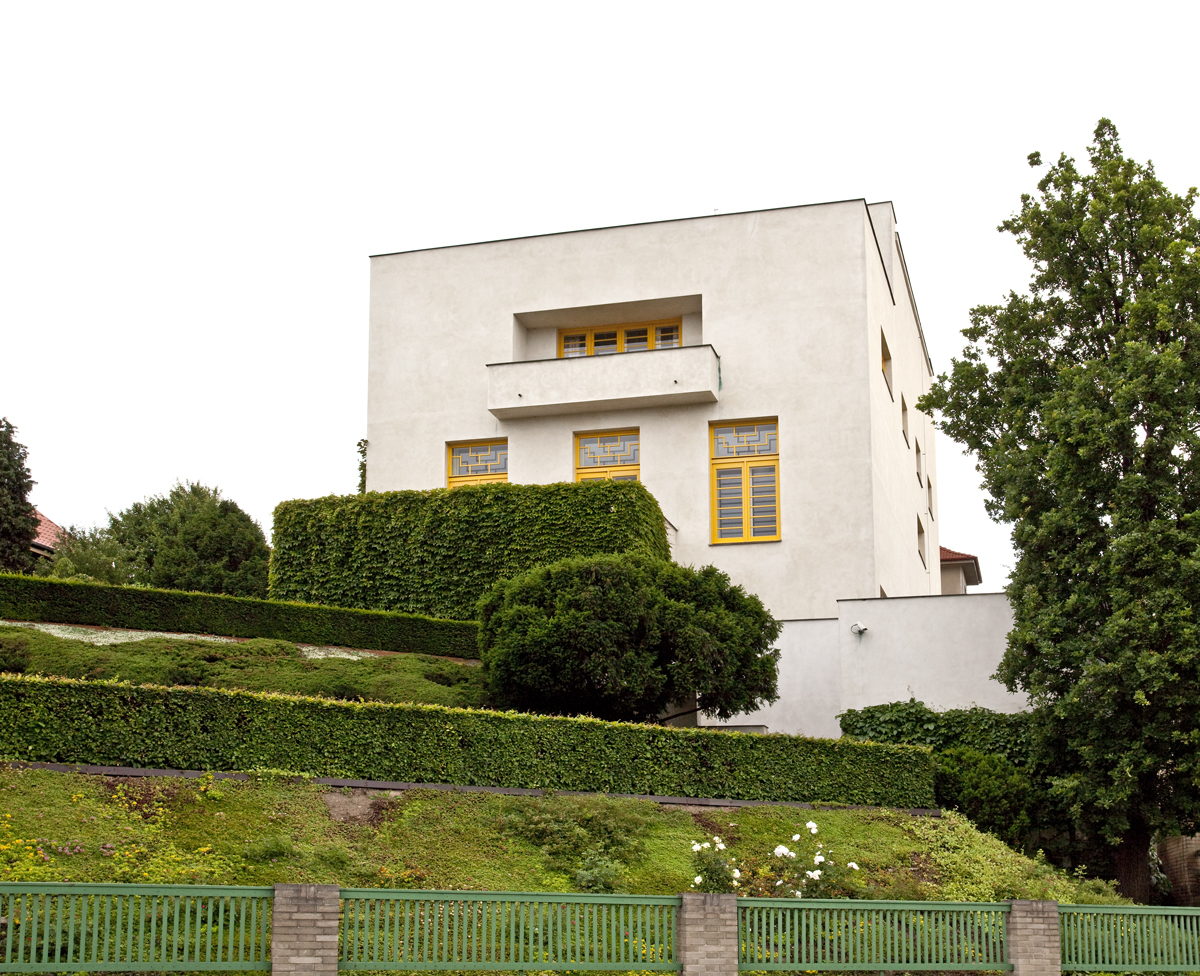
- Front side facing the city view
- Interactive map of the Villa Müller area

General information
- Architectural style: Modernism
- Location: Prague-Střešovice, Czech Republic
- Coordinates: 50°05′33″N 14°22′42″E
- Completed: 1930
- Client: František and Milada Müller

Design and construction
- Architect: Adolf Loos

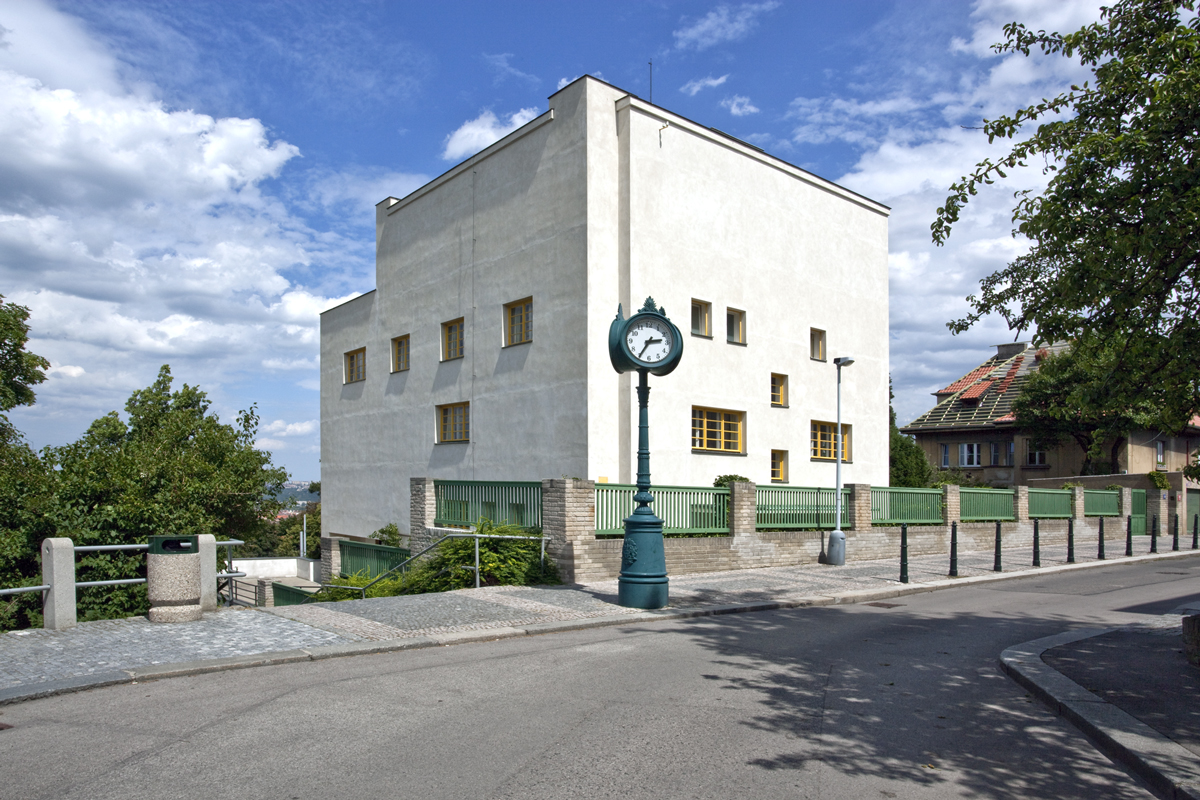
Main entrance on the street side

The Villa Müller (Czech: Müllerova vila) is a Modernist villa in Prague, Czech Republic built in 1930. It was designed by Adolf Loos as a residence for František Müller, co-owner of the Kapsa-Müller construction company from Plzeň.

== History ==
The building was commissioned by František Müller and his wife, Milada Müllerová. Mr. Müller was an engineer and co-owned a construction company called Kapsa and Müller. The company specialized in reinforced concrete, developing new construction techniques. Loos' method of design was also in transition, making the timing of the project appropriate. Soon, the architect Karel Lhota set František Müller up with Loos to design the villa. Lhota also contributed to the design due to Loos' poor health. After the building was completed, Loos celebrated his 60th birthday there with a few friends.

The couple freely inhabited the house for eighteen years before Communists seized control of it in 1948. In 1968, after the death of Milada Müllerová (Note: Up to this time, she could occupy only two rooms in the villa.) the most important parts of the Villa fittings and collections were purchased by the Museum of Applied Arts and the National Gallery. (Note: Simultaneously, the house is temporarily taken over by the Institute of marxism-leninism.) The Villa was then pronounced a Cultural Monument of the Czechoslovak Republic. It was used as a storage, library, and later as a location for the institute of Marxism–Leninism. After the fall of Communism in 1989, the house was turned over to the Müllers' daughter, Eva Maternová. She sold it to the City of Prague in 1995, who put it in the care of the City of Prague Museum. The house was restored in 1998 and finally re-opened as a museum in 2000. From February 2025, the villa is closed for renovation until at least April 2026.

== Architecture ==
Known as an innovative landmark of early modernist architecture, the Villa Müller embodies Loos' ideas of economy and functionality. The spatial design, known as Raumplan, is evident in the multi-level parts of individual rooms, indicating their function and symbolic importance. Raumplan is exhibited in the interior as well as the exterior.

My architecture is not conceived in plans, but in spaces (cubes). I do not design floor plans, facades, sections. I design spaces. For me, there is no ground floor, first floor, etc. ... For me, there are only contiguous, continual spaces, rooms, anterooms, terraces, etc. Storeys merge and spaces relate to each other.

— Shorthand record of a conversation in Plzeň (1930), Adolf Loos

The exterior displayed Loos' theory discussed in his 1908 essay, "Ornament and Crime". In the essay, Loos criticized decorated surfaces. For the exterior of the Villa Müller, Loos designed a white, cubic facade. He also wanted to distinguish between the outside, where the view could be seen by the public eye, and the inside, the private spaces of those who lived there. Consequently, the interior is lavishly decorated with comfortable furniture and marble, wood, and silk surfaces.

== Colomina: space and sexuality ==
Architectural historian Beatriz Colomina examined and discussed the Villa Müller in the book Sexuality and Space (1992), which focused on the relationships between sexuality and space within the structure. Colomina's essay, The Split Wall: Domestic Voyeurism, discusses the possible purpose of Loos' opaque, covered windows in the house. Colomina includes Loos' idea of a theater box as a claustrophobic space if not for the large, open space to look out on. The theater box could signify power and control inside of the house, according to Colomina.

Loos designed a raised sitting area which Colomina interprets as the theater box as well as the 'female' space because of its domestic character. Moreover, Colomina suggests that the 'female' space is considered private and contrasts with the 'male' public spaces of the house. The theater box draws attention to itself, and at the same time the occupant of the box is looking out, the person looking at it views the most intimate space. Therefore, the person in the theater box is objectified.
