= Café Museum =

Viennese café in Vienna, Austria

Coordinates: 48.201514°N 16.367554°E

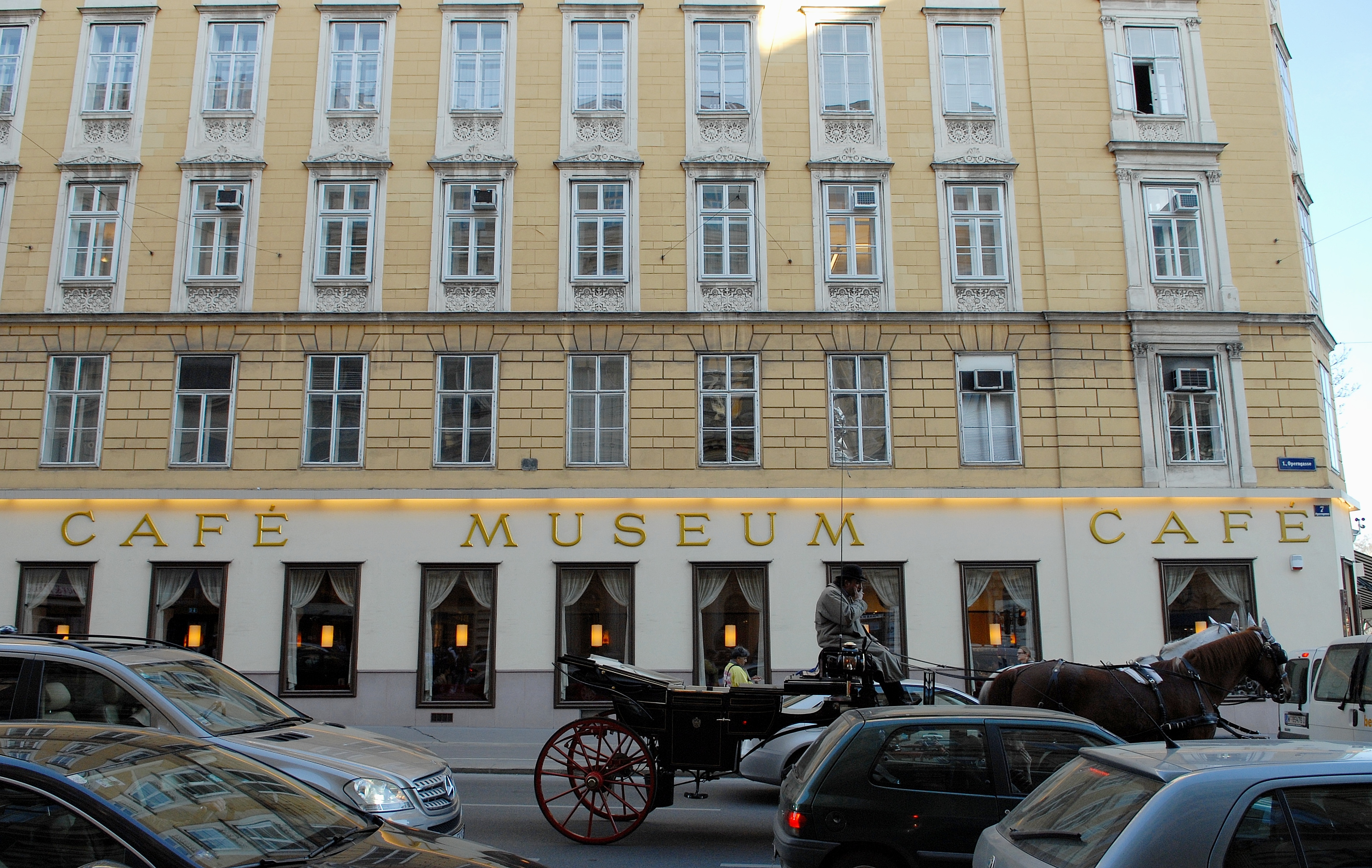
Café Museum, view from outside, Operngasse, 2012

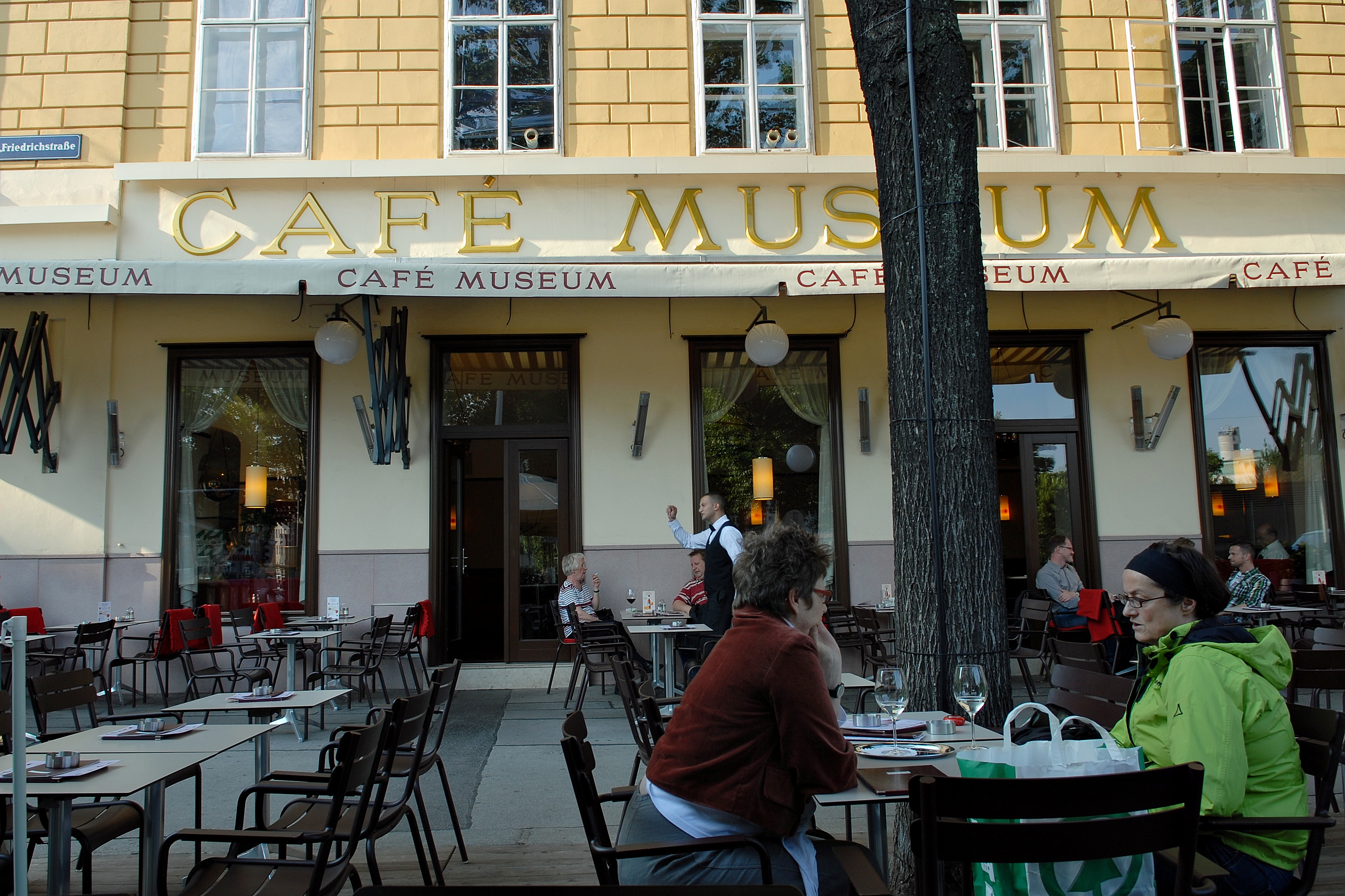
Café Museum, view from outside, Friedrichstraße, 2011

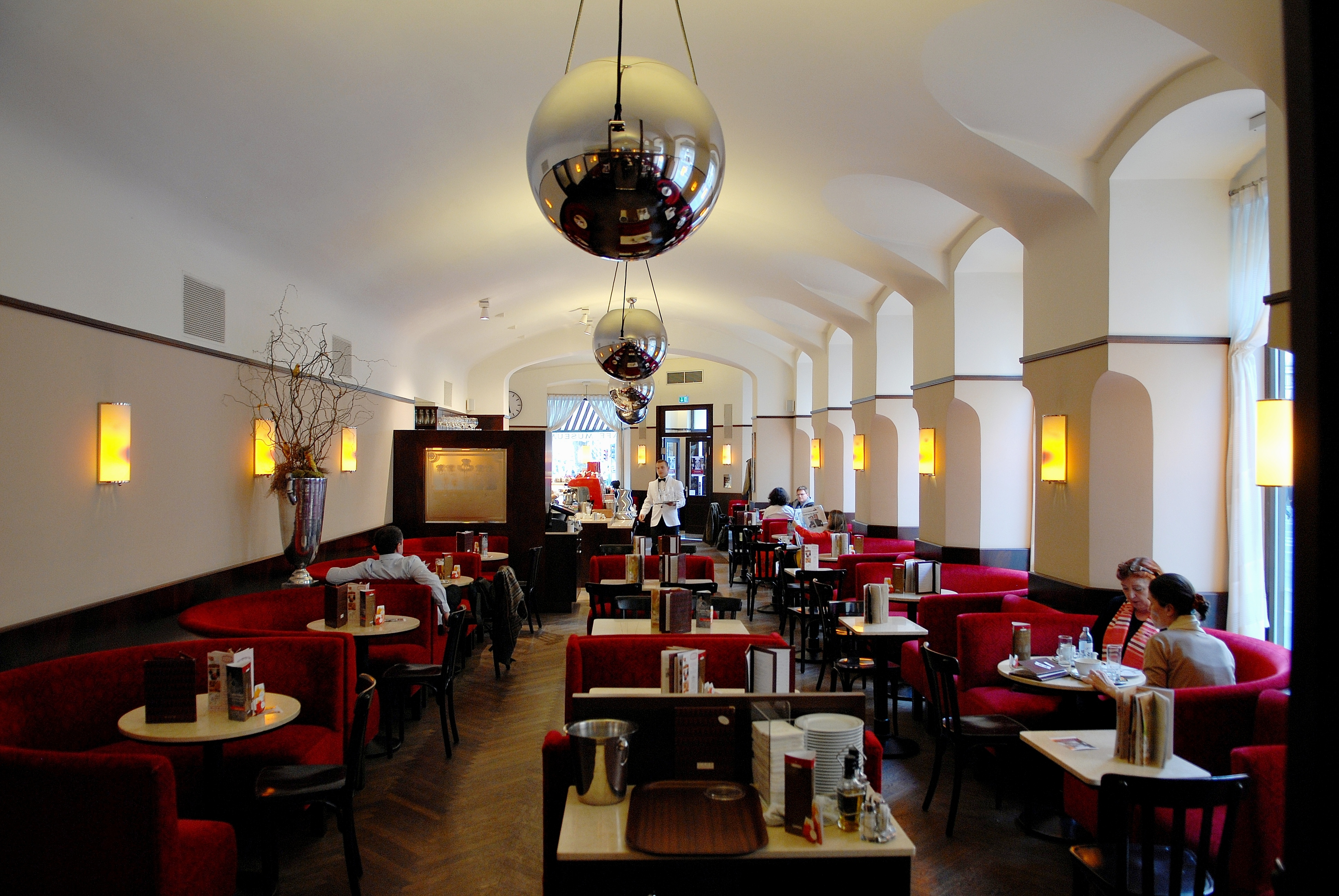
View of the interior (2012)

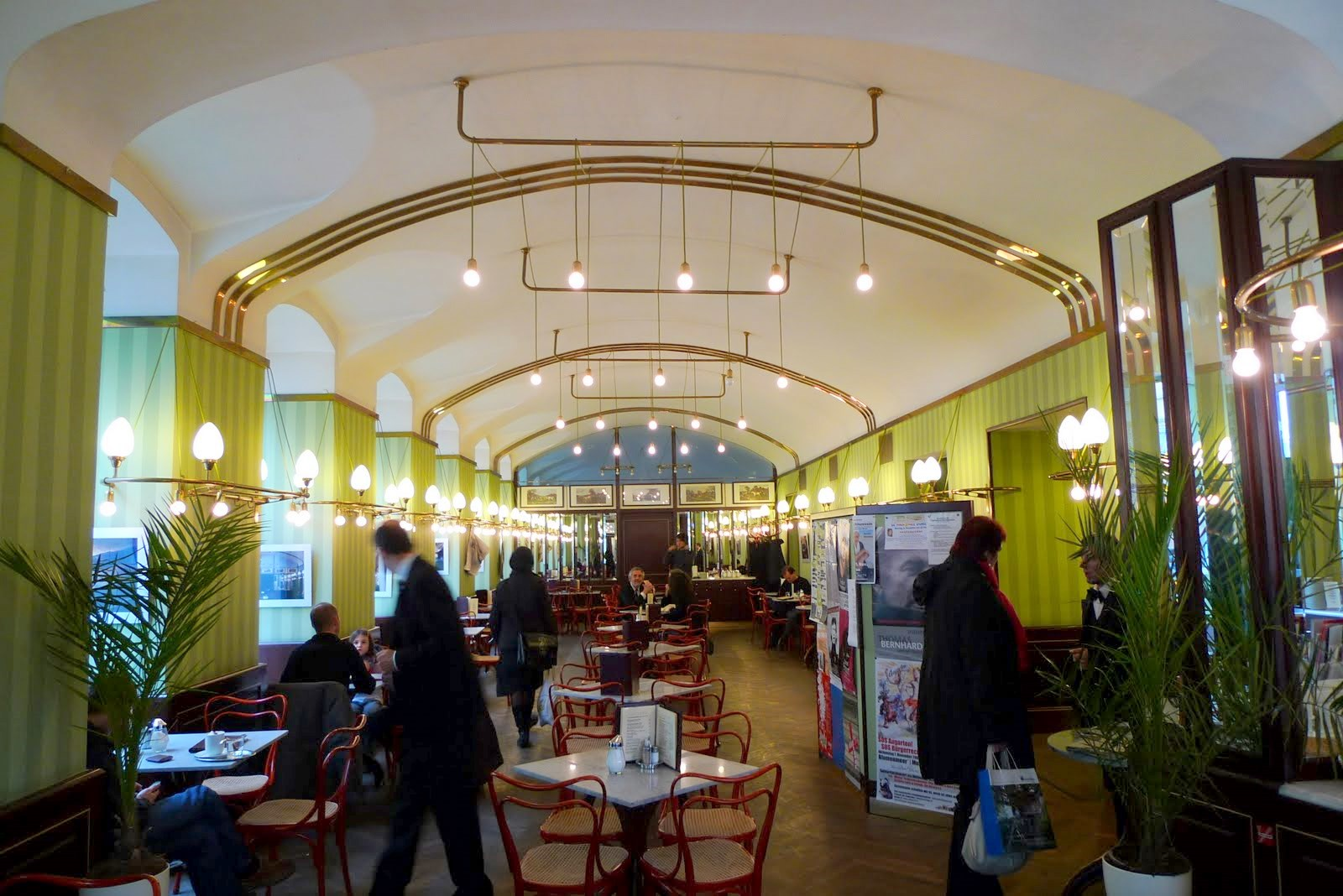
View of the interior (2009)

Café Museum is a traditional Viennese café located in the Innere Stadt first district in Vienna. The café opened in 1899. The original interior was designed by renowned architect Adolf Loos. The café became a meeting place for Viennese artists.

== Location ==
The café is situated on the ground floor of the corner Friedrichstraße 6 / Operngasse 7 in the first district in Vienna, Austria. The following places are close by: Naschmarkt, Karlsplatz, St. Charles's Church, Secession Building, Academy of Fine Arts.

== History ==
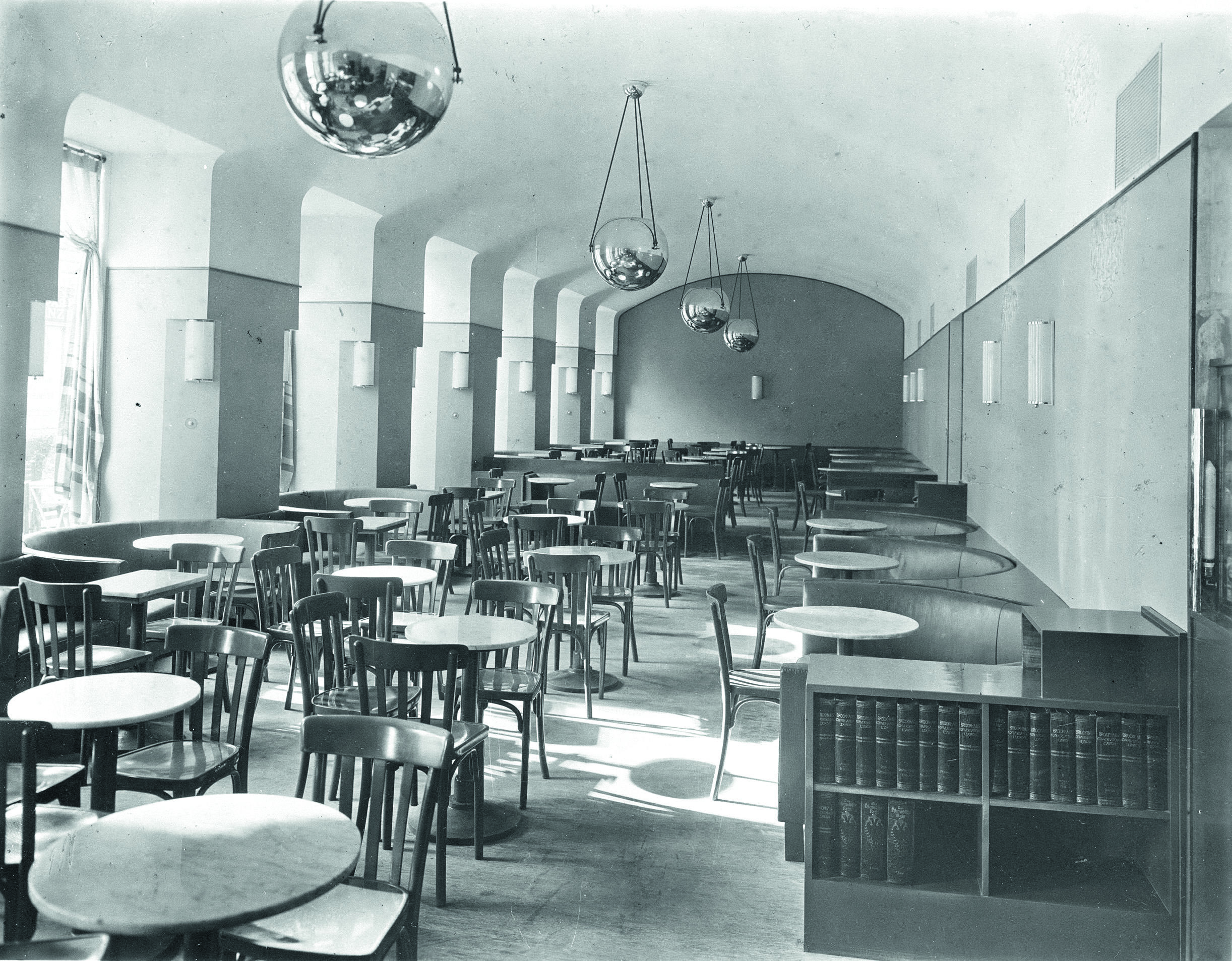
Café Museum in the 1930s (original furnishings by Josef Zotti)

Café Museum was established in a building designed in 1872 by Otto Thienemann. Ludwig Frisch, who opened the café in 1899, chose the name referring to the Café zum Museum, which is located next to Kunsthistorisches Museum.

The furnishings of the café were influenced by the simple and sober style, which was expressed with bentwood chairs made by the firm Gebrüder Thonet. In view of this, Ludwig Hevesi created the nickname Café Nihilismus (café nihilism) for the café. Even the front is held in a very simple style – nowadays you can only see the golden letters “Café Museum” on a white background.

At the beginning of the 1930s the architect Josef Zotti, a student of Josef Hoffmann, redesigned the café. He installed lodges and half-round sofas with red pleather along the walls. Hence he created a living room atmosphere that stood in contrast to the earlier design.

After the renovation in 2003, which reconstructed Loos’ original design, some of the original items made by Zotti can be found in the Viennese Imperial Furniture Collection. The Loos-reconstruction was criticized for the lack of authenticity and the uncomfortable furnishings.

The cafe was again remodeled in 2003 and no longer retains the interior as designed by Adolf Loos. At the end of 2009, Café Museum was closed until its operation was resumed by Irmgard and Berndt Querfeld in the summer of 2010.

== Details ==
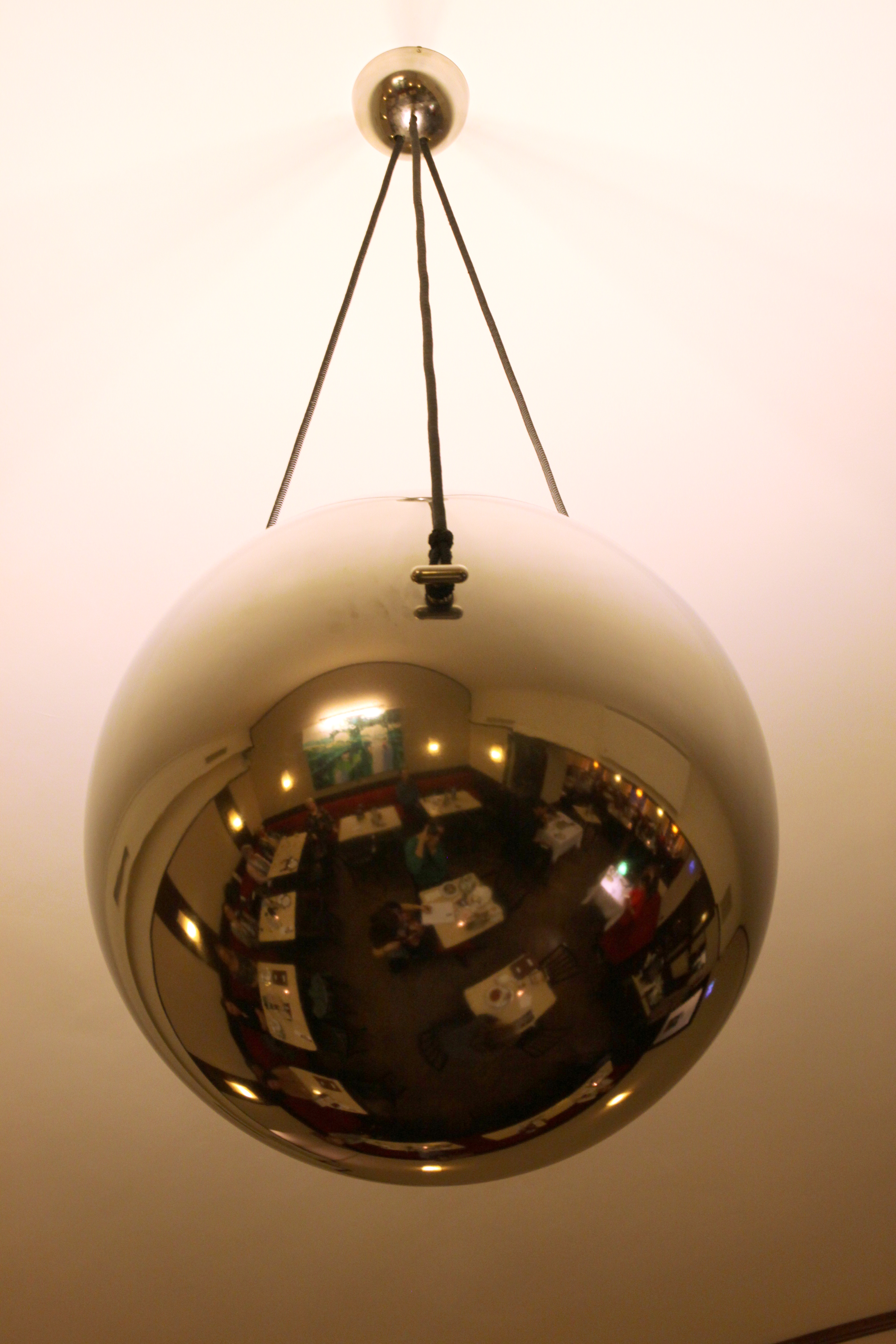
Metallic lamp in the Café Museum

=== Interior furnishing ===
Adolf Loos, architect of the café's original furnishings, had the opinion that an architect had to focus on the functional aspects and not on the artistic ones. He concentrated on a very plain design for the Café Museum, which was revolutionary in the time of its opening.

When the café was renovated in 2010, the architect Peter Schwarz followed the original design of Josef Zotti. The half-round sofas are not covered with red pleather as in the original Zotti-design but with red velvet. Also the metal lamps made out of chromium-nickel steel, which reflect the interior of the café, were restored. The light source is inside of the globe, which has an aperture at the top. The light is reflected by the smaller half globe that is attached to the ceiling above the lamp. Nowadays the café can seat 207 guests.

=== Coffee house readings ===
The Café Museum has offered regular readings since October 2011. The authors, who have held readings, include Daniel Glattauer, Christine Nöstlinger, Franzobel, Lisa Lercher, Armin Thurnher, Susanne Scholl, Gerhard Loibelsberger and Elfriede Hammerl.

== Famous guests ==
Regular guests of the café in the early twentieth century included Peter Altenberg, Joseph Schmidt, Richard Tauber, Alban Berg, Hermann Broch, Elias Canetti, Gustav Klimt, Oskar Kokoschka, Karl Kraus, Franz Lehár, Robert Musil, Leo Perutz, Joseph Roth, Roda Roda, Egon Schiele, Georg Trakl, Otto Wagner, Franz Werfel and Ernst Jandl.

== See also ==
- List of restaurants in Vienna
