= Ornament and Crime =

Essay and lecture by Adolf Loos

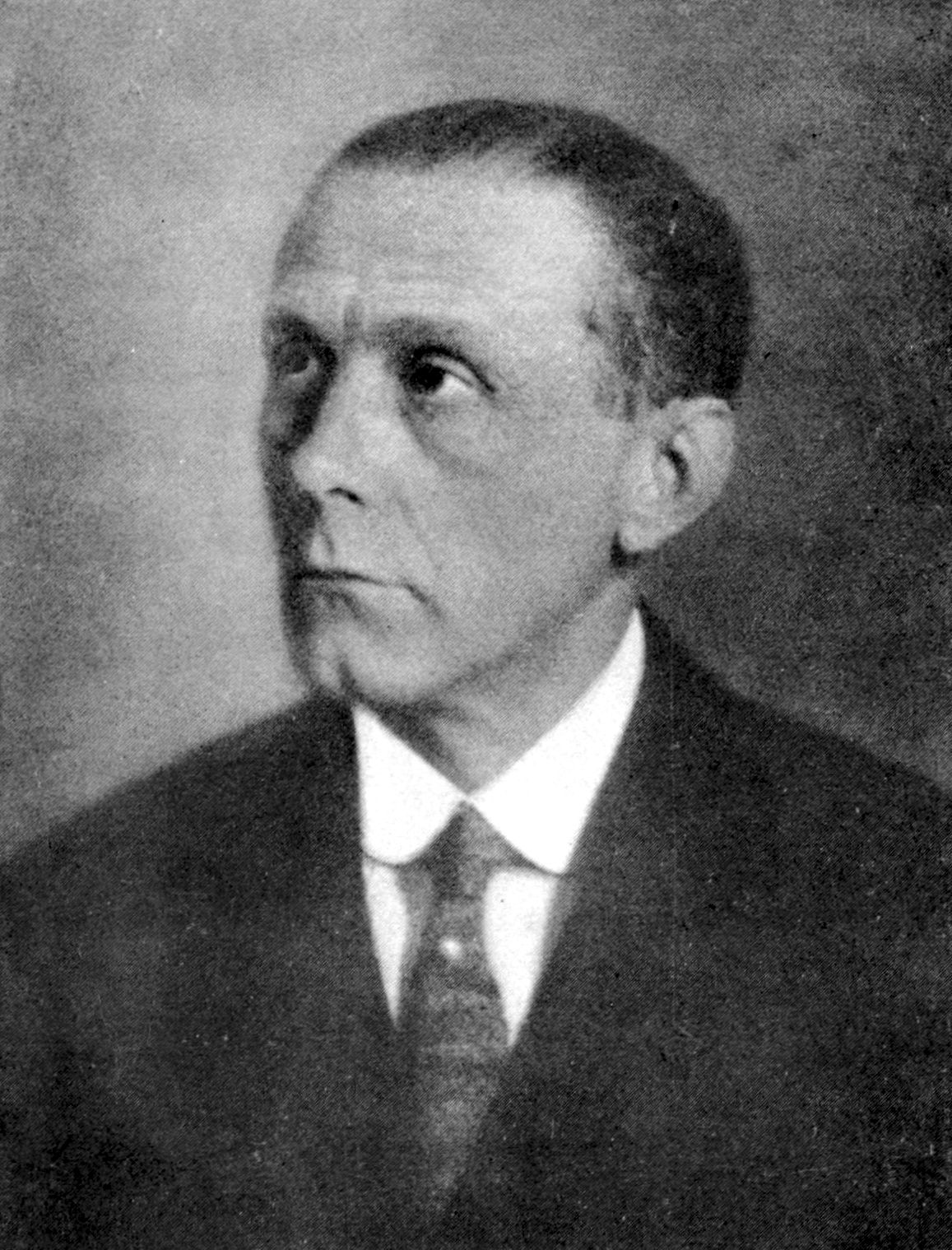
Adolf Loos

"Ornament and Crime" is an essay and lecture by modernist architect Adolf Loos that criticizes ornament in useful objects.

== History ==
Contrary to popular belief that it was composed in 1908, Adolf Loos first gave the lecture in 1910 at the Akademischer Verband für Literatur und Musik in Vienna. The essay was then published in 1913 in Les Cahiers d'aujourd'hui in French as Ornement et Crime. Only in 1929 was the essay published in German in the Frankfurter Zeitung, as Ornament und Verbrechen. It was the architect Henry Kulka, who assisted Loos during a reprint of the essay in 1931 in Trotzdem, that altered the original year to 1908 after he consulted Loos, who either didn't remember well or wanted to claim primacy in the confrontation against the Secessionists.

== Content ==
The essay was written when Art Nouveau—known as Secession in Austria and which Loos had excoriated even at its height in 1900—was showing a new way forward for modern art. The essay was important in articulating some moralizing views, inherited from the Arts and Crafts movement, which would be fundamental to the Bauhaus design studio, and would help define the ideology of modernism in architecture.

"The evolution of culture marches with the elimination of ornament from useful objects", Loos proclaimed, thus linking the optimistic sense of the linear and upward progress of cultures with the contemporary vogue for applying evolution to cultural contexts. Loos's work was prompted by regulations he encountered when he designed a building without ornamentation opposite a palace. He eventually conceded to requirements by adding window flower boxes.

In the essay, Loos explains his philosophy, describing how ornamentation can have the effect of causing objects to go out of style and thus become obsolete. It struck him that it was a crime to waste the effort needed to add ornamentation, when the ornamentation would cause the object to soon go out of style. Loos introduced a sense of the "immorality" of ornament, describing it as "degenerate", its suppression as necessary for regulating modern society. He took as one of his examples the tattooing of the "Papuan" and the intense surface decorations of the objects about him—Loos says that, in the eyes of western culture, the Papuan has not evolved to the moral and civilized circumstances of modern man, who, should he tattoo himself, would either be considered a criminal or a degenerate.

Loos never argued for the complete absence of ornamentation, but believed that it had to be appropriate to the type of material.

Loos concluded that "No ornament can any longer be made today by anyone who lives on our cultural level ... Freedom from ornament is a sign of spiritual strength".

== See also ==
- Form follows function
- Modern architecture
- Utilitarian design
