= Josef Rufer =

Austrian-born musicologist (1893 - 1985)

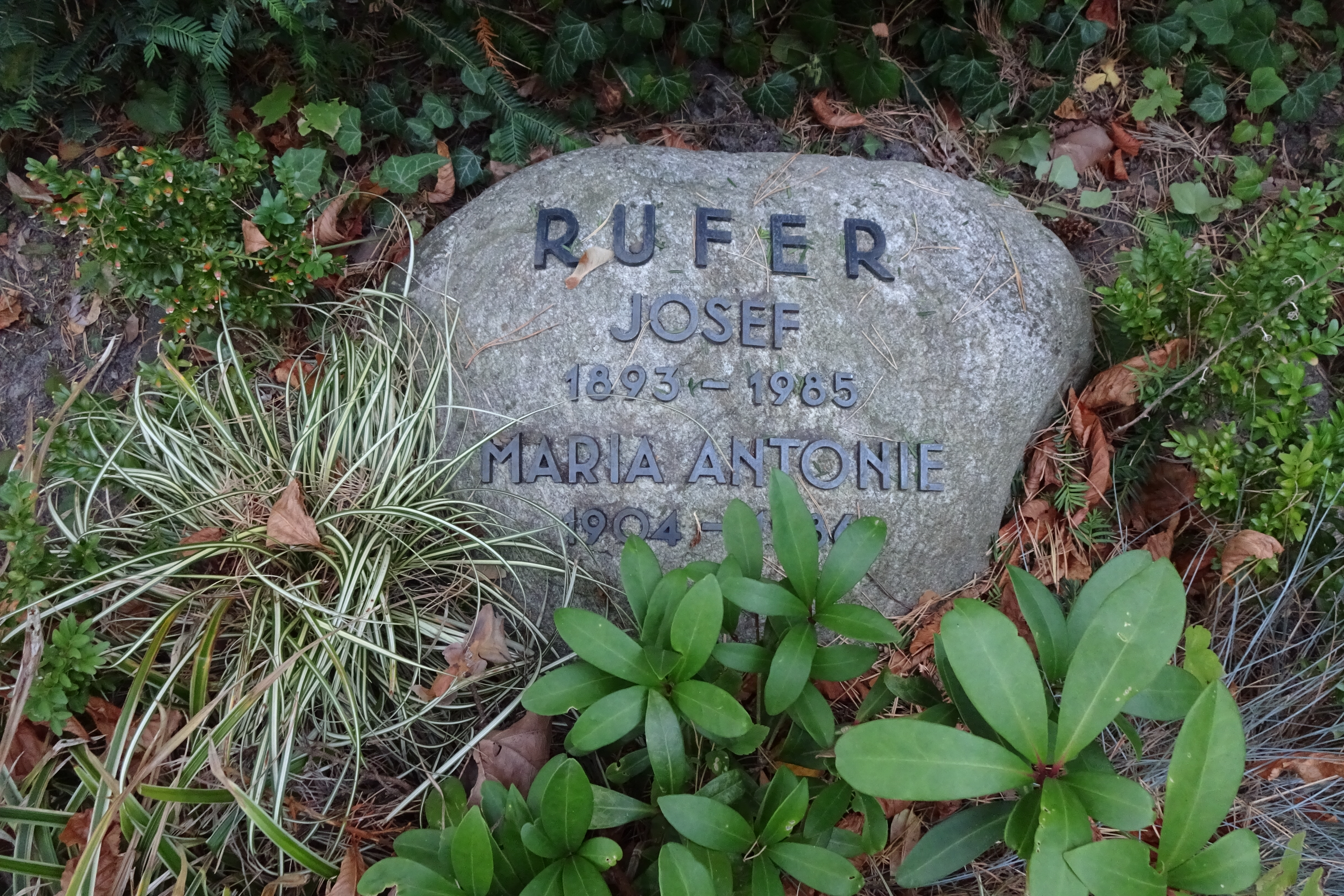
Grave of Josef Rufer in Friedhof Nikolassee in Berlin-Nikolassee.

Josef Rufer (1893–1985) was an Austrian-born musicologist. He is regarded as a significant figure mainly on account of his association with and writings on Arnold Schoenberg.

Rufer was a pupil of Alexander von Zemlinsky and Schoenberg in Vienna; when the latter composer moved to Berlin to direct the Masterclass in Composition at the Prussian Academy of Arts, Rufer went with him and operated as his Chief Assistant between 1925 and 1933.

Rufer was thus closely involved with Schoenberg during the period of development of serialism and the 12-note method. He recalled Schoenberg saying, "I have made a discovery which will ensure the supremacy of German music for the next hundred years".

Rufer's writings on Schoenberg include the introduction to the serial method Die Komposition mit Zwölf Tönen (Berlin, 1952; translated as Composition With Twelve Notes, London, 1954; reprinted 1969, ISBN 978-0-313-21236-9), and the catalogue Das Werk Arnold Schönberg's (Kassel, 1959; translated as The Works of Arnold Schoenberg, London, 1962). Both were seminal in the study of the composer and his music.

== See also ==
- Rufer House
