= Michaelerplatz =

Square in Vienna, Austria

Coordinates: 48°12′28.7″N 16°21′59.1″E

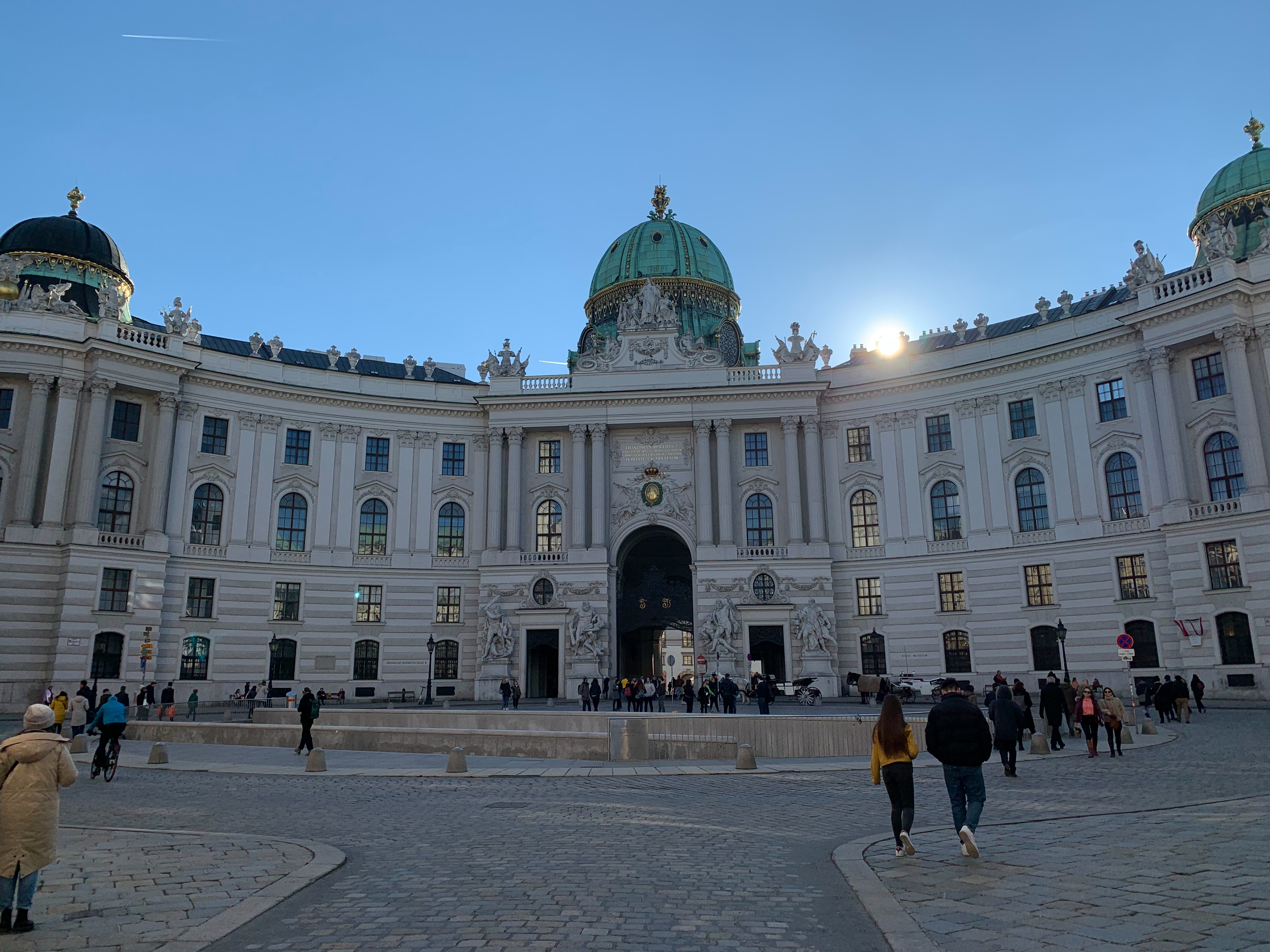
Michaelerplatz facing southwest toward the Hofburg's Michaelertrakt as planned by Fischer von Erlach the Younger

The Michaelerplatz (English: St. Michael's Square) is a major square in the center of Vienna. It is a baroque, star-shaped square that functions as the point of intersection of several inner-city streets – the Kohlmarkt, the Herrengasse, the Schauflergasse, and the Reitschulgasse – as well as the northeast entry point to the Hofburg. The square is named after St. Michael's Church, which lies on the eastern part of the Michaelerplatz.

== History ==
The history of the Michaelerplatz dates back to the time of the Roman legionary camp Vindobona. The area was located outside the camp walls, being part of the camp's civilian suburb (Canaba). Beginning in the 1st century AD, the Michaelerplatz acted as an intersection between three streets: the Limes road running along the river Danube, a trade route leading to modern St. Pölten, and a feeder road that led to the southwestern gate of Vindobona, the Porta Decumana (later known as the Peiler Gate). Four Roman houses were found on the modern Michaelerplatz, dating from the 2nd to the 5th century AD. They are presumed to have housed an entertainment quarter, including a small shop.

During the Middle Ages, the Michaelerplatz was part of the Witmarkt (Wood Market), which is now known as the Kohlmarkt. To the southwest of the Market, the new medieval city gate (the Witmarkttor) and the original part of the Hofburg palace (the § Swiss Wing) was built. In the 13th century, St. Michael's Church was built on the site of the modern Michaelerplatz. The church grounds included a cemetery as well. During the 14th century, the Hofburg was expanded, with its gardens reaching the southwestern part of the Witmarkt. In the 16th century, the Habsburgs had a Jeu de paume built on the grounds of the palace gardens, which was later converted into a theater, the Altes Burgtheater (Englisch: Old Castle Theater or Old Court Theater). By this point, the area of the modern Michaelerplatz again was an intersection of several streets (the most important among them being the Witmarkt, later known as Kohlmarkt) as well as the northwestern entrance to the Hofburg grounds. This intersection was framed by St. Michael's Church and its cemetery, by the Altes Burgtheater and the palace gardens, as well as by several burgher houses. The area then kept this role and layout for several centuries.

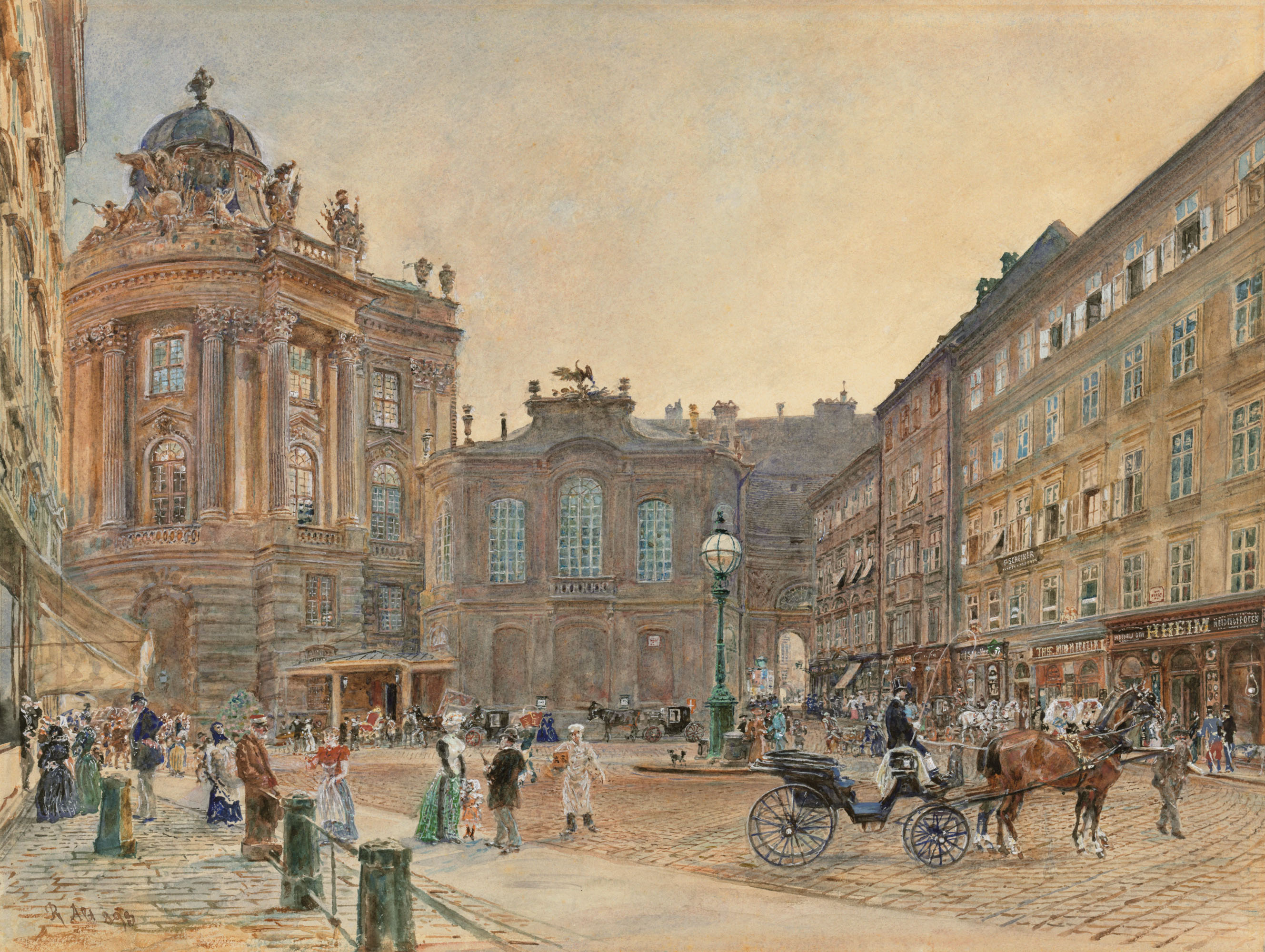
The Michaelerplatz (facing southwest) in its 18th- to 19th-century state, before the Altes Burgtheater (seen here in the center) was torn down and the Michaelertrakt finished

The modern Michaelerplatz was created in the 18th century, when architect Joseph Emanuel Fischer von Erlach submitted plans for a new baroque façade of the Hofburg facing the inner city, built on the grounds of the palace gardens. This new tract of the palace was to be named the Michaelertrakt (English: St. Michael's Wing), named after the adjacent St. Michael's Church. Construction was started, but remained unfinished until the late 19th century. The façade facing the Michaelerplatz remained unfinished, as did the Michaelertor (English: St. Michael's Gate), which was to connect the inside of the Hofburg to the Michaelerplatz. Instead, the Altes Burgtheater, which was supposed to be demolished to make room for the Michaelertrakt, was left standing. This situation would remain the status quo until the late 19th century. But even if the Michaelertrakt was not finished, the Michaelerplatz still came into existence as a square distinct from the Witmarkt/Kohlmarkt. Up until this point, the area of the Michaelerplatz had only been the southwestern part of the already existing market and did not have its own name. However, the redesign (even if it was not completely finished) created a distinguishable square of its own. By the end of the 18th century, the area was known as the Michaelerplatz.

Fischer von Erlach's plans for the Michaelerplatz were realized in the late 19th century, during the construction of the Vienna Ring Road: the Altes Burgtheater and several houses on the western part of the square were demolished, and the baroque Michaelertrakt was finished, including a fully realized Michaelertor. In 1910, the Looshaus, one of the most controversial Viennese buildings of its time, was built on the square. In 1927, the Michaelerplatz became the location of Vienna's first car roundabout, reinforcing its role as an important intersection in the inner city.

== Main sights ==
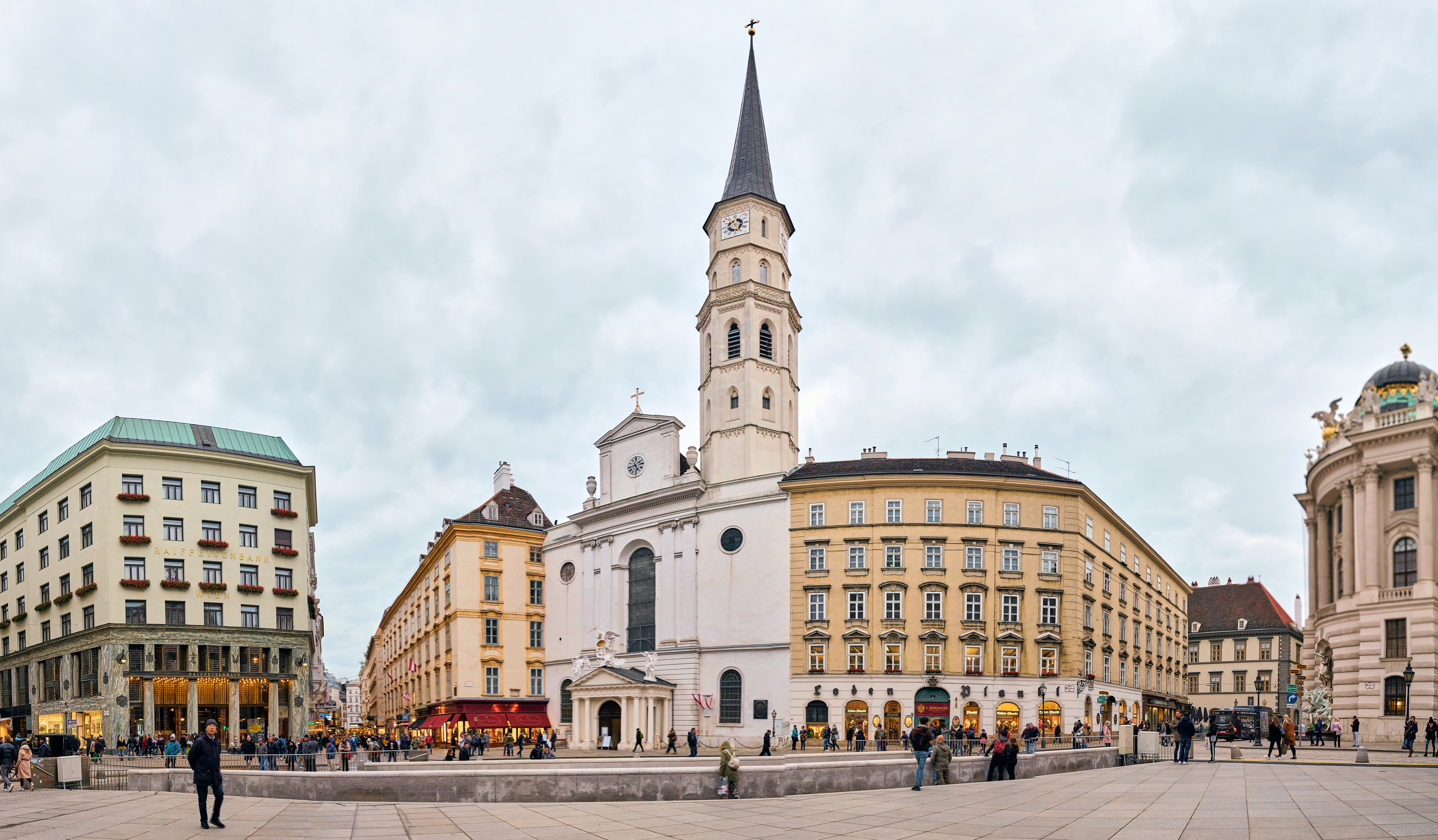
The Michaelerplatz facing east towards St. Michael's Church, with the Großes and Kleines Michaelerhaus to the left and right of the church, respectively. The Looshaus can be seen on the far left.

- Hofburg, Michaelertrakt (baroque wing of the Hofburg designed by Joseph Emanuel Fischer von Erlach)
  - Spanish Riding School
  - Sisi Museum
- St. Michael's Church (late Romanesque church with a Neoclassical façade, one of the oldest churches in Vienna)
- Looshaus (one of the most significant buildings of Viennese modernist architecture, designed by Adolf Loos)
- Palais Herberstein (Neo-Baroque palace fashioned after the Michaelertrakt, former location of the Café Griensteidl)
- § Michaelerplatz excavations (ruins of several ancient Roman houses which were part of Vindobona's civilian suburb)
- Großes Michaelerhaus (18th-century apartment building, former home of Joseph Haydn, Pietro Metastasio, and Ludwig Bösendorfer)
- Kleines Michaelerhaus (18th-century apartment building)

== Sources ==
- Richard Bösel, Christian Benedik, Kulturkreis Looshaus, Graphische Sammlung Albertina (Hrsg.): Der Michaelerplatz in Wien: Seine städtebauliche und architektonische Entwicklung (Ausstellungsführer). Kulturkreis Looshaus, Wien 1991.
- Forschungsgesellschaft Wiener Stadtarchäologie (Hrsg.): Fundort Wien: Berichte zur Archäologie Wien 2002 (darin ausführlicher Bericht über die Grabungen am Michaelerplatz).
- Christine Ranseder, Sylvia Sakl-Oberthaler et al.: Michaelerplatz. Die archäologischen Ausgrabungen, Wien Archäologisch 1. (2., überarbeitete und erweiterte Auflage, Wien 2011), ISBN 978-3-85161-046-8.
