= Looshaus =

Multi-use building in Vienna, Austria

Coordinates: 48°12′30″N 16°22′00″E

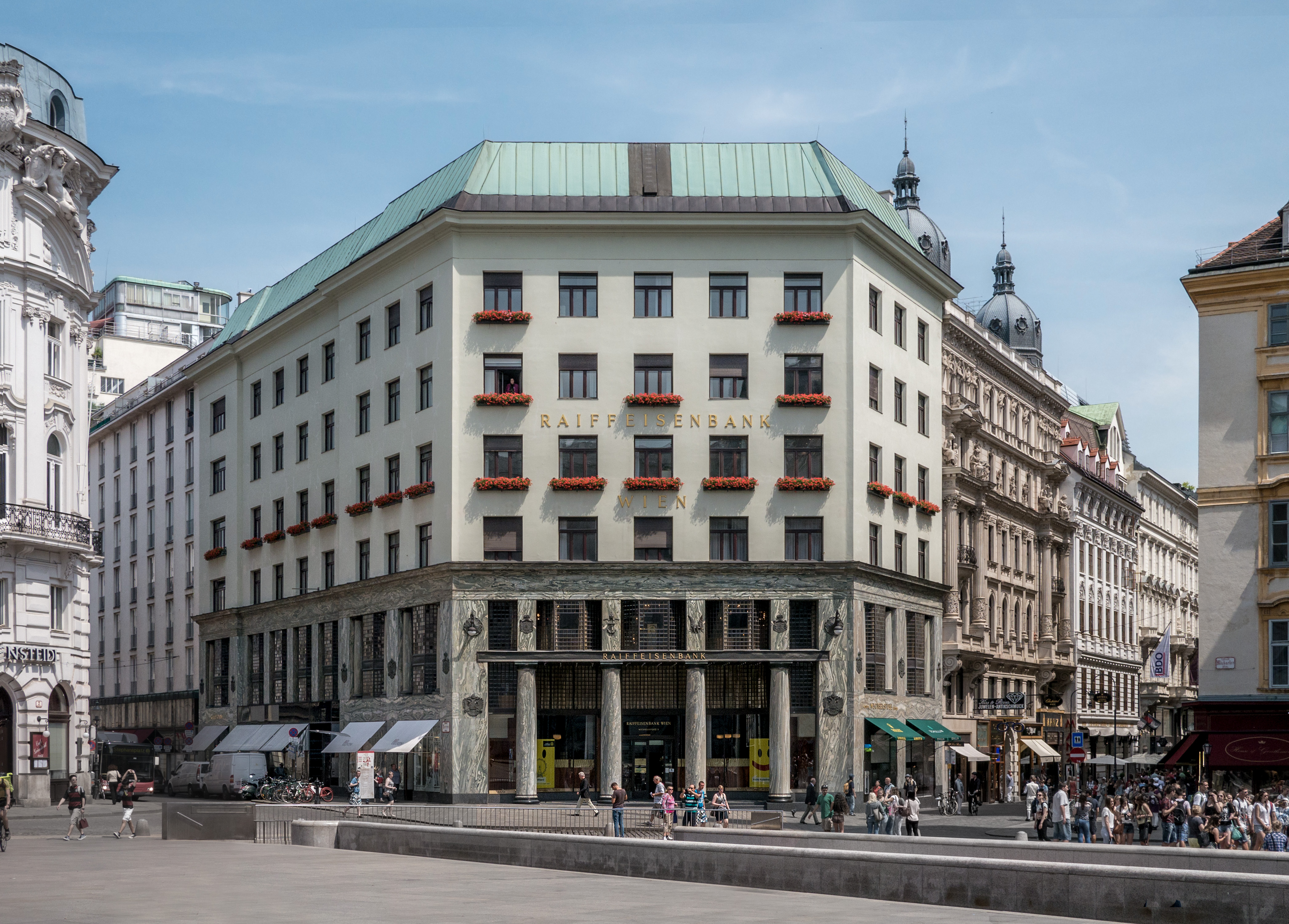
The Looshaus from Michaelerplatz

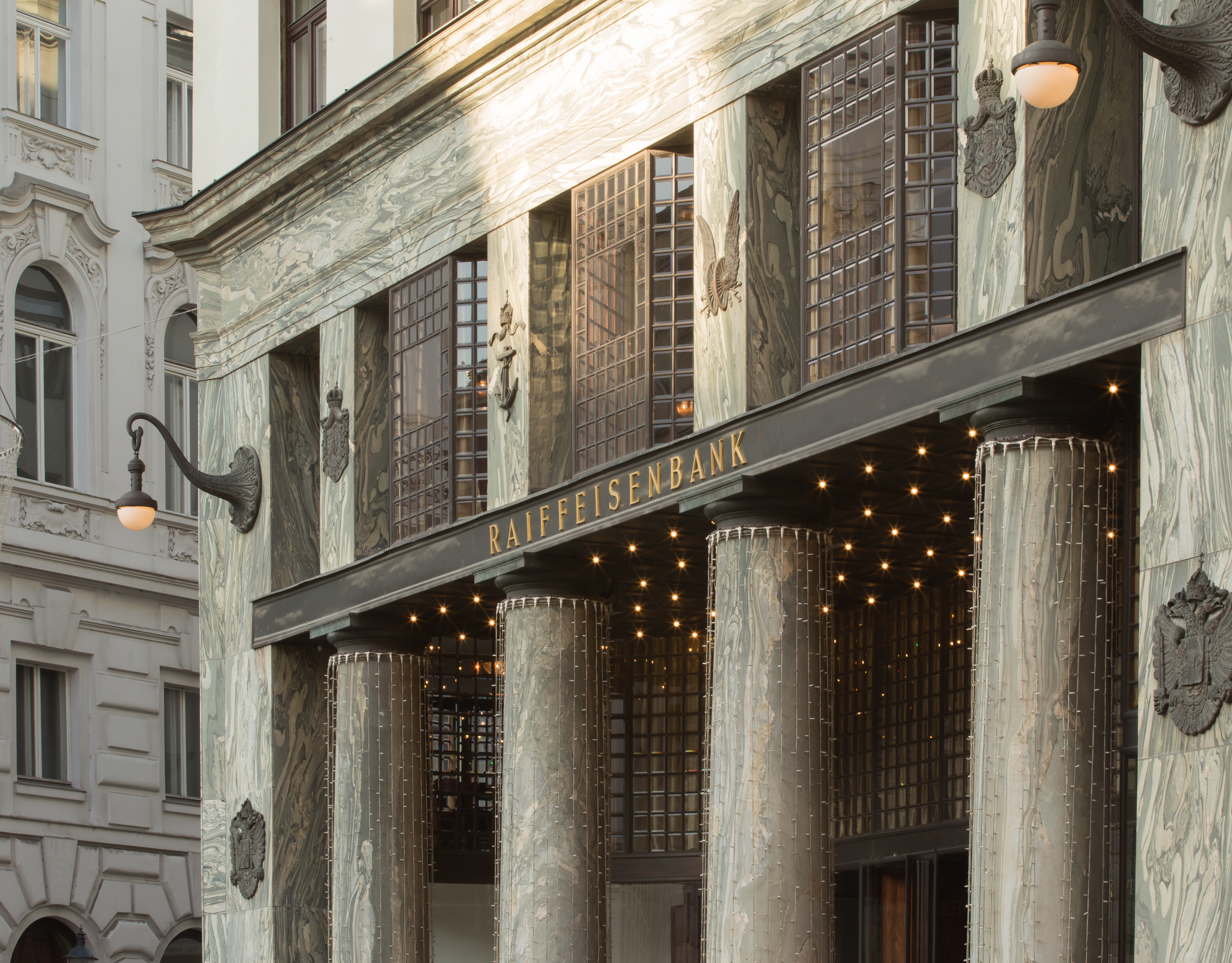
Colonnade and mezzanine bay windows

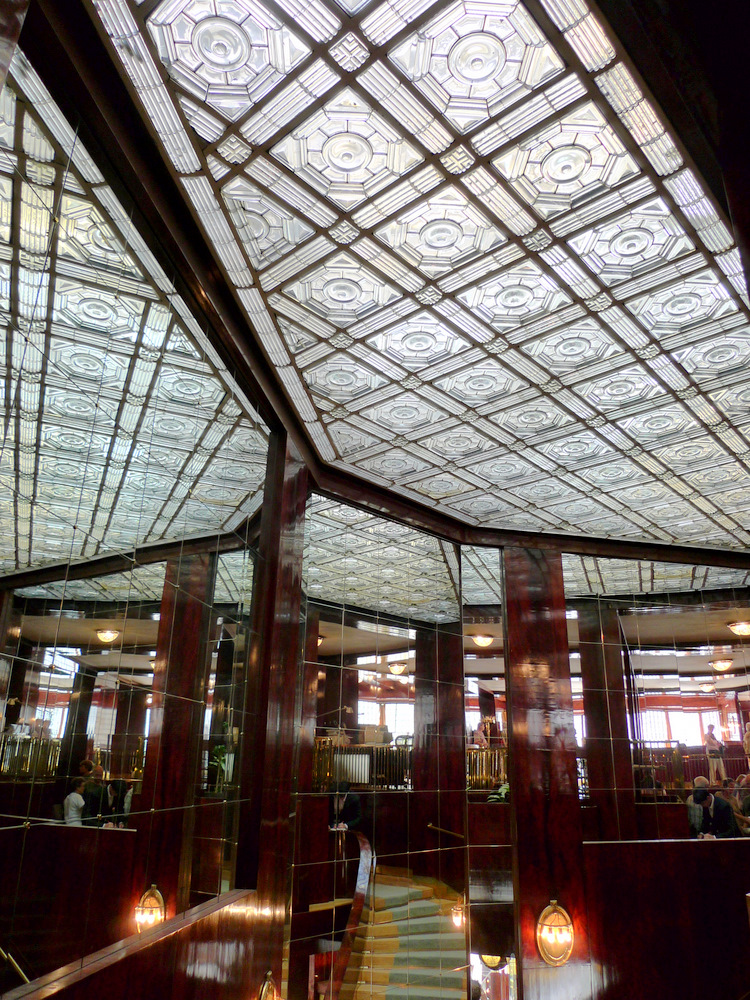
Main staircase: skylight of painted glass tiles and mirrors

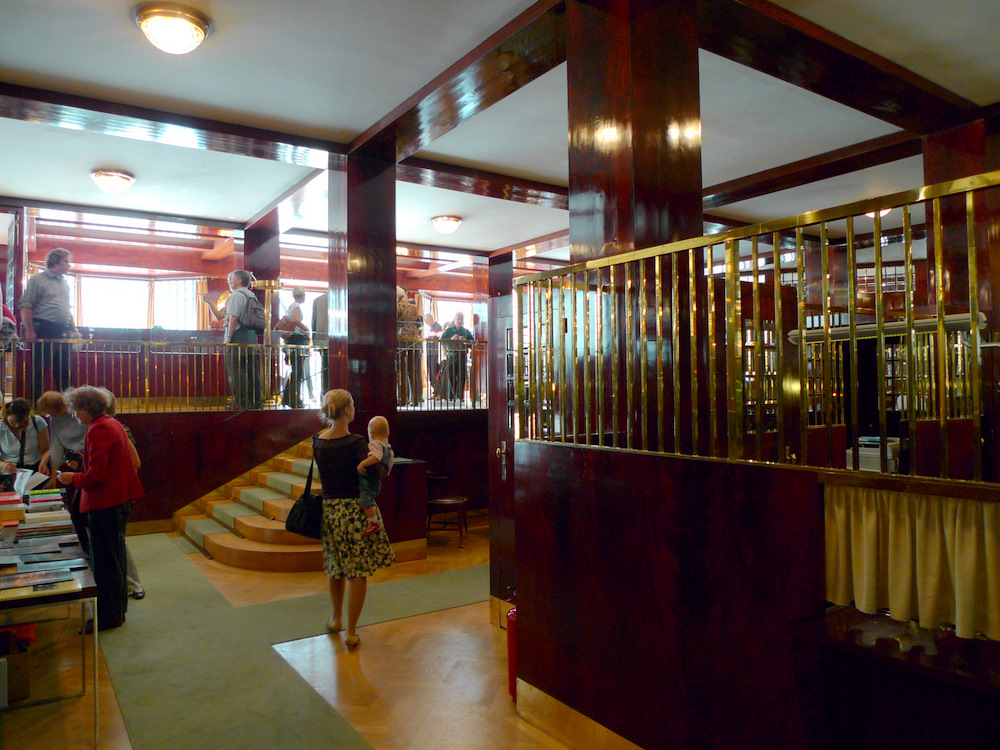
Mezzanine

The Looshaus (also known as the Goldman & Salatsch Building) is a commercial and residential building at Michaelerplatz 3, between Herrengasse and Kohlmarkt, in Vienna. Designed by Adolf Loos and completed in 1912, it is considered a major building of Viennese Modernism.

== Building ==
The modernist design of the Looshaus contrasts with both historicism and the floral ornament of Secessionist architecture. Although functionalist, it is far from purely utilitarian. In particular, it makes use of sumptuous materials. The lower, commercial section of the façade is clad in green Cipollino marble from Euboea, in striking contrast with the simple plaster of the upper, residential section. A colonnade of Tuscan columns was intended to allude to the portico of the St. Michael's Church on the same square. The upper storeys are unornamented except for window boxes; according to legend, these were intended to allude to the Hofburg by resembling the Archducal hat in form; the Looshaus is opposite its north façade (Michaelertrakt).

The Looshaus was a pioneering reinforced concrete building in Vienna; this form of construction made possible large interior spaces and rational grouping of the manufacturing and sales areas, and Loos also used varied ceiling heights to save space. The street-level salesroom was divided by four interior columns into distinct areas, and had oval display windows and furnishings sourced by Loos in England. Three mezzanine levels served by short flights of stairs housed reception and changing rooms above the main sales floor, as well as offices and the accounting department in the centre, and extending on two levels over rented commercial space on the two side streets, store rooms and work rooms for all the stages in the production of clothing. Customer areas were unified by mahogany-clad pillars, consistent marble flooring, and brass; the screened-off production areas were finished in exposed concrete. Two sets of stairs and two elevator shafts served the upper floors, including apprentice instruction and a private vocational school which shared the top floor.

== History ==
Emanuel Aufricht and Leopold Goldman, the owners of Goldman & Salatsch, a men's clothing company with an upper-class clientele, held a design competition for a building to house their sales, manufacturing, and office functions as well as Goldman's private apartment. The competition failed to produce a design that satisfied them, so in 1909 they gave the commission to Adolf Loos, who had been invited to submit a design but had not done so. The building was constructed by Pittel+Brausewetter, with Ernst Epstein as construction manager. However, although the city had accepted the plans, in 1910 the unornamented upper storeys caused a scandal; construction was permitted to proceed only after Loos added window boxes with flowers to mitigate what one of many insulting articles in the press called their "inappropriate nakedness", and defended his design in a public meeting. It was finally completed in 1912. Reportedly, Emperor Franz Joseph disliked the Looshaus so much that he ordered the curtains on the windows of the Hofburg Palace facing the square to remain closed. Before window boxes were added, one newspaper described the building as a "dung heap". Loos defended his design in a series of public lectures.

Under the Nazis, the commercial levels of the Looshaus were converted into an Opel showroom. In 1944 the building was affected by a bomb strike on an adjacent building. In 1947 it became a protected monument; it was somewhat unsuccessfully restored in the 1950s and in the 1960s housed a furniture shop. In 1987 the Raiffeisenbank bought it and thoroughly renovated it, restoring the commercial levels to their original appearance. The renovation was carried out under the direction of the architect, publicist and Loos researcher Burkhardt Rukschcio. In the process, the public area of the house in particular (the former Goldman & Salatsch business premises) was restored to its former state, which had been lost in the 1930s, and the upper floors were adapted as office space. This renovation was completed in October 1990. As early as 1989, the Looshaus was the venue, alongside the Albertina and the Wien Museum, for the exhibition "Adolf Loos" (02.12.1989–25.02.1990), which was also curated by Burkhardt Rukschcio.

In the early 2000s, Designzone Looshaus, a facility designed by Paolo Piva for exhibitions and conferences showcasing Austrian design, opened in the basement of the Looshaus. The winners of the biennial Adolf Loos Staatspreis Design are exhibited there.

In 2022, Rudolf Klingohr produced a TV documentary "Das Looshaus - Die Rettung eines Baujuwels" (The Looshaus - The Rescue of an Architectural Jewel), which once again summarised the history of the conversion in detail.

== Photo gallery ==
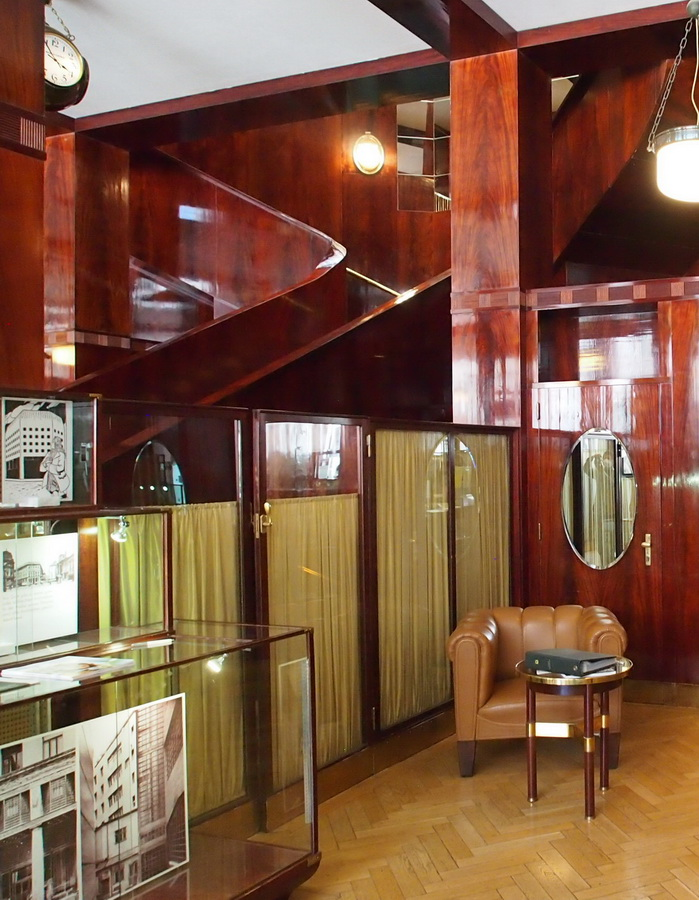
Interior view after renovation ground floor 1990s

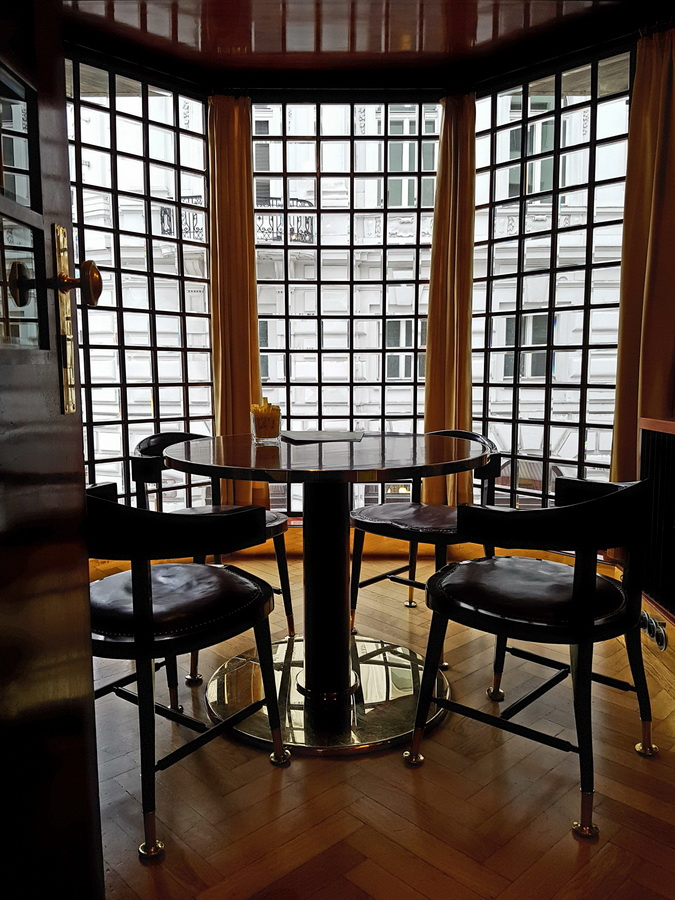
Interior Looshaus Meeting corner on the 1st floor 1990s

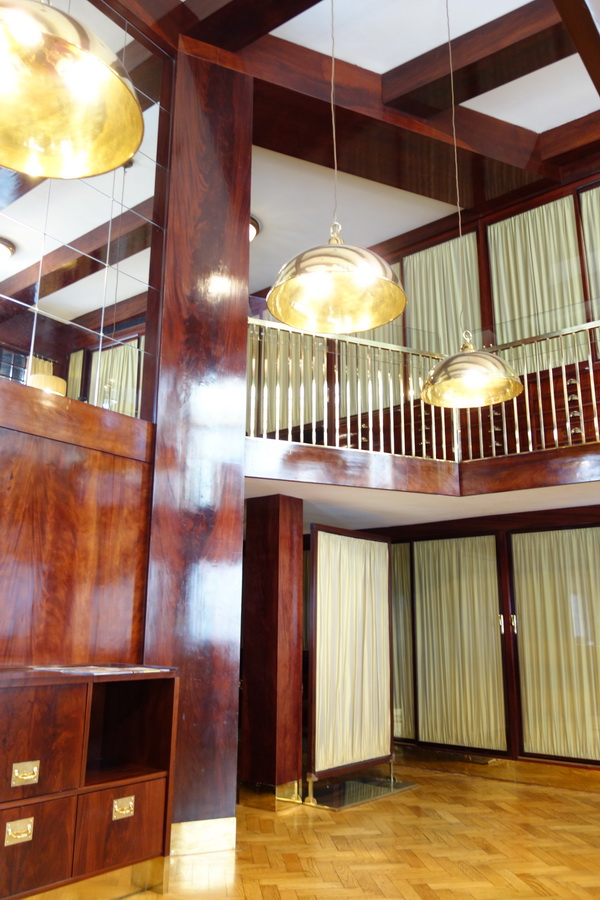
Interior Looshaus Ground floor/1st floor 1990s

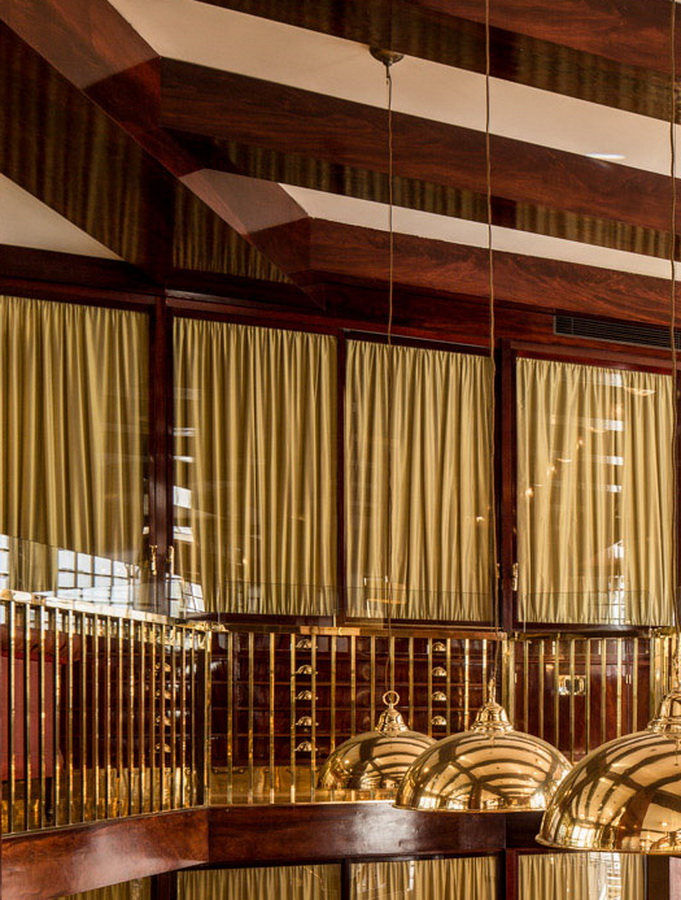
Interior Looshaus 1st floor 1990s

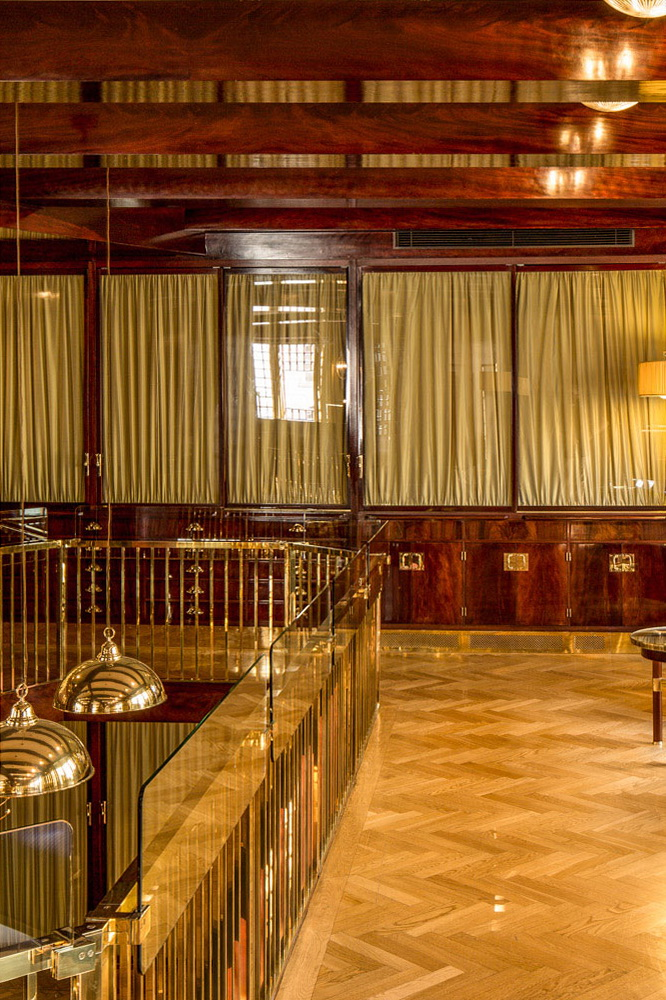
Interior Looshaus 1st floor 1990s

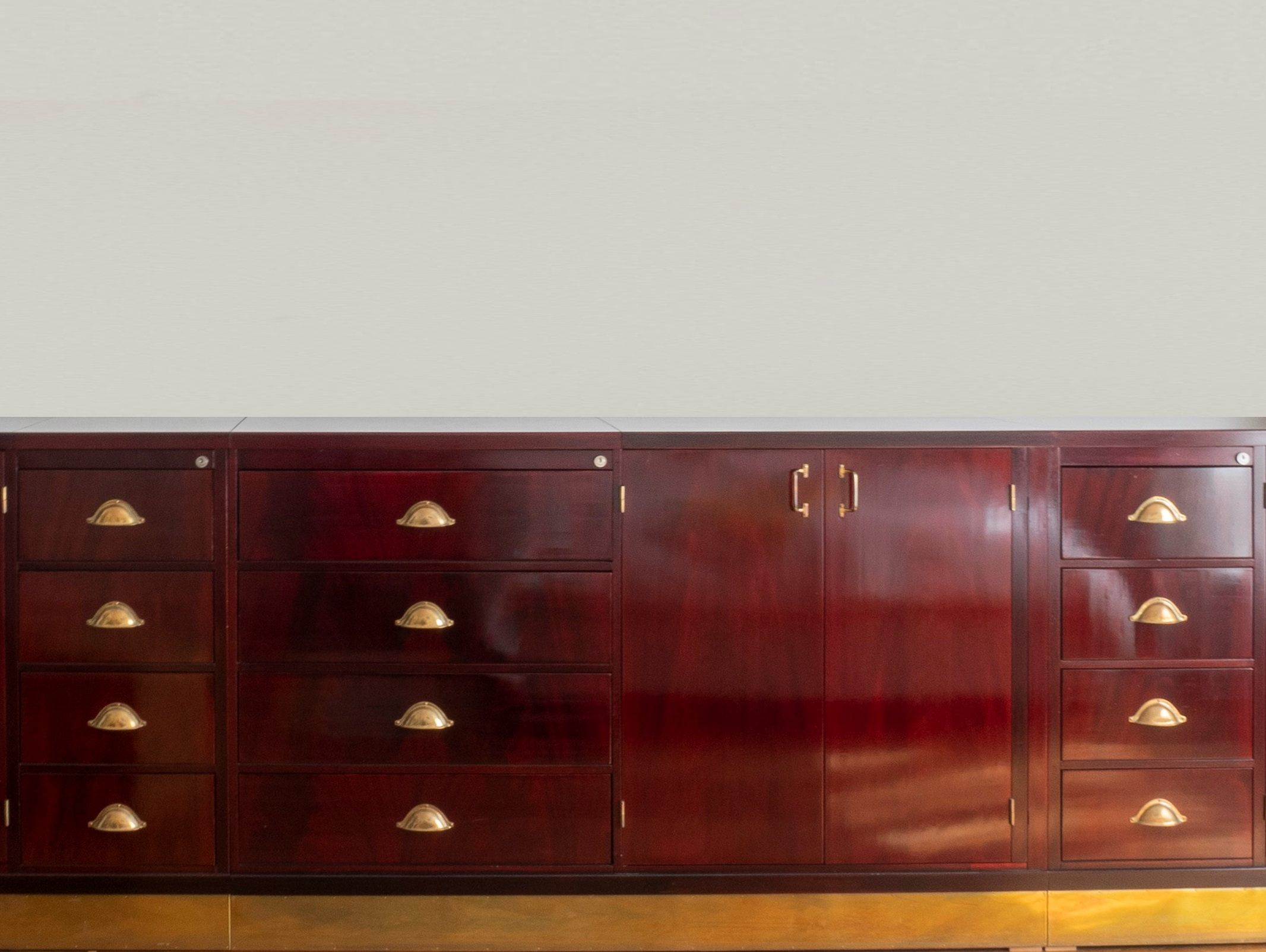
Interior Looshaus Counter cupboard detail
