= Kohlmarkt, Vienna =

Shopping street in Vienna, Austria

Coordinates: 48°12′31.7″N 16°22′3.7″E

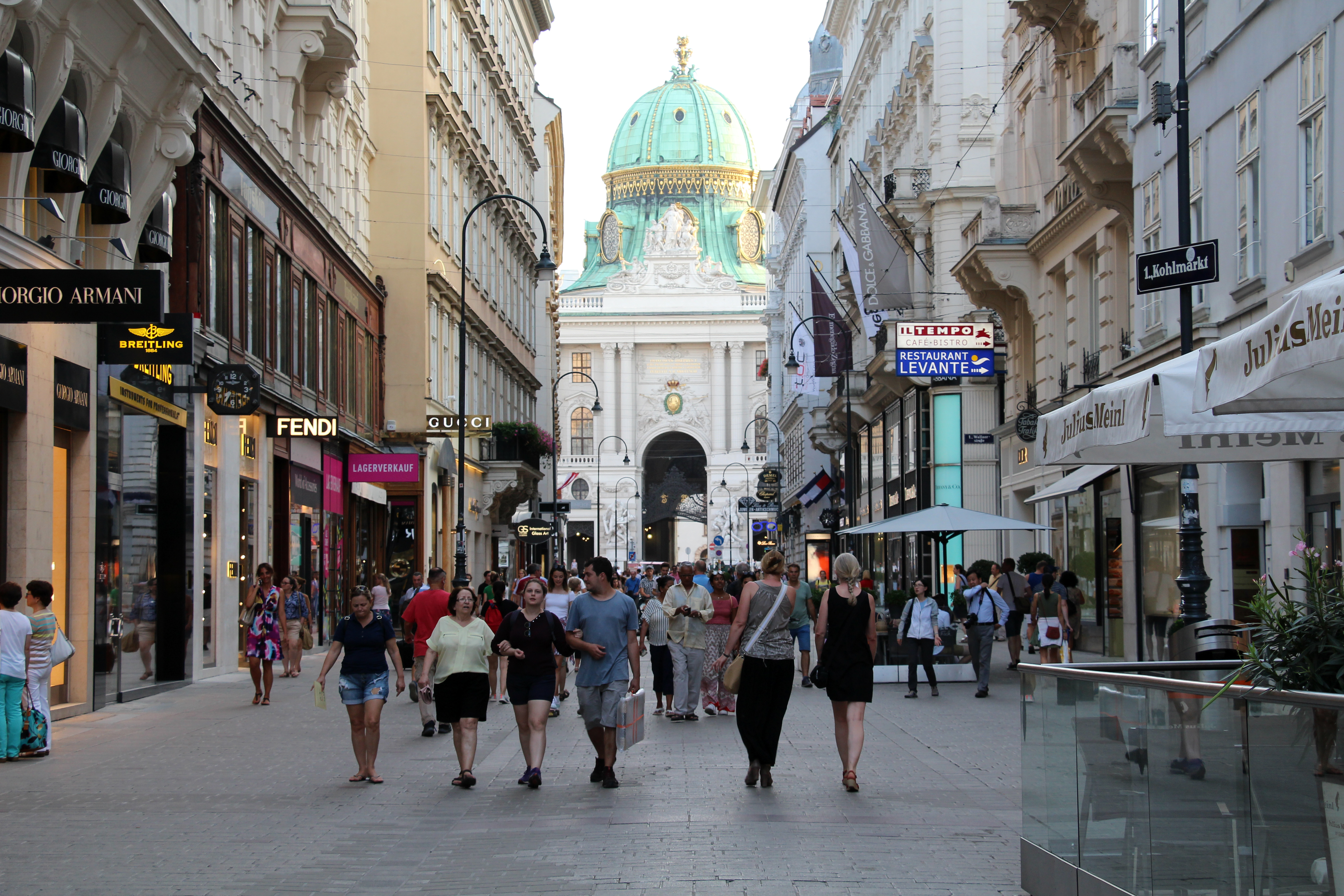
The Kohlmarkt facing southwest toward the Michaelerplatz

The Kohlmarkt (English: Coal Market) is one of the most famous streets in the center of Vienna. It stretches from Michaelerplatz to the Graben. The street is considered to be Vienna's luxury shopping street due to a high density of jewelers and branches of international fashion labels. Together with the Graben and the Kärntner Straße, the Kohlmarkt forms Vienna's so-called "Golden U" of inner-city shopping streets, which offer upscale stores and are pedestrian zones.

== History ==
The history of the Kohlmarkt dates back to the time of the Roman legionary camp Vindobona. The southwestern gate of Vindobona, the Porta Decumana (later known as the Peiler Gate), which was located at the intersection of the modern Graben and the Tuchlauben and led to the Limes road, could be reached via the Kohlmarkt. The Kohlmarkt led southwest from the Porta Decumana, connecting the gate to the Limes road.

By 1255, the street was known as the Witmarkt (Wood Market). When a new city gate was built to the southwest of the market during the 13th century, it was named the Witmarkttor (Wood Market Gate). The name Witmarkt fell out of use during the 14th century, with the street now being mentioned by the name Kohlenmarkt (Coal Market), named after its many charcoal merchants. After the construction of the Hofburg, the palace of the Habsburg emperors, the proximity of the coal market to the imperial residence favored the settling of producers and sellers of high-quality and luxurious goods instead. Over time, the Kohlmarkt transformed into a highly representative shopping and processional street. Still, the old name was kept, eventually transforming into the moniker Kohlmarkt (English: Cabbage Market) – effectively a misnomer, since the market has never been noted for its sale of cabbages.

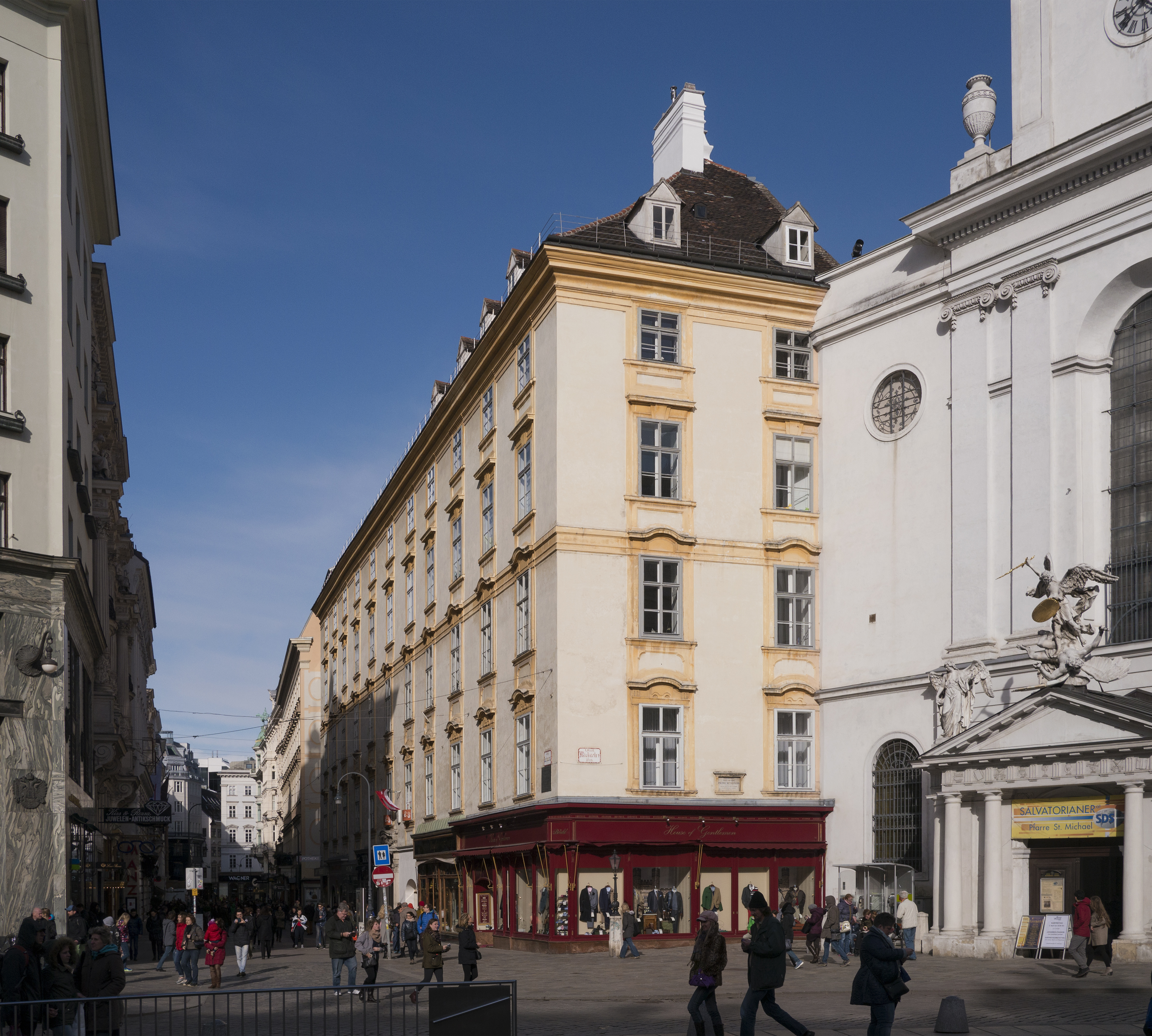
Großes Michaelerhaus, former home of Joseph Haydn, Pietro Metastasio, and Ludwig Bösendorfer

After becoming a highly representative street, the Kohlmarkt would be home to several important cultural figures. In the 18th century, composer Joseph Haydn spent several years living in the street while working as an accompanying musician for singing lessons and dances. Poet Pietro Metastasio and piano manufacturer Ludwig Bösendorfer lived and died in the same house over 100 years apart. During his time in Vienna from 1830 to 1831, Frédéric Chopin lived at Kohlmarkt as well.

The Kohlmarkt is and has been the location of several high-end stores and former royal warrant holders over time, including warrant holders such as the pastry shop and chocolaterie Demel, the tobacco store Mohilla, the bookshop Manz, and the jeweler Rozet & Fischmeister. However, with the end of the Habsburg monarchy as well as with increasing competition and rising rents, many traditional businesses have been forced to close their stores. In their place, several international luxury brands have moved in. With an average rent of €4,620 (as of 2016), the Kohlmarkt is the seventh-most expensive street for business owners in Europe and the most expensive in Austria.

In 1989, the Kohlmarkt became a pedestrian zone during the pedestrianization of the adjacent Graben, which took place in stages during the 1970s and 1980s. One of the later stages of the Graben's pedestrianization included the Kohlmarkt as well, which led to the redesign of the street.

== Main sights ==
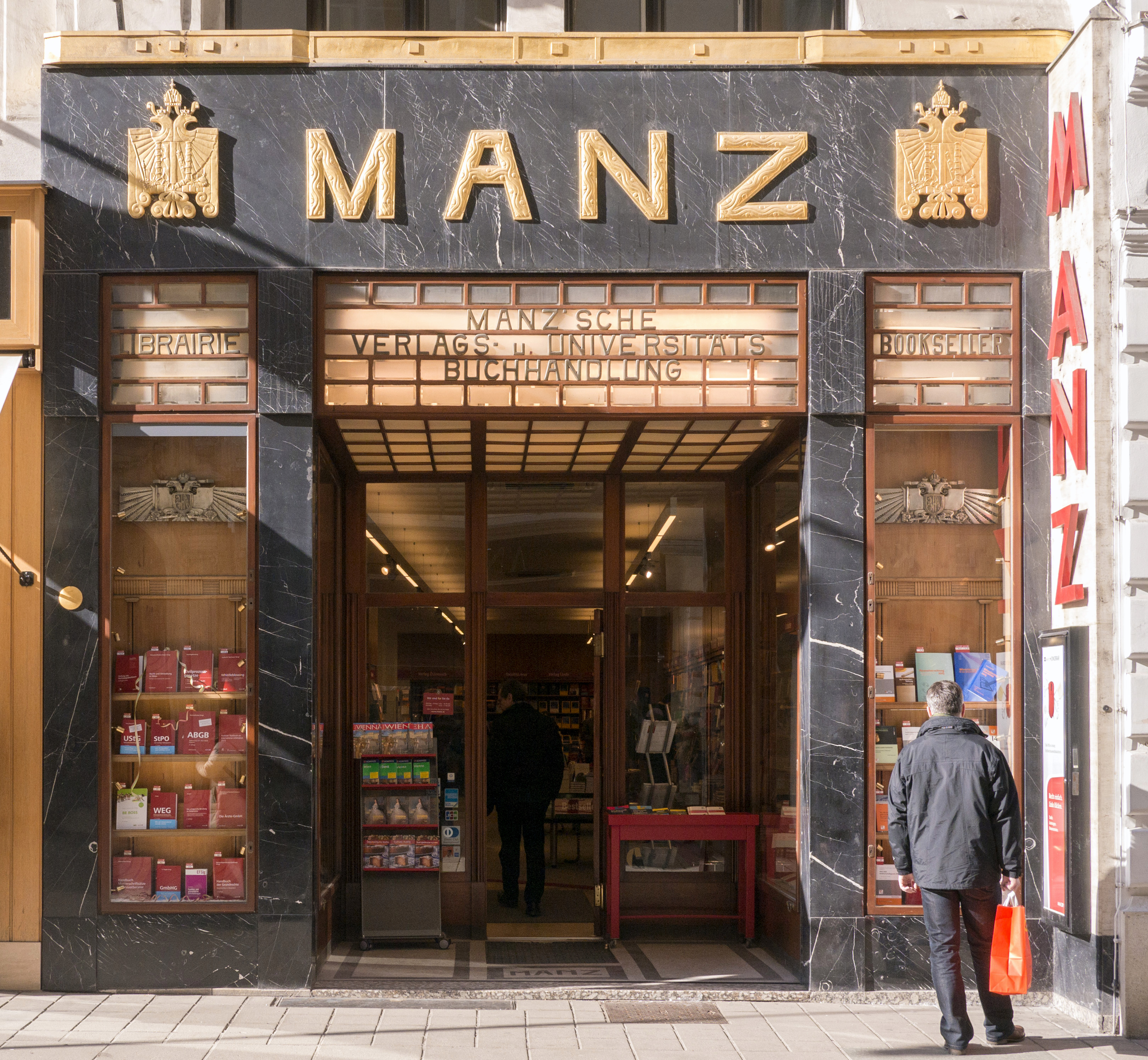
Portal of the Manz'sche Verlags- und Universitätsbuchhandlung designed by Adolf Loos

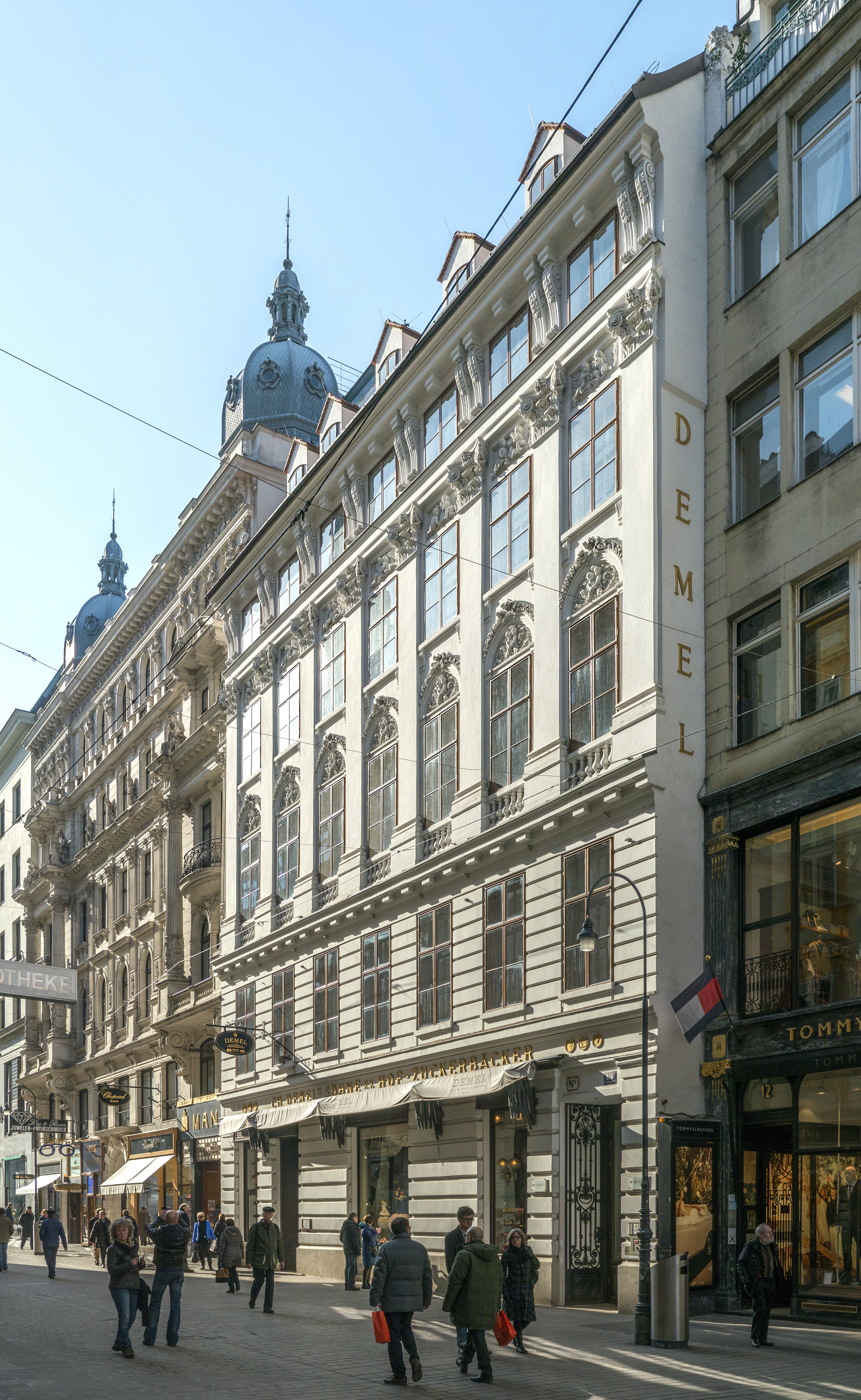
Palais Blankenstein

- Several buildings (partially) designed by Adolf Loos, including:
  - Looshaus (one of the most significant buildings of Viennese modernist architecture)
  - Manz'sche Verlags- und Universitätsbuchhandlung (portal designed by Adolf Loos)
- Palais Blankenstein (Neoclassicist palace)
- Demel (pastry shop and chocolaterie, former supplier to the royal court)
- Artaria-Haus (Art Nouveau building)
- Großes Michaelerhaus (18th-century apartment building, former home of Joseph Haydn, Pietro Metastasio, and Ludwig Bösendorfer)
- Husarenhaus (with a life-size bronze statue of a Hussar on the roof)
- Former department store Pollak (with ornaments designed by Koloman Moser)

== Sources ==
- Felix Czeike: Historisches Lexikon Wien, Band 3. Kremayr & Scheriau, Wien 1994. ISBN 3-218-00545-0
- Reinhard Engel: Luxus aus Wien I. Czernin Verlag, Wien 2001. ISBN 3-7076-0121-8
