= Café Griensteidl =

Viennese café in Vienna, Austria

Coordinates: 48°12′30″N 16°21′58″E

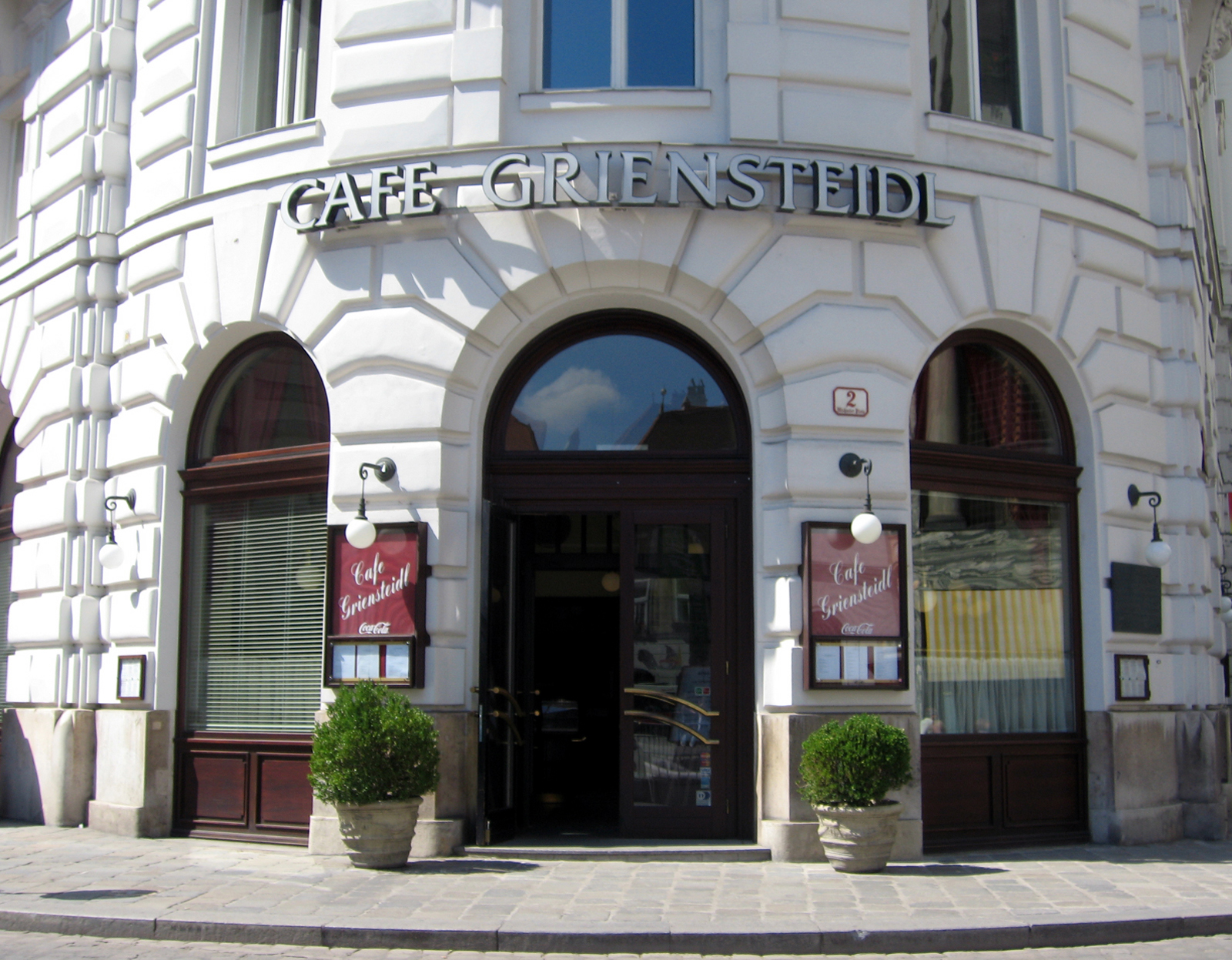
Café Griensteidl in Vienna, Austria (2007)

Café Griensteidl was a traditional Viennese café located at Michaelerplatz 2 across from St. Michael's Church and St. Michael's Gate at the Hofburg Palace in the Innere Stadt first district of Vienna, Austria. The café was founded in 1847 by former pharmacist Heinrich Griensteidl. In January 1897, the original building was demolished during the course of the renovation of Michaelerplatz. In autumn 1898, it was succeeded by the Café Glattauer. During the early twentieth century, the café was frequented by many artists, musicians, and writers, including Hugo von Hofmannsthal, Arthur Schnitzler, Arnold Schoenberg, Alexander Zemlinsky, Hermann Bahr, Friedrich Eckstein, Rudolf Steiner, Hugo Wolf, and Stefan Zweig.

In 1990, the café was reopened as Griensteidl again and became a popular location among the Viennese coffeehouse culture. But the owners closed in June 2017, citing rising rents.

== Gallery ==
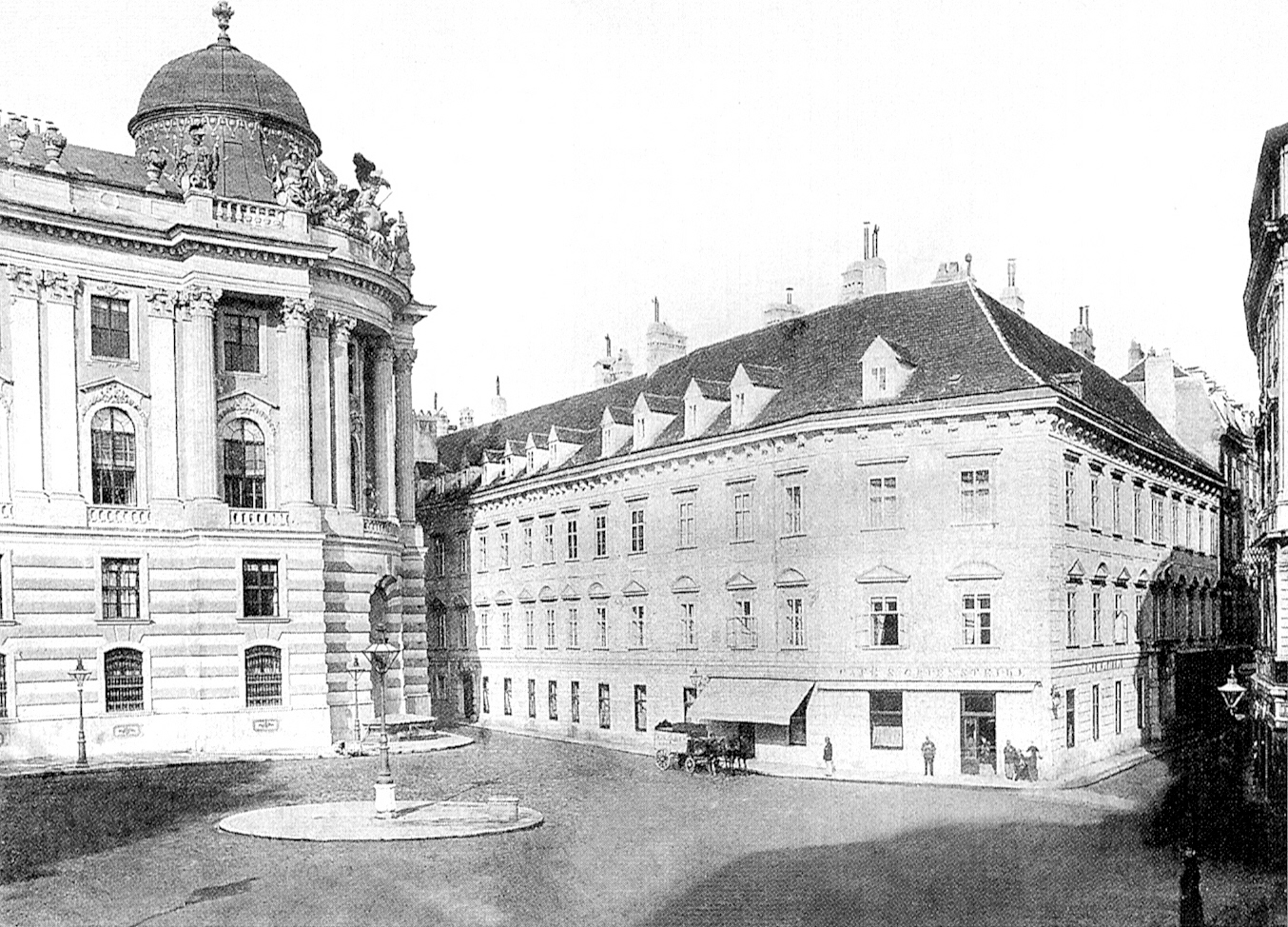
Old Café Griensteidl, before 1897

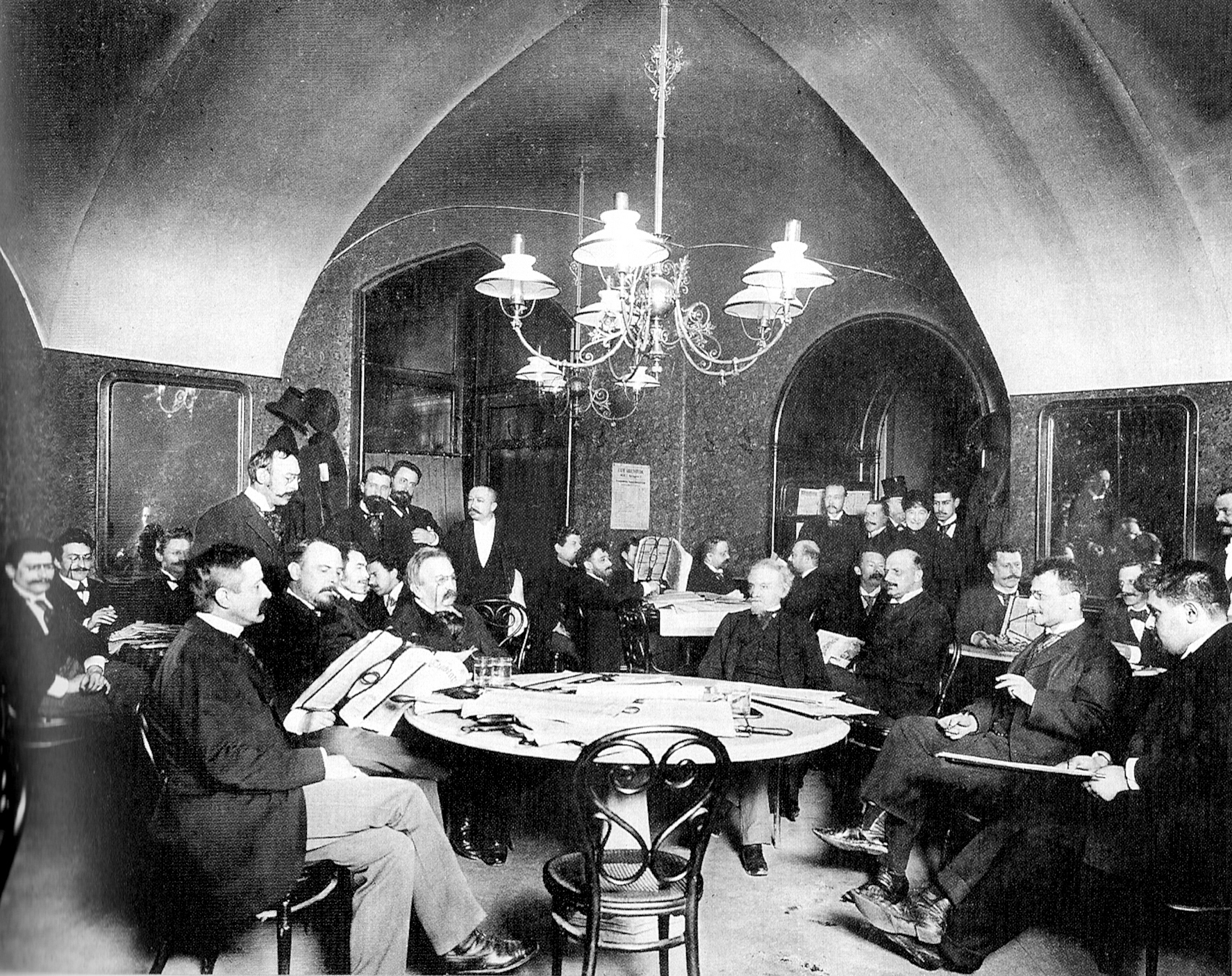
Old Café Griensteidl interior, before 1897

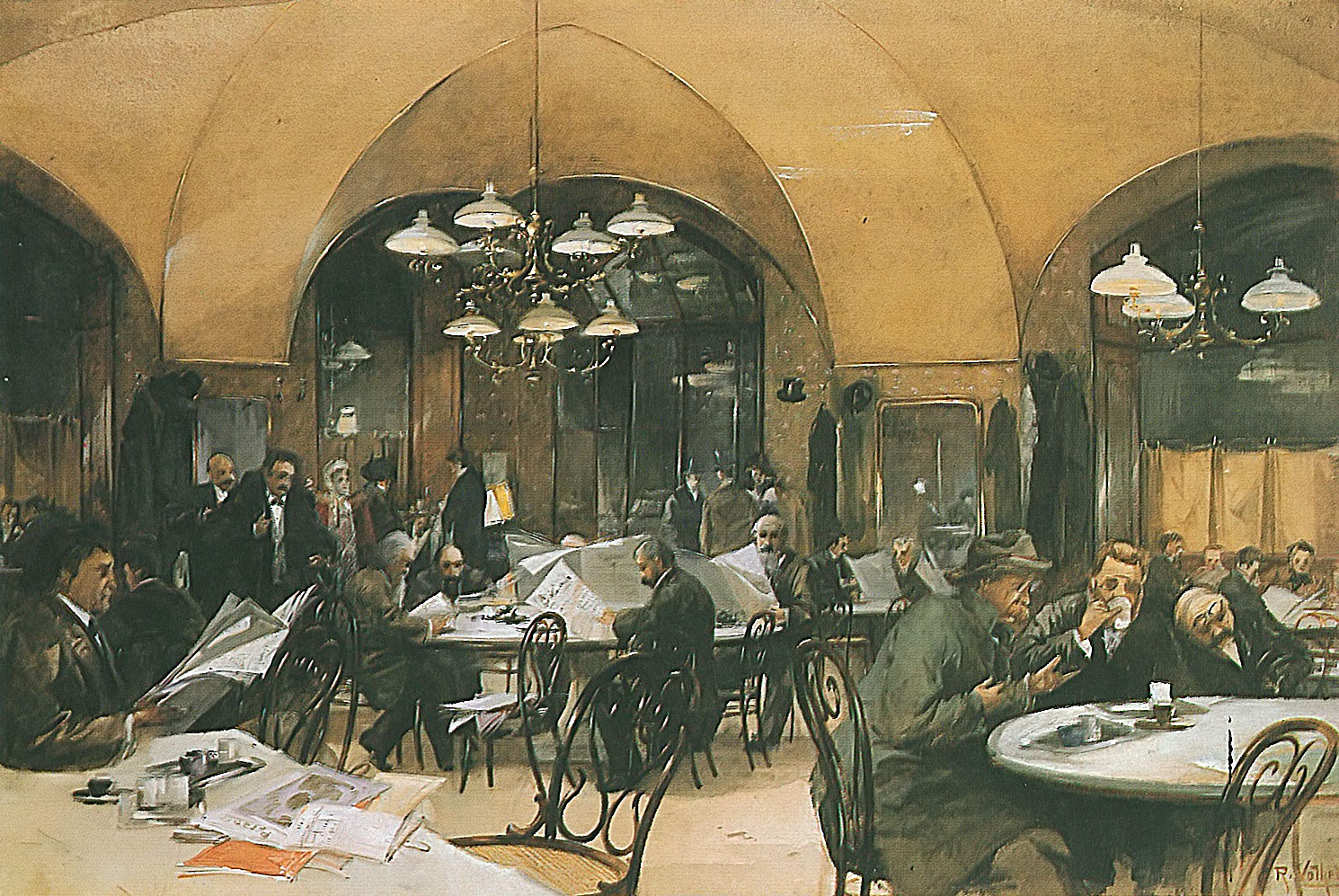
Café Griensteidl, printing by Reinhold Völkel, 1896

== See also ==
- List of restaurants in Vienna
