= Wiener Moderne =

Culture of Vienna in the period between 1890 and 1910

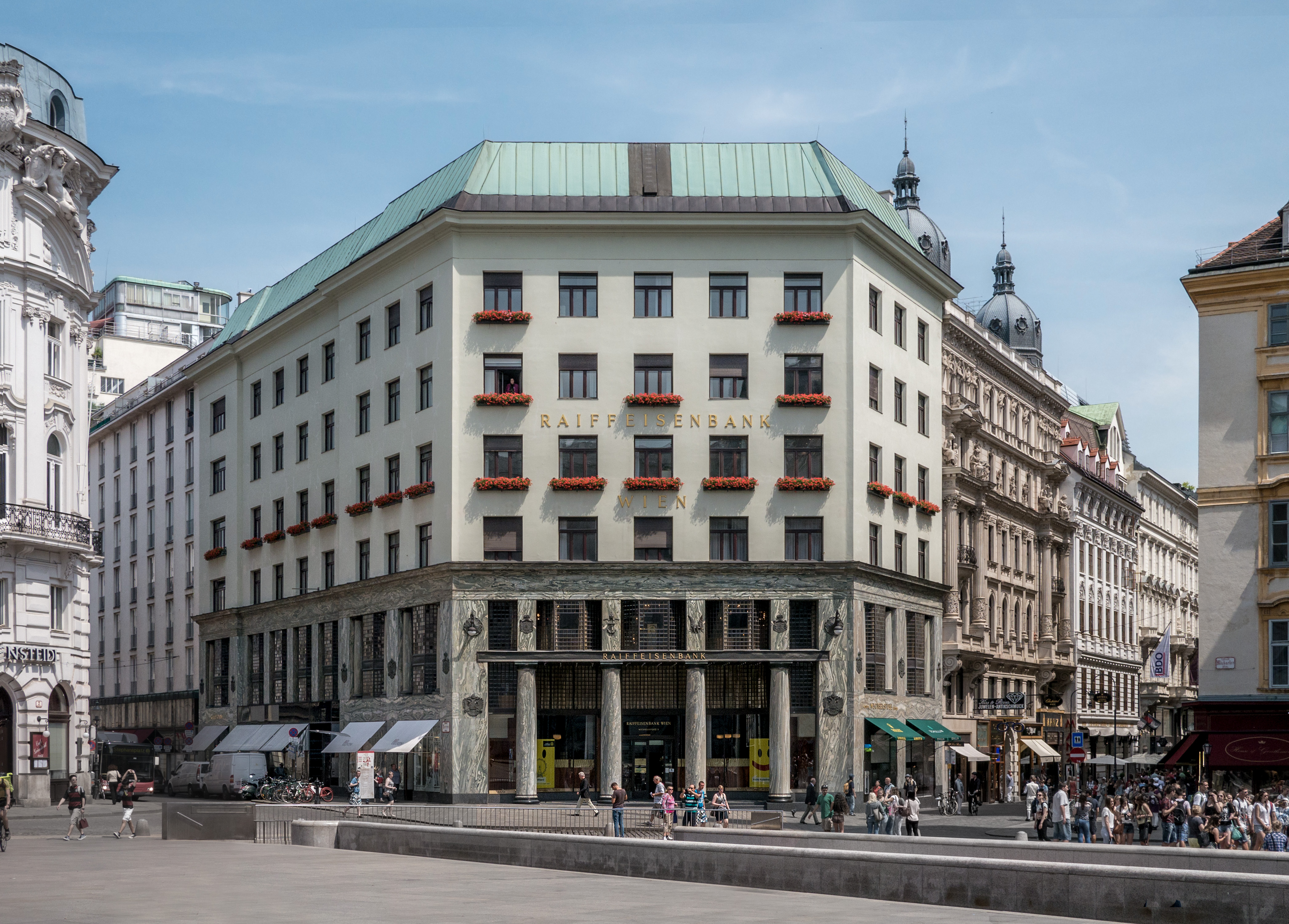
Looshaus in Vienna, constructed by Adolf Loos, 1909

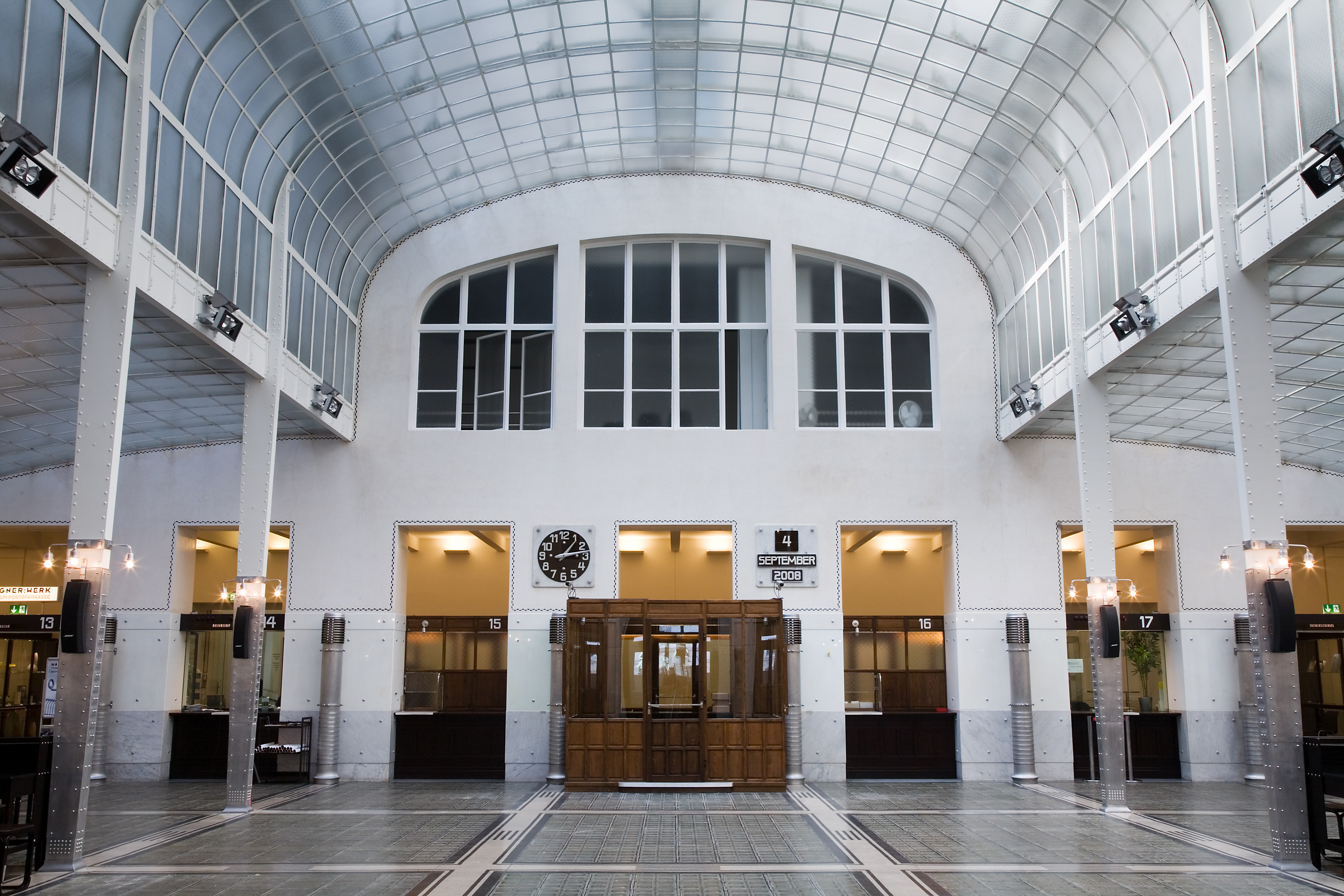
Cashier's Hall of the Postal Savings Bank Postsparkasse in Vienna, designed by Otto Wagner, 1906

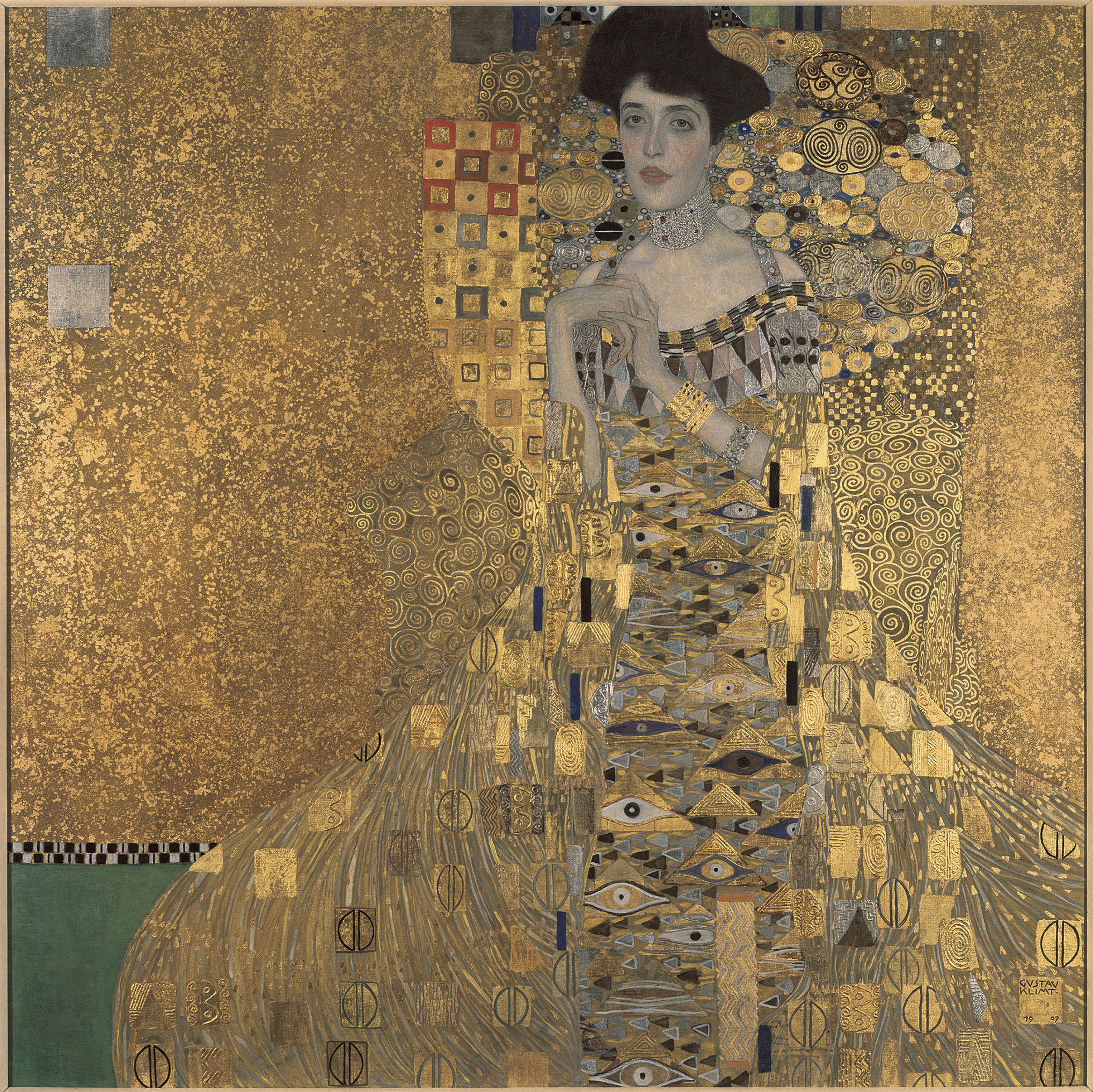
Portrait der Adele Bloch-Bauer by Gustav Klimt, 1907

The Wiener Moderne (Austrian German pronunciation: [ˈviːnɐ mɔˈdɛrnɛ]) or Viennese Modernism is a term describing the culture of Vienna in the period between approximately 1890 and 1910. It refers especially to the development of modernism in the Austrian capital and its effect on the spheres of philosophy, literature, music, art, design and architecture.

== Background ==
Under Emperor Franz Joseph I., the conservative-Catholic Austrian-Hungarian Empire reaches its zenith and enters its final phase. Industrialization remains comparatively sluggish, a large administrative apparatus continues to tighten its empire-wide grip, with nationality conflicts in the multi-ethnic state coming to a head. Against this backdrop, in the empire's urban centers (Vienna, Budapest, Prague, Trieste, Zagreb, etc.) intellectual achievements abound in the development of - often contradictory - principles, opinions, scientific approaches and trends. The capital city of Vienna, which in 1900 has more than 2 million inhabitants, has become a cultural melting pot, because it is here that Central Europe's economic and intellectual elite congregate.

Viennese political life is complex and tense. Social Democracy (Victor Adler), Zionism (Theodor Herzl) and Austromarxism (Otto Bauer) develop. Vienna's Mayor Karl Lueger, to use his own words, instrumentalizes open anti-Semitism as a political strategy. In 1914, nine percent of Viennese citizens are Jews. Jewish writers, composers, actors and scientists, men such as Karl Kraus, Arthur Schnitzler, Gustav Mahler, Arnold Schoenberg and Alfred Polgar, play important roles in science and the arts.

In an atmosphere characterized by conservative pomp on the one hand, and the pursuit of progress on the other, artists turn their attention away from naturalism and begin to focus on the inner world and on the psyche. The concept of ego disintegration gains traction. Ernst Mach describes the ego as "unrettbar", i.e. beyond recovery. The connection between the ego and society, the "Ich" and the world, is no longer primarily based on reason, but rather on the border regions between dream and reality, reason and feeling. A "mood" is seen as often expressing more than could be conveyed by mere words.

Ideas and concepts are imported via direct personal relationships between individuals who embraced avant-garde thinking. Friedrich Nietzsche and Richard Wagner play an important role in public discourse. The literary critic and author Hermann Bahr regularly commutes between Berlin and Vienna, thus subjecting himself to relentless change as a result of being exposed to ever newer ideas. Bahr starts out as a Wagnerian and a follower of Bismarck, then becomes a Marxist, a naturalist, a symbolist, an expressionist and, finally, a conservative Catholic.

For the implementation of the ideas of Viennese Modernism (as opposed to architectural and literary historicism) the year 1897, with the founding of the Vienna Secession, proved decisive. Adolf Loos, the influential architect, was substantially informed by, and throughout his life remained true to, the impressions he gathered during his stay in America from 1893 to 1896, especially in Chicago and New York.

== Significant personalities and works ==
=== Architecture ===
The architect Otto Wagner wrote a book titled "Moderne Architektur von 1895" (en: Modern architecture of 1895), in which he declares the era and predominance of the historic style (especially the buildings on the Ringstraße in the neo-Greek, neo-roman and neo-baroque styles) to be over. He did not know of the term "Moderne" yet, he only spoke of the necessity for architecture to keep up and adapt to new technological developments. Otto Wagner himself would make use of new building materials such as steel and iron and encompass it into his work.

Adolf Loos designed some of the most well known structures of the period. These included the Looshaus, the American Bar, and the Steiner House, among others. The Looshaus in Vienna (also known as the Goldman & Salatsch Building) marks the rejection of historicism, as well as the ornaments used by the Wiener Secession. Adolf Loos received the assignment in 1909, and the building was finished in 1910. Upon opening, its appearance shocked Vienna's citizens, since their overall taste was still very much historically oriented. Because of the lack of ornaments on the façade, people called it the 'house without eyebrows'. The American Bar, also known as the Kärntner Bar, showcases Loos' combination of simple, unadorned forms with opulent materials and fine, simple detailing to give a modern, rich impression. The Steiner house was designed for the painter Lilly Steiner and her husband Hugo. It is located in a Vienna suburb. The Steiner house became a highly influential example of modern architecture; it played a significant role in establishing Loos' reputation as a modern architect to the audience outside of the Viennese community, and became an obligatory reference for architects during the 1920s and 30s. Almost all of the literature of the Modern Movement has reproduced the garden façade as an indisputable example of radical rationalist modern architecture.

=== Art ===
Gustav Klimt is the most notable Viennese artist produced in this period. Characterised by his symbolic use of gold to portray beautifully rendered figures, The Kiss is his most famous piece.

Another significant figure in this movement was Egon Schiele, a pupil of Klimt's. They both pioneered the exploration of sexuality typical of the end of a century.

=== Literature ===
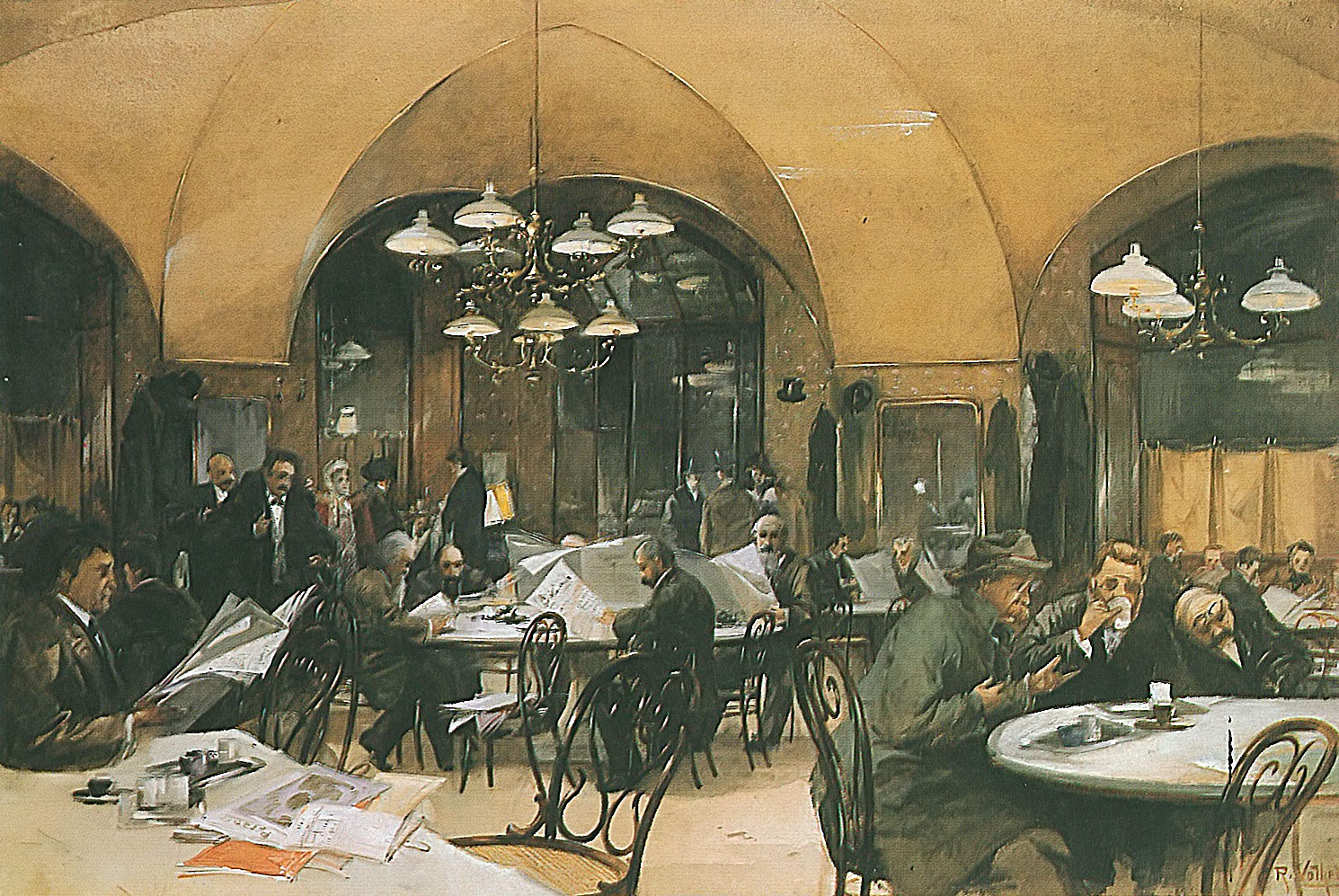
Café Griensteidl, gathering place for members of the Young Vienna circle, in 1896 (Reinhold Völkel)

The most notable literary grouping of this period was the Young Vienna movement, a society of "coffeehouse literati" centred on the writer and critic Hermann Bahr. Bahr's 1890 work Zur Kritik der Moderne (On Criticism of Modernity) established the word modernism as a literary term, whilst Die Überwindung des Naturalismus (The Surpassing of Naturalism) published the following year, declared the then current style of naturalism to be at an end. He was influenced in this by developments in French literature, notably symbolism, which he had encountered while studying in France (1888–1890) where he had come to know the works of avant-garde writers such as Joris-Karl Huysmans, Paul Bourget and Maurice Barrès. Bahr proclaimed a new Romantik der Nerven (romanticism of the nerves), which concentrated on the impressions and sensations of the human soul; in this he referred back to developments in the still new science of psychology and his critical writings were consequently influenced not only by literary writers but also by psychologists, notably Sigmund Freud, and the philosopher of science Ernst Mach. The literary consequence of this Romantik der Nerven was the encouragement of literary forms that foregrounded the perceptions of the individual, among them the unreliable narrator and the interior monologue.

Bahr used his position in Vienna as a theatre critic and feuilletonist to promote other members of the Young Vienna circle, most notably Hugo von Hofmannsthal, who met at the Café Griensteidl and later at the Café Central. Other members of the group included Arthur Schnitzler, Peter Altenberg, Felix Salten, and Stefan Zweig, all of whom, though disparate in styles and interests, demonstrate different facets of the character of the Wiener Moderne in their writing. Schnitzler created one of the earliest examples of modernist stream of consciousness writing in Lieutenant Gustl (1900), and his most famous work, Reigen (La Ronde) (1897), is typical of the fin de siècle interest in sexuality. Hofmannsthal's early poems show the influence of the French symbolists and Stefan George's aestheticism, whilst his work as a librettist for Richard Strauss reflects the interpenetration of the different branches of the arts typical of the epoch. The aphorist Altenberg is notable as much for his archetypically bohemian lifestyle as for his writing. Salten, best known nowadays for his later children's books, is widely regarded as the author of the infamous pornographic novel Josephine Mutzenbacher, a sign arguably of the decadence that was associated with the period. Zweig (also a librettist for Strauss) was, in addition to his own stylistically polished writing, a noted translator of the symbolists, and later a passionate defender of a collective European culture in the face of aggressive nationalism, reflecting the openness of the epoch to foreign cultural influences and indeed the melting pot of different cultures that was part of fin-de-siècle Vienna.

The other dominant voice in Viennese literature during this period was the satirist Karl Kraus. Originally Kraus had been associated with the Young Vienna writers but he broke with them and attacked them in his 1897 essay Die demolierte Literatur (Demolished Literature), which was written after Café Griensteidl burnt down. In his periodical Die Fackel (The Torch), Kraus regularly satirised lazy journalism, which he considered to be exemplified in the feuilleton writing of many of his contemporaries, but his interests ranged over many of the other issues which were prominent in the cultural life of fin-de-siècle Vienna, among them Zionism, psychoanalysis, political corruption and nationalism, all of which he attacked in the pages of Die Fackel. The antagonism between Kraus and other leading Viennese cultural figures, which in the extreme case of his criticism of Felix Salten's feuilletons led to Salten assaulting him in the street, but also encompassed spats with Freud, Theodor Herzl and Hugo von Hofmannsthal among others, might be seen as a sign of the vigorous debate characteristic of the period.

=== Music ===
Wholly characteristic of the Wiener Moderne is the conflict between Gustav Mahler and the Vienna Philharmonic, whose conservative tradition did not align with the modern compositions of Mahler. The fundamental goal of Modernism was to break from the past, but Mahler's attempt to upset tradition was poorly received. Other Modernist musicians in Vienna included Schoenberg, Anton Webern, and Alban Berg, whose compositions were central to the Second Viennese School. Modernist music in Vienna was criticized as nagging, demoralizing, and damagingly hostile, yet the Modernists viewed this as a progressive necessity.
