= Church of Saint Michael, Vienna =

Church in Vienna, Austria

Saint Michael's Church
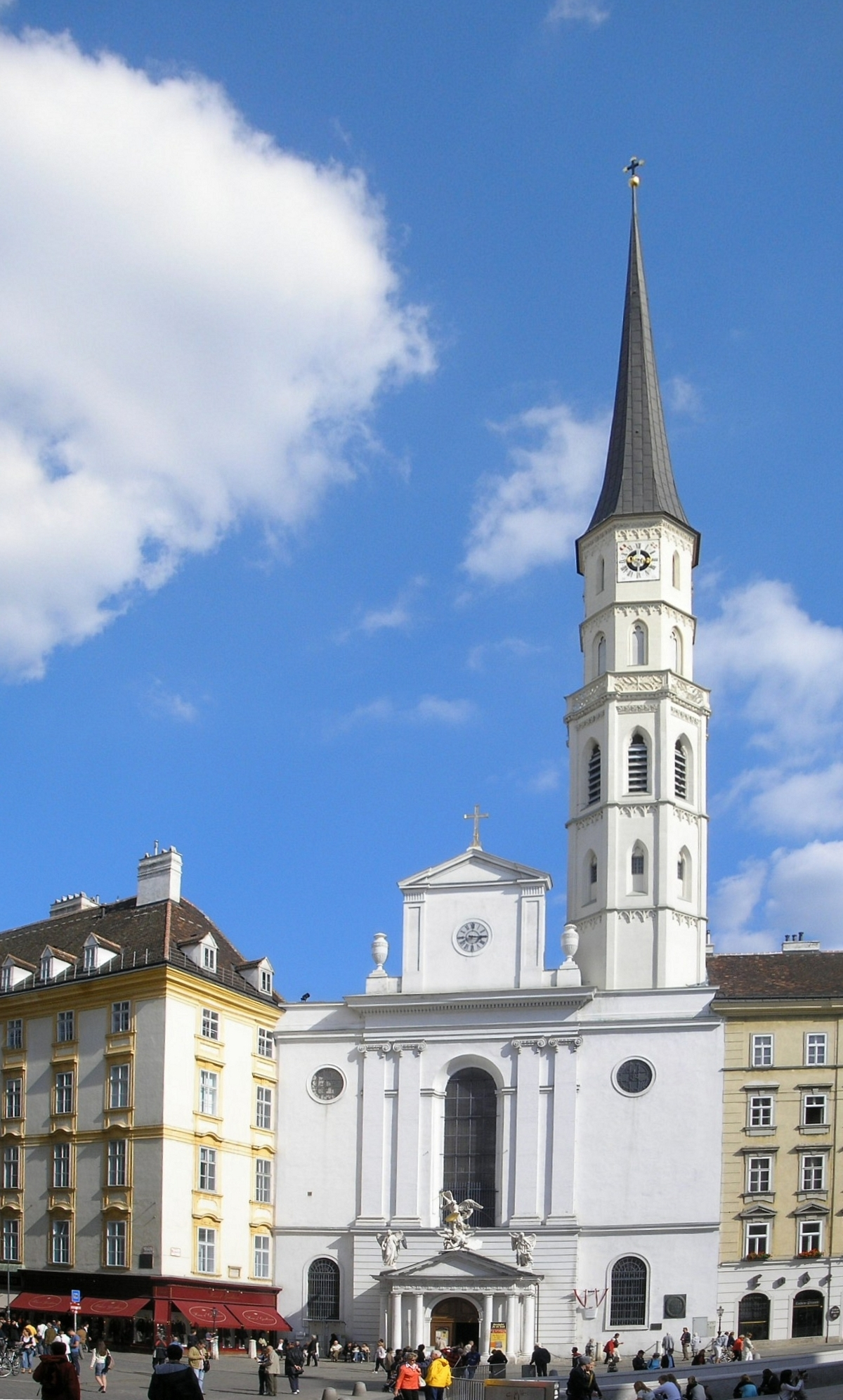

- Location within Vienna Location within Austria

Religion
- Affiliation: Catholic Church
- Ecclesiastical or organisational status: Active
- Leadership: P. Peter van Meijl, SDS
- Year consecrated: 1217

Location
- Location: Vienna, Austria
- State: Vienna
- Coordinates: 48.208056°N 16.366944°E

Architecture
- Type: Church
- Style: Romanesque, Gothic, Baroque
- Completed: 1792

Specifications
- Direction of façade: WNW
- Length: 65 m (213 ft)
- Width: 35 m (115 ft)
- Width (nave): 15 m (49.2 ft)

Website
- www.michaelerkirche.at

Saint Michael's Church (German: Michaelerkirche) is one of the oldest churches in Vienna, Austria, and also one of its few remaining Romanesque buildings. Dedicated to the Archangel Michael, St. Michael's Church is located at Michaelerplatz across from St. Michael's Gate at the Hofburg Palace. St. Michael's used to be the parish church of the Imperial Court, when it was called Zum heiligen Michael.

Over its long history, spanning more than eight centuries, the church has incorporated a medley of architectonic styles. The church is a late Romanesque, early Gothic building dating from about 1220–1240. There is a document giving 1221 as the foundation date of the church, but this is most probably a 14th-century forgery. Over time, there have been many alterations, resulting in its present-day aspect, unchanged since 1792.

== Interior ==
The interior of the church consists of a nave and two aisles that have conserved the ancient Gothic structure. The side chapels were added later on.

It gives the impression of a robust three-dimensional building, despite the church's low height. The polygonal apse was replaced in the 14th century (1327–1340) by an early Gothic choir with three bays. The central and the northern choir chapels were refitted in Baroque style.

The high altar was designed in 1782 by Jean-Baptiste d’Avrange. It is decorated with the monumental stucco alabaster Rococo sculpture Fall of the Angels (1782) by sculptor Karl Georg Merville. It represents a cloudburst of angels and cherubs, falling from the ceiling towards the ground. It was the last major Baroque work completed in Vienna. The centerpiece of the high altar is Maria Candia, a Byzantine icon of the Virgin Mary, belonging to the Cretan School of hagiography and named after the former capital (now Heraklion), displayed as being carried by two archangels.

In the northern chapel, the altarpiece Adoration of the Child is by Franz Anton Maulbertsch (1754–1755).

The southern chapel, the Nikolauskapelle, has remained unchanged and retains its medieval aspect. Its traceried windows date from the 13th century. It displays Gothic stone sculptures under a baldachin (St. Catherine and St. Nicolaus) (1350) and a wooden crucifix by Hans Schlais (1510–1520). This chapel was founded by a cook of the duke at about 1350, giving thanks to the Lord for being acquitted of a poisoning case. The triumphal arch between the transept and the choir dates from the 14th century. Its spandrel is decorated with The Last Judgment.

The recently rediscovered frescoes from the early 15th century attest to the high quality of the art of painting in Vienna in those times. The Baptistery shows us in a niche the wooden statue Man of Sorrows (1430).

The gilded pipe organ (1714) by Johann David Sieber is the largest Baroque organ in Vienna. It was once played by the 17-year-old Joseph Haydn in 1749. Mozart's Requiem was performed for the first time in this church at a memorial service for the composer on 10 December 1791. As Mozart hadn't finished this work at the time of his death, only the existing part was performed. One of those who attended the "festive funerary honors" was theater director Emanuel Schikaneder whose libretto was used by Mozart for The Magic Flute.

== Exterior ==
The present façade was built in 1792 in a Neoclassical style by Ernest Koch, a typical style for the reign of emperor Joseph II. Above the entrance, on top of the pediment, resting on Doric columns by Antonio Beduzzi, stands a group with winged angels and St. Michael slaying Lucifer (1725). These sculptural figures were executed by the Italian sculptor Lorenzo Mattielli, who also sculpted the Hercules figures at the Hofburg entrance, just opposite the church. The high polygonal Gothic bell tower from the 16th century has become one of the symbols of the Inner City.

== Crypt ==
St. Michael's is famous for its Michaelergruft, a large crypt located underneath the church. Aristocrats were able to access their family crypts through marble slabs marked with their coats of arms in the church floor. The coffin of a deceased member of the family could then be lowered directly into the crypt via these marble slabs.

Due to the special climatic conditions and constant temperature in the crypt, more than 4000 corpses were kept well preserved. Hundreds of mummified corpses, some still in burial finery or with a wig, are on display, some in open coffins, adorned with flowers or skulls, others decorated with Baroque paintings or with vanitas symbols. The most famous among them is Pietro Metastasio (1698–1782), the most famous writer of opera librettos of the baroque era.

== Excavations ==
Archaeological excavations in the Michaelerplatz between 1989 and 1991 uncovered among other things the settlement of Canabæ associated with the Roman camp at Vindobona. This will have consisted primarily of the residences of soldiers' wives and children. The excavation site was made permanently accessible to the public in 1991; the design of the presentation is by architect Hans Hollein.

== Gallery ==
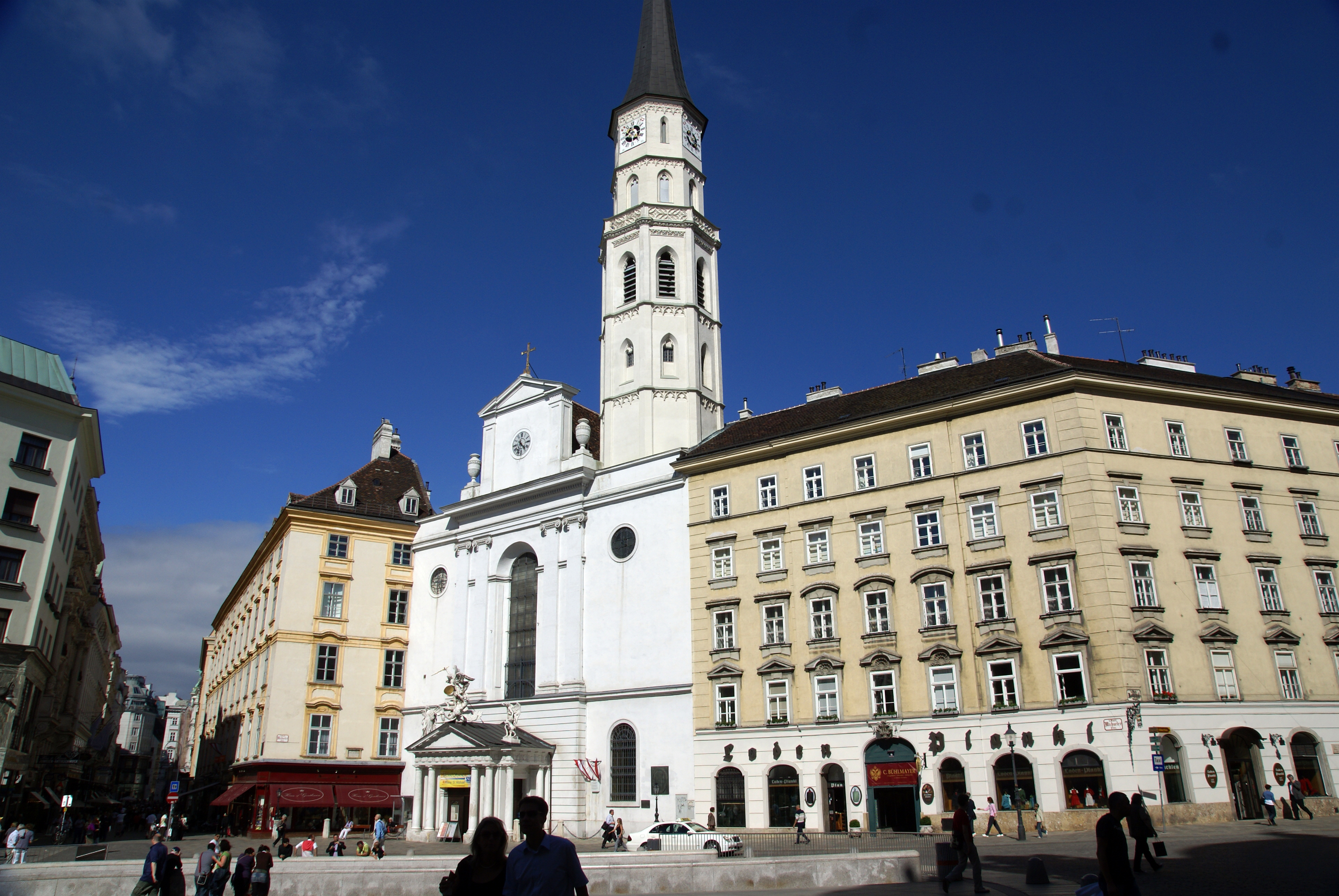
Michaelerplatz

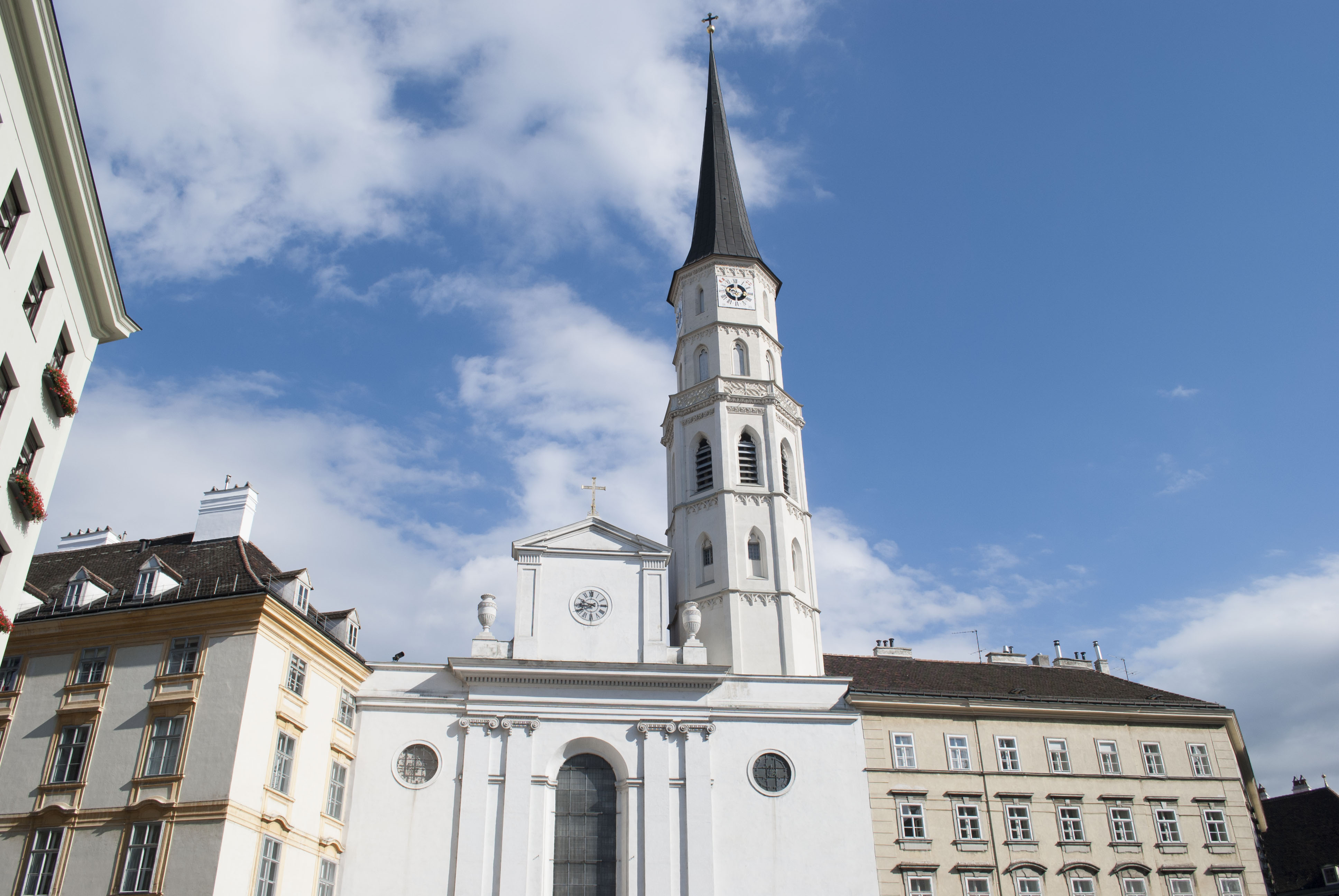
St. Michael's Church

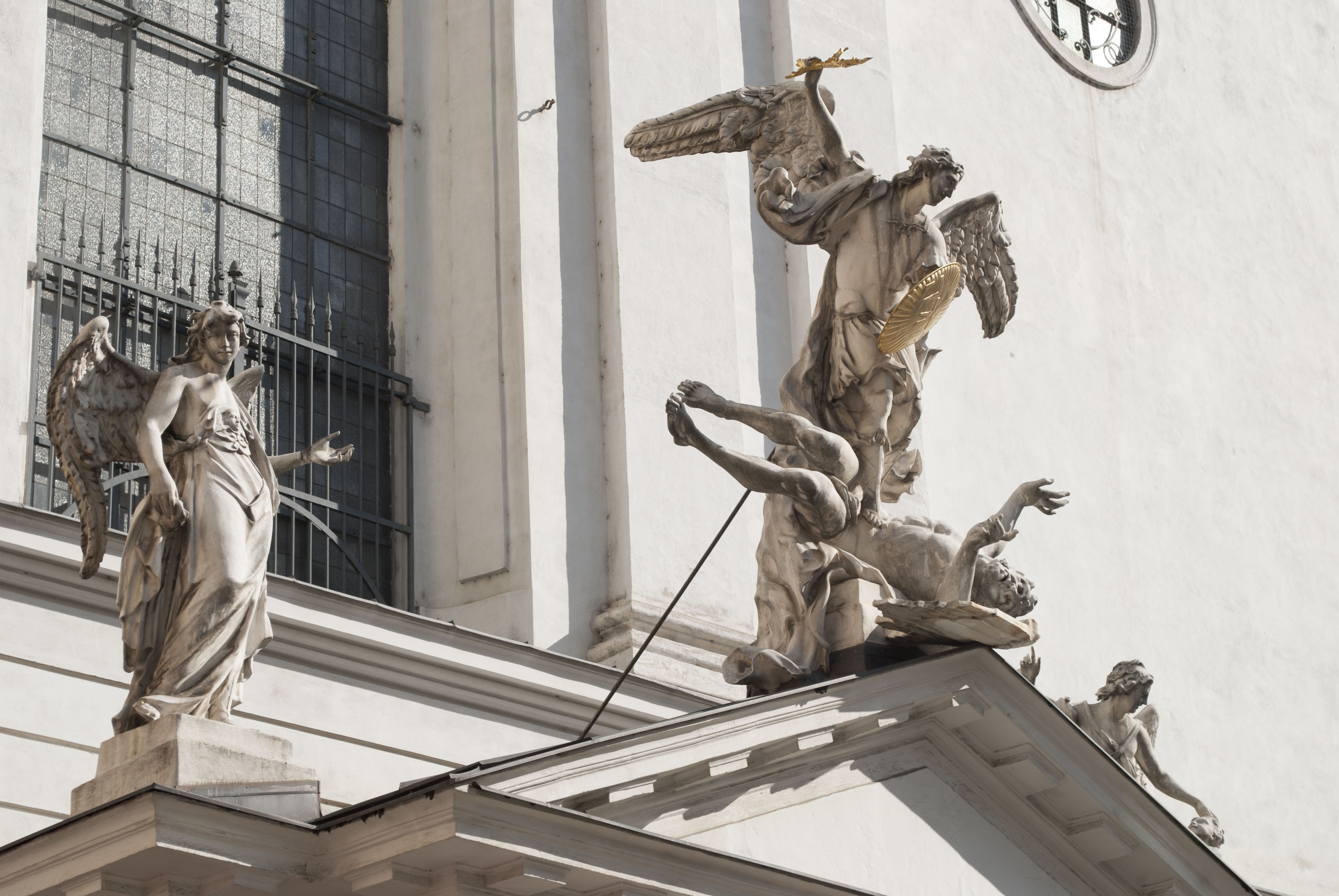
St. Michael

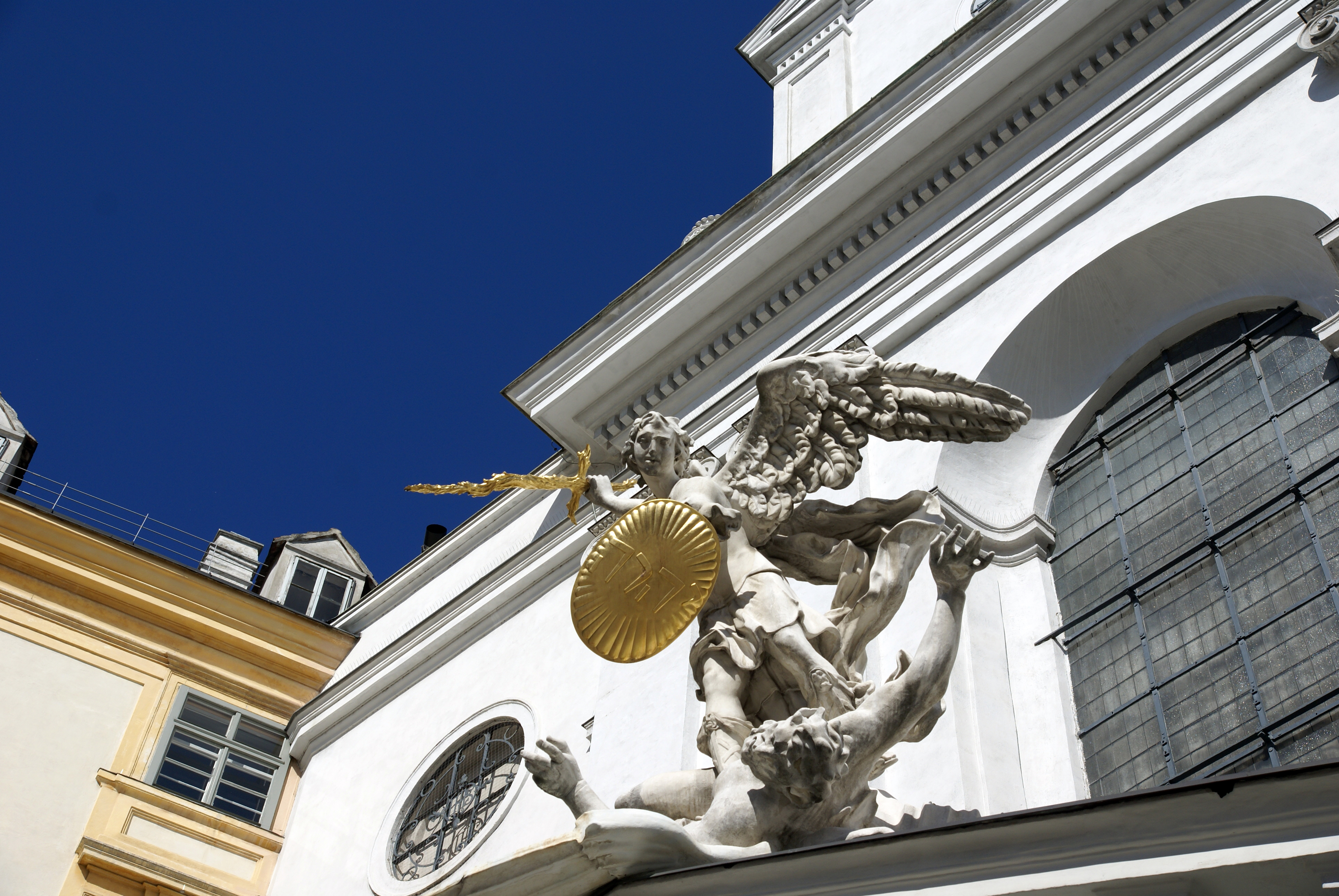
St. Michael

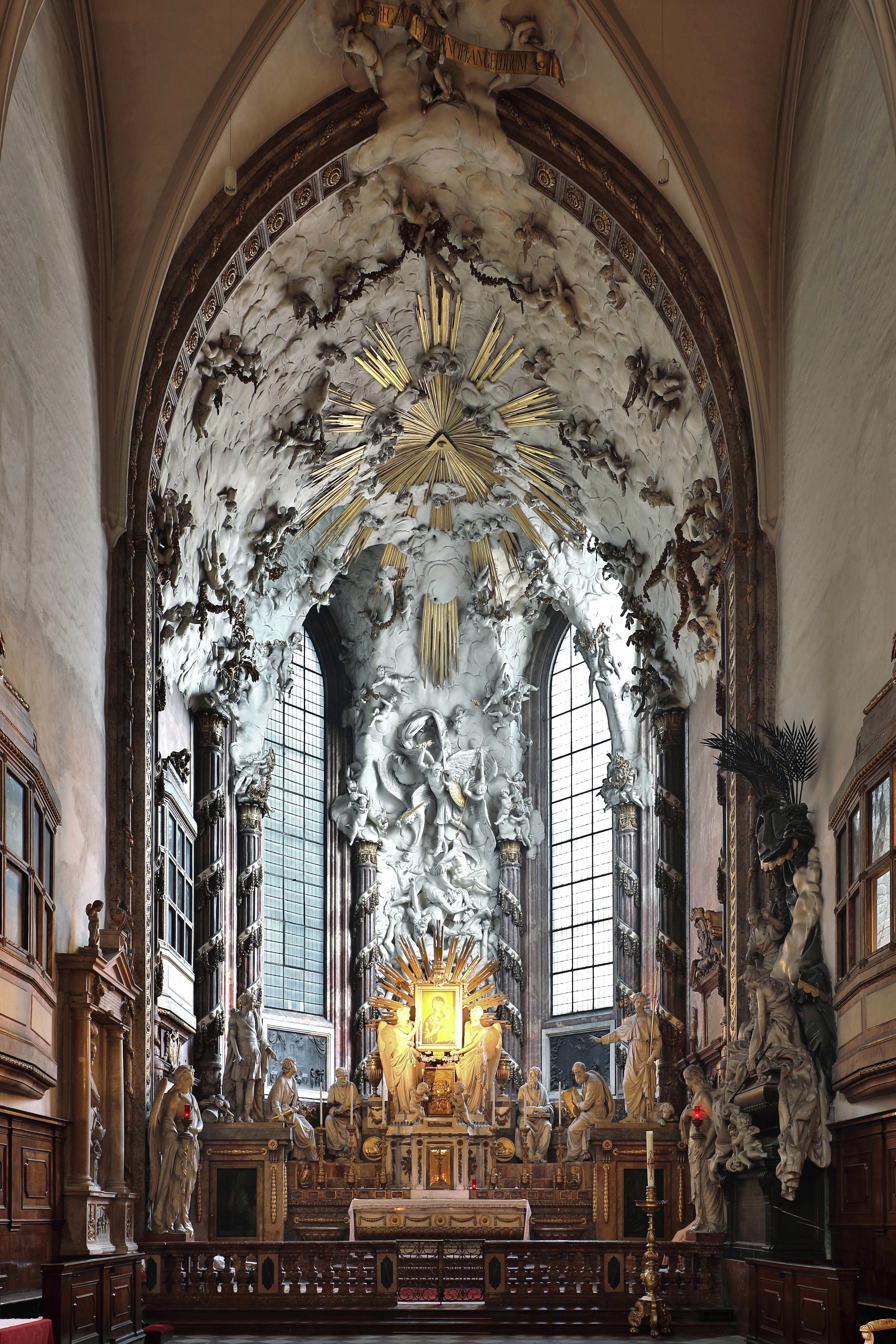
High altar with Fall of the Angels and the Maria Candia icon

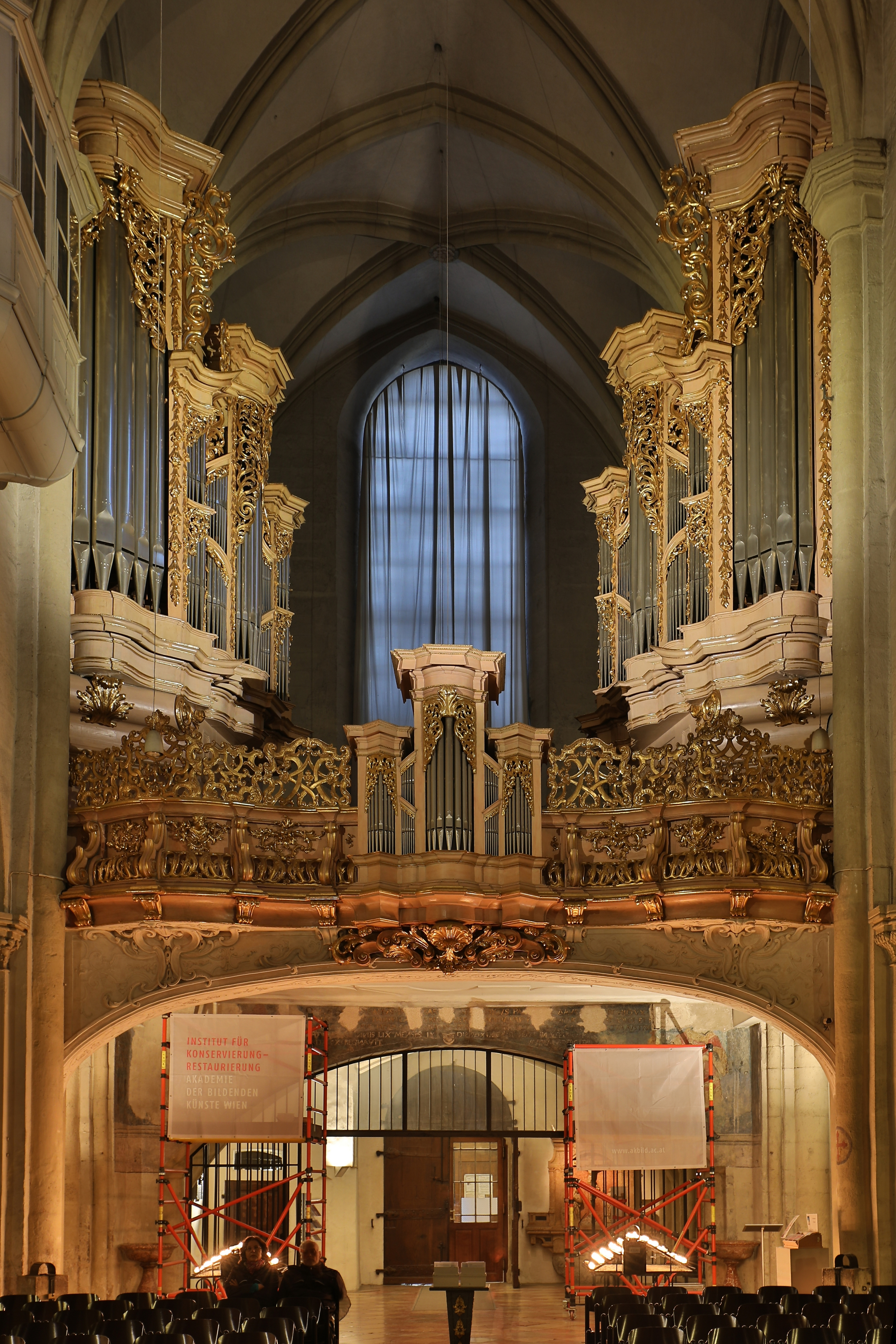
Organ

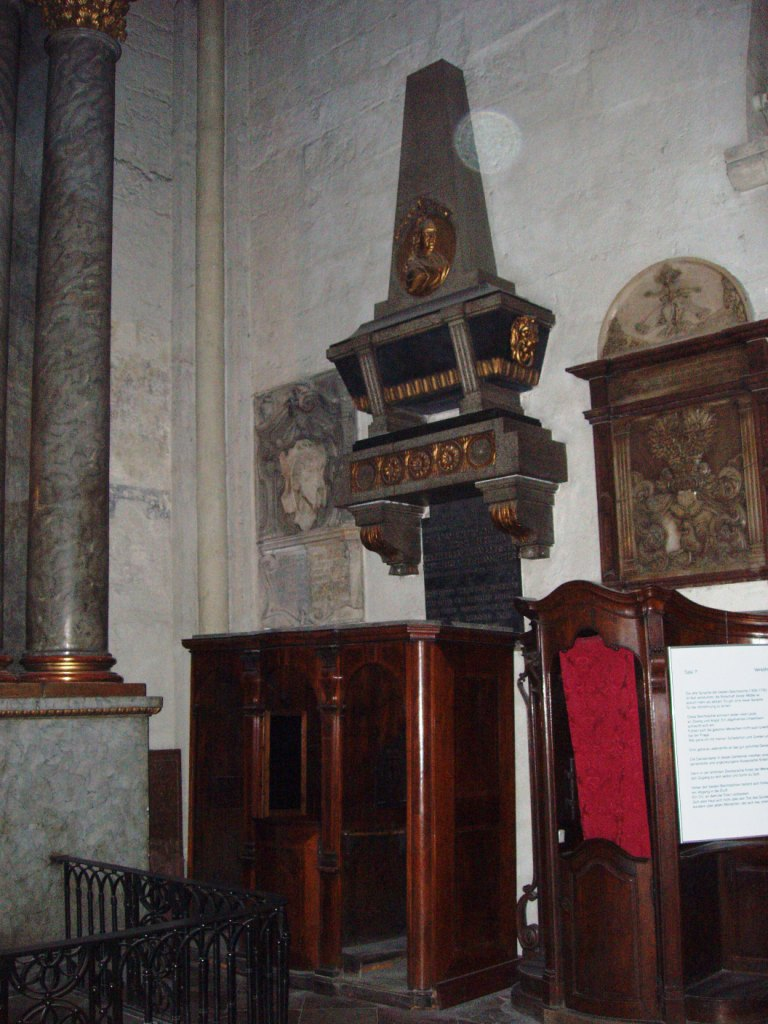
Old entrance to the crypt

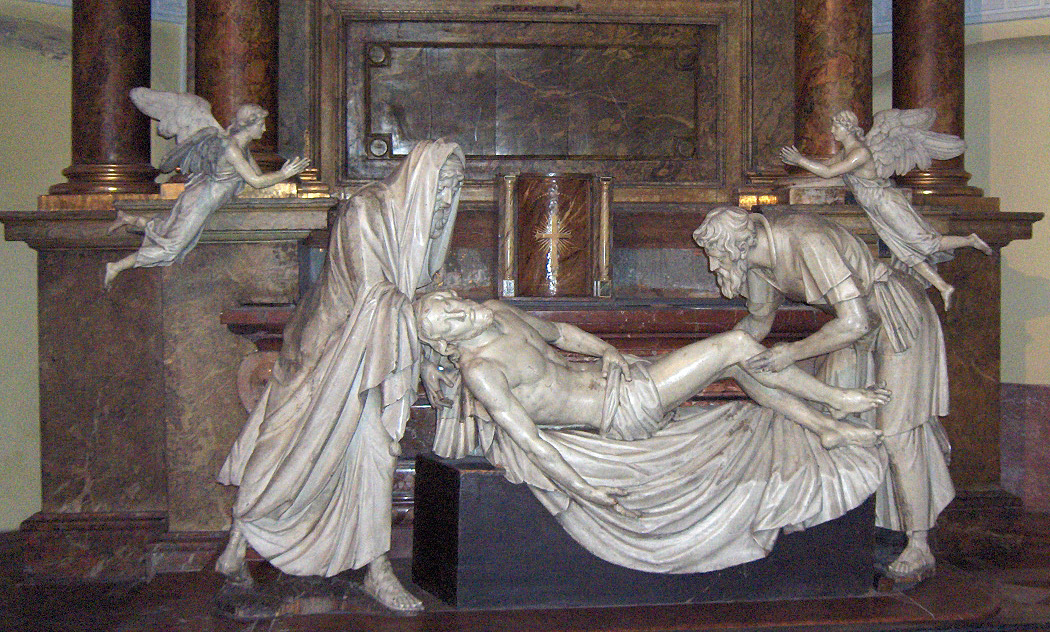
Marble statue of the Deposition of Christ

Werdenberg Chapel

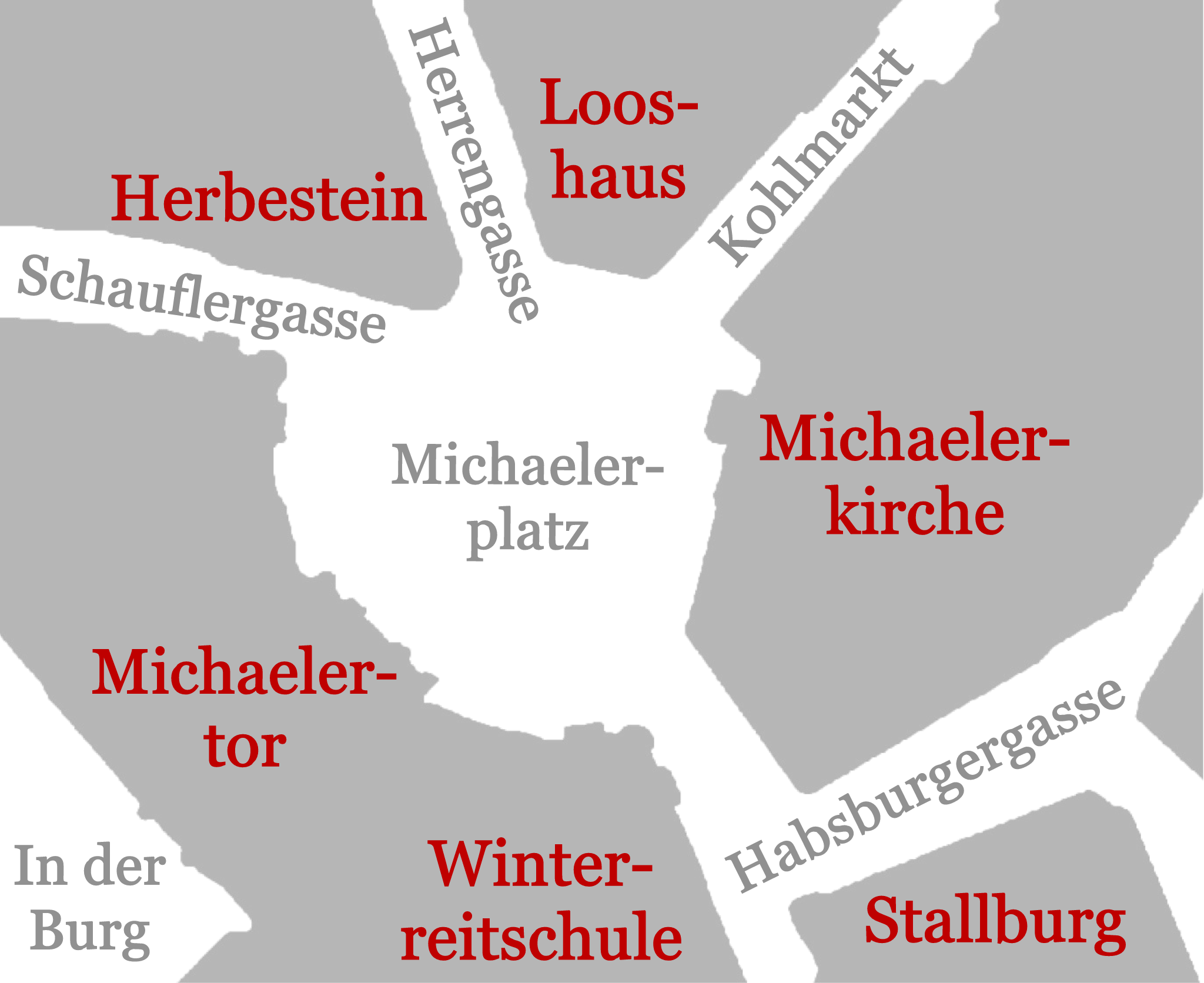
Plan of Michaelerplatz

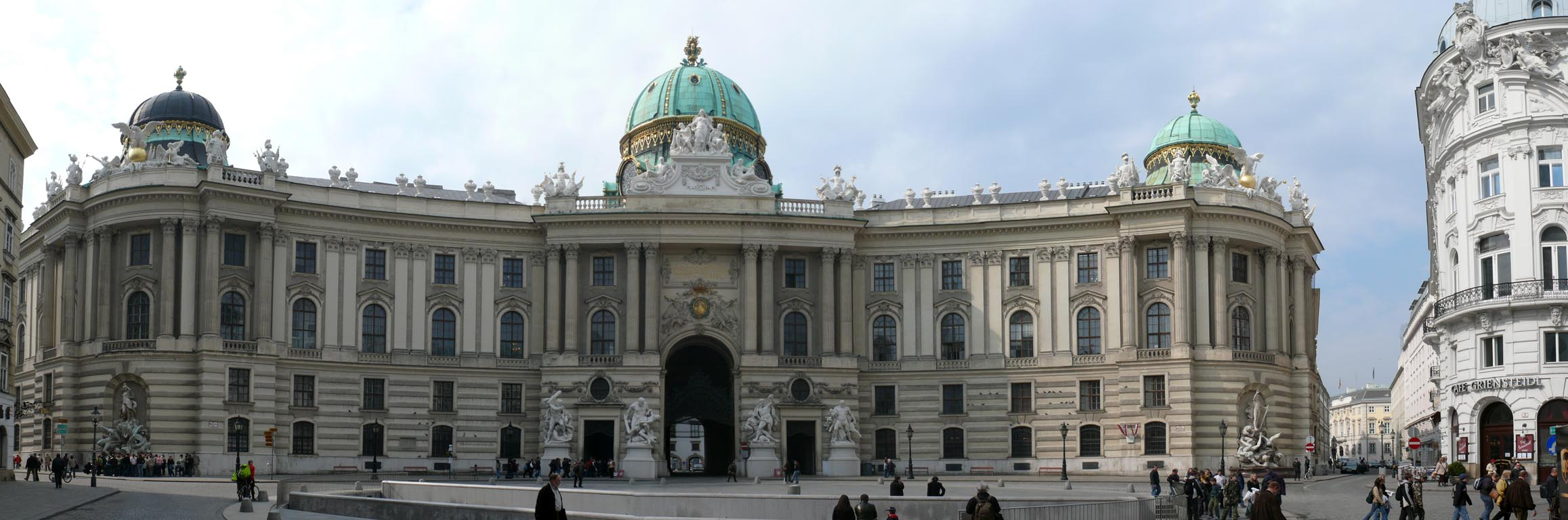
Hofburg, Michaelerplatz, 2007
