= Bösendorfer (disambiguation) =

Bösendorfer may refer to:

- Bösendorfer, a piano manufacturing company
- Bösendorfer-Saal, a former concert hall in Vienna
- Ignaz Bösendorfer (1796–1859), founder of the piano manufacturing company
- Imperial Bösendorfer (piano)
