= 2012 in public domain =

When a work's copyright expires, it enters the public domain. The following is a list of works that entered the public domain in 2012. Since laws vary globally, the copyright status of some works are not uniform. Not all works in the public domain have been expired, some works are deliberately donated into the collection for the public good by their owners.

== Entering the public domain in Europe ==
In most European nations with the exception of Belarus, copyright law extends for the life of the author or artist, plus 70 years.

=== Authors ===
- Sherwood Anderson
- Gabriel Alomar i Villalonga
- Elizabeth von Arnim
- Raffaello Bertieri
- Simon Dubnow
- Adriano Tilgher
- Marina Ivanovna Tsvetaeva
- Hugh Walpole
- Virginia Woolf
- James Joyce
- Tariro Musindo

=== Film ===
- Walter Ruttmann

=== Music ===
- Frank Bridge
- Arkady Gaidar
- Amalia Guglielminetti
- Alter Kacyzne
- Gustav Gerson Kahn
- Adolf Koczirz
- Jelly Roll Morton

=== Other notable figures ===
- Edward Bausch
- Henri Bergson
- Frederick Banting
- Robert Baden-Powell
- John Gutzon de la Mothe Borglum
- Louis Brandeis
- August Cesarec
- Louis-Joseph Chevrolet
- Robert Delaunay
- James Frazer
- Tullio Levi-Civita
- Lazar Markovich Lissitzky
- George Minne
- Gaetano Mosca
- Ignacy Jan Paderewski
- Kole Nedelkovski
- Wilhelm II
- Petar Poparsov
- Giuseppe Rensi
- Rabindranath Tagore
- Santiago Rusiñol

== Brazil ==
- António Cabreira

== Entering the public domain in the United States ==
In the United States, the copyright status of works extends for the life of the author or artists, plus 70 years. If the work is owned by a corporation, then the copyright extends 95 years.

Due to the passing of the Copyright Term Extension Act (Sonny Bono Copyright Term Extension Act) in 1998, works never registered or published before January 1, 1978, and whose authors died before 1942 entered the public domain in this jurisdiction on January 1, 2012. Other works would not enter the public domain here until 2019.

In January 2012, the Supreme Court in a 6-2 decision stated that works in the public domain can have their copyright status renewed.

== Worldwide ==
As part of the Open Goldberg Variations, released a recording of Johan Sebastian Bach's Goldberg Variations performed by pianist Kimiko Douglass-Ishizaka into the public domain through a CC0-licence.

In August 2012, Jason Rohrer announced that all of the videogame Diamond Trust of London will enter the public domain.

British musician Dan Bull releases the public domain-song Sharing is Caring, which becomes nr 9 on the UK Independent Singles Chart.

On April 5th 2012, Nature Publishing Group released publication data for more than 450,000 articles into the public domain.

On September 12th 2012, Europeana released 20 million records into the public domain.

== See also ==
- List of countries' copyright lengths
- Public Domain Day
- Creative Commons
- Public Domain
- 1961 in literature for death writers
- Over 300 public domain authors available in Wikisource (any language), with descriptions from Wikidata
