= Carl Hutterstrasser =

Austrian businessman and musician

Carl Hutterstrasser (11 June 1863 – 29 March 1942) was an Austrian piano manufacturer, owner of the company Bösendorfer. He was also a musician and sportsman.

== Life ==
Hutterstrasser was educated at the Akademisches Gymnasium in Vienna, and from 1882 worked in his father's bank, J. H. Stametz & Co, running it with his father until its merger in 1908 with Unionbank.

He took over in 1909 the piano manufacturer Bösendorfer, from Ludwig Bösendorfer, who had no heirs. After the demolition in 1913 of Palais Liechtenstein, Herrengasse where the company's sales room and the associated concert venue Bösendorfer-Saal were situated, a new sales room, the Bösendorfer Stadtsalon, was opened at the Musikverein in Vienna.

After the First World War, the company expanded its export business. In 1931 his two sons Alexander and Wolfgang became partners in the business, and they took over on their father's death in 1942.

From 1910 he was a director of Gesellschaft der Musikfreunde in Vienna, and until 1938 was its financial adviser.

=== Musician and sportsman ===
Hutterstrasser studied composition with Eduard Kremser, and was regarded as a brilliant pianist and cellist. Using the pseudonym Charles Vernay, he appeared as an accompanist at song recitals. He composed vocal works, mainly for men's choir and vocal quartets.

In sport he was an enthusiastic cyclist and skier.
