= Bösendorfer =

Austrian piano manufacturer

L. Bösendorfer Klavierfabrik GmbH

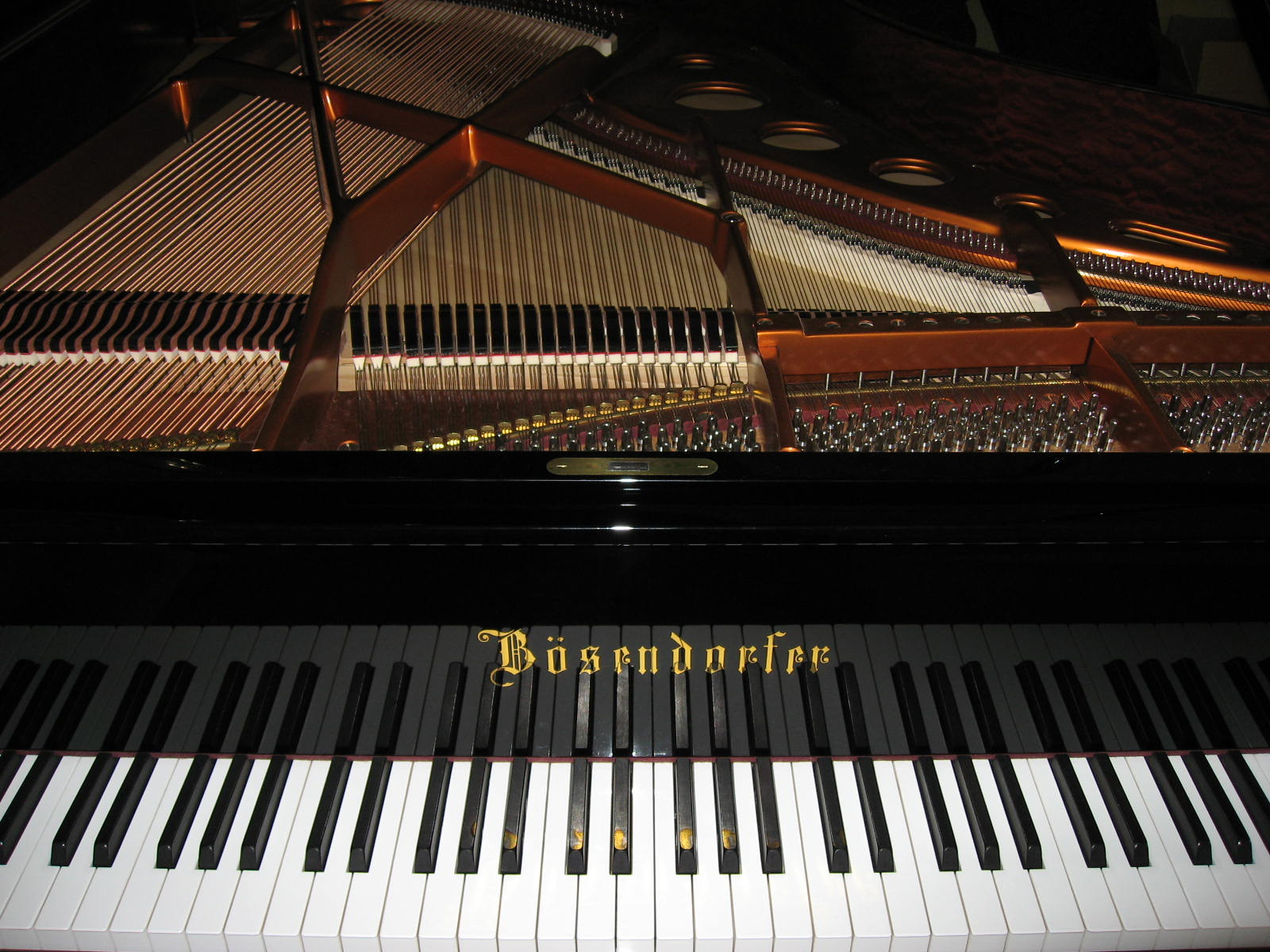
- Bösendorfer 185 piano built in 2006
- Type: Subsidiary
- Industry: Musical instruments
- Founded: 1828; 198 years ago
- Founder: Ignaz Bösendorfer
- Headquarters: Vienna, Austria
- Products: Pianos
- Parent: Yamaha Corporation
- Website: www.boesendorfer.com

Bösendorfer (L. Bösendorfer Klavierfabrik GmbH) is an Austrian piano manufacturer founded in 1828 and wholly owned subsidiary of Yamaha Corporation since 2008. Bösendorfer is unusual in that it produces pianos with 97- and 92-key models in addition to instruments with standard 88-keys.

== History ==
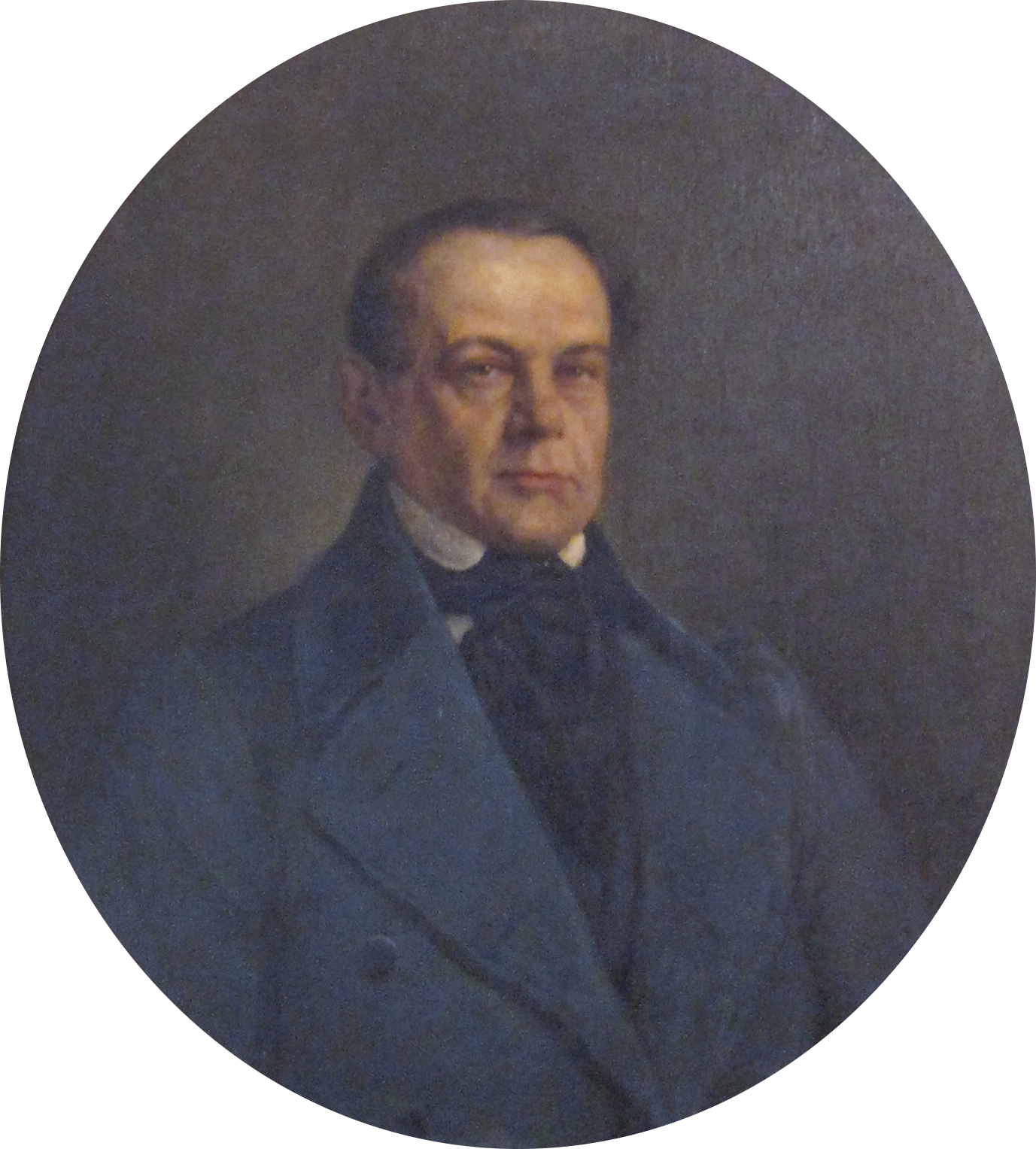
Ignaz Bösendorfer, founder

Bösendorfer, one of the oldest piano manufacturers, was established in 1828 by Ignaz Bösendorfer. It has a history of producing highly respected instruments.

In 1830, it was granted the status of official piano maker by the Emperor of Austria.

Ignaz's son Ludwig Bösendorfer (1835–1919) assumed control in 1859, operating from new premises from 1860.

Between 1872 and its closure in 1913, the associated Bösendorfer-Saal was one of the premier concert halls of Vienna.

In 1909, Carl Hutterstrasser purchased the company and was succeeded by his sons Alexander and Wolfgang in 1931.

In 1966, the Jasper Corporation (later renamed Kimball International), parent company of Kimball Pianos, assumed control of Bösendorfer.

In 2001, Bösendorfer returned to Austrian hands, when the BAWAG PSK Gruppe purchased it.

On 21 December 2007, BAWAG signed an agreement to sell 100% of Bösendorfer to Yamaha Corporation.

Bösendorfer continues to make handcrafted pianos in the same Vienna factory. Almost 300 of these premium pianos are made each year.

== Characteristics ==
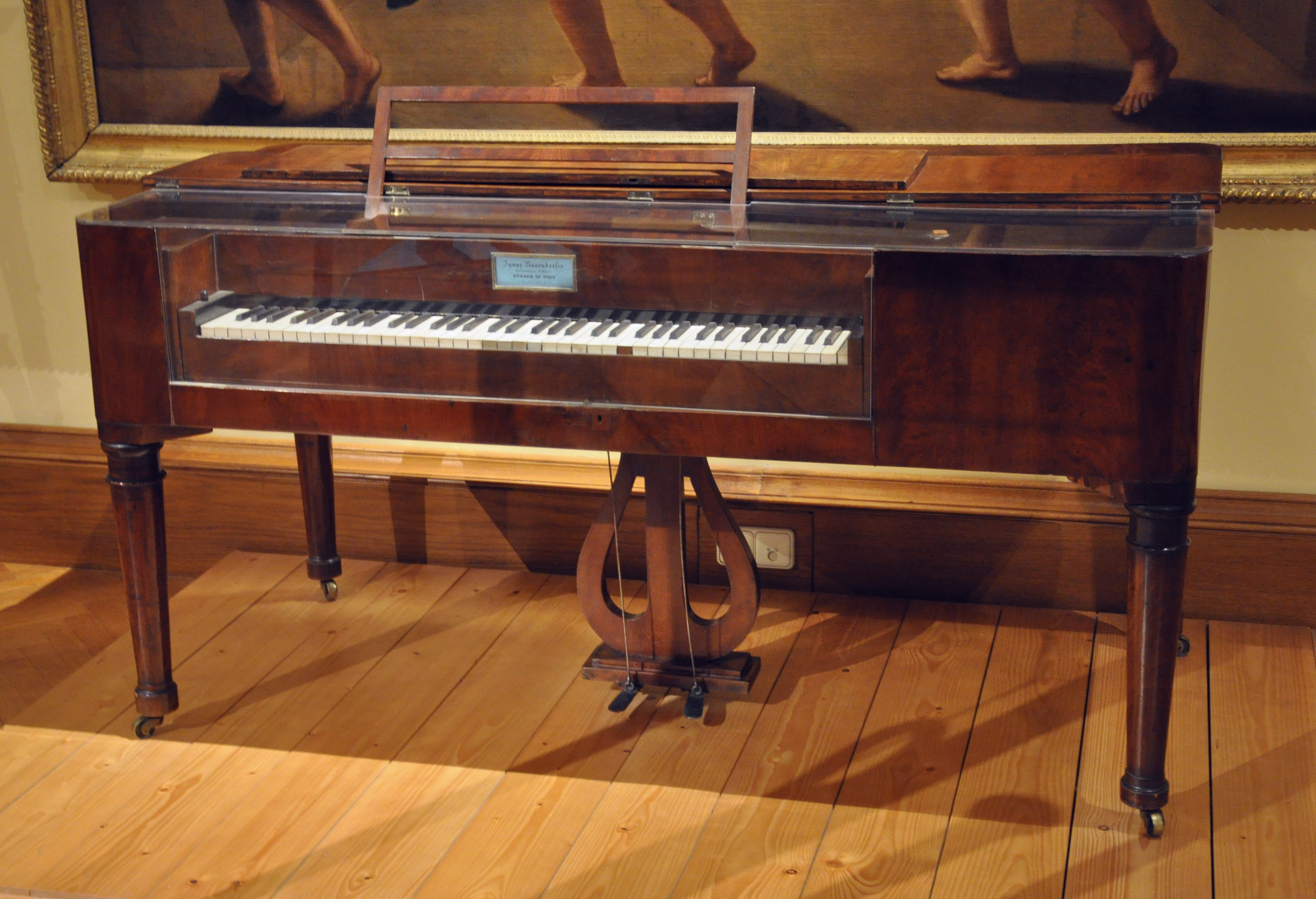
The oldest preserved square piano by Bösendorfer, dating to 1828

Bösendorfer pioneered the extension of the typical 88-key keyboard, creating the Imperial Grand (Model 290), which has 97 keys (eight octaves). Ferruccio Busoni commissioned this innovation in 1909 as part of a custom piano, as he wanted to transcribe an organ piece that extended to the C below the standard keyboard. This innovation worked so well that this piano was added to regular product offerings and quickly became one of the world's most sought-after concert grands. Because of the 290's success, the extra strings were added to Bösendorfer's other line of instruments such as the 225 model, which has 92 keys. The extra keys, at the bass end of the keyboard, were originally hidden beneath a hinged panel mounted between the piano's conventional low A and the left-hand end-cheek to prevent their being struck accidentally during normal play; more recent models have omitted this device and simply have the upper surface of the extra natural keys finished in matte black instead of white to differentiate them from the standard 88.

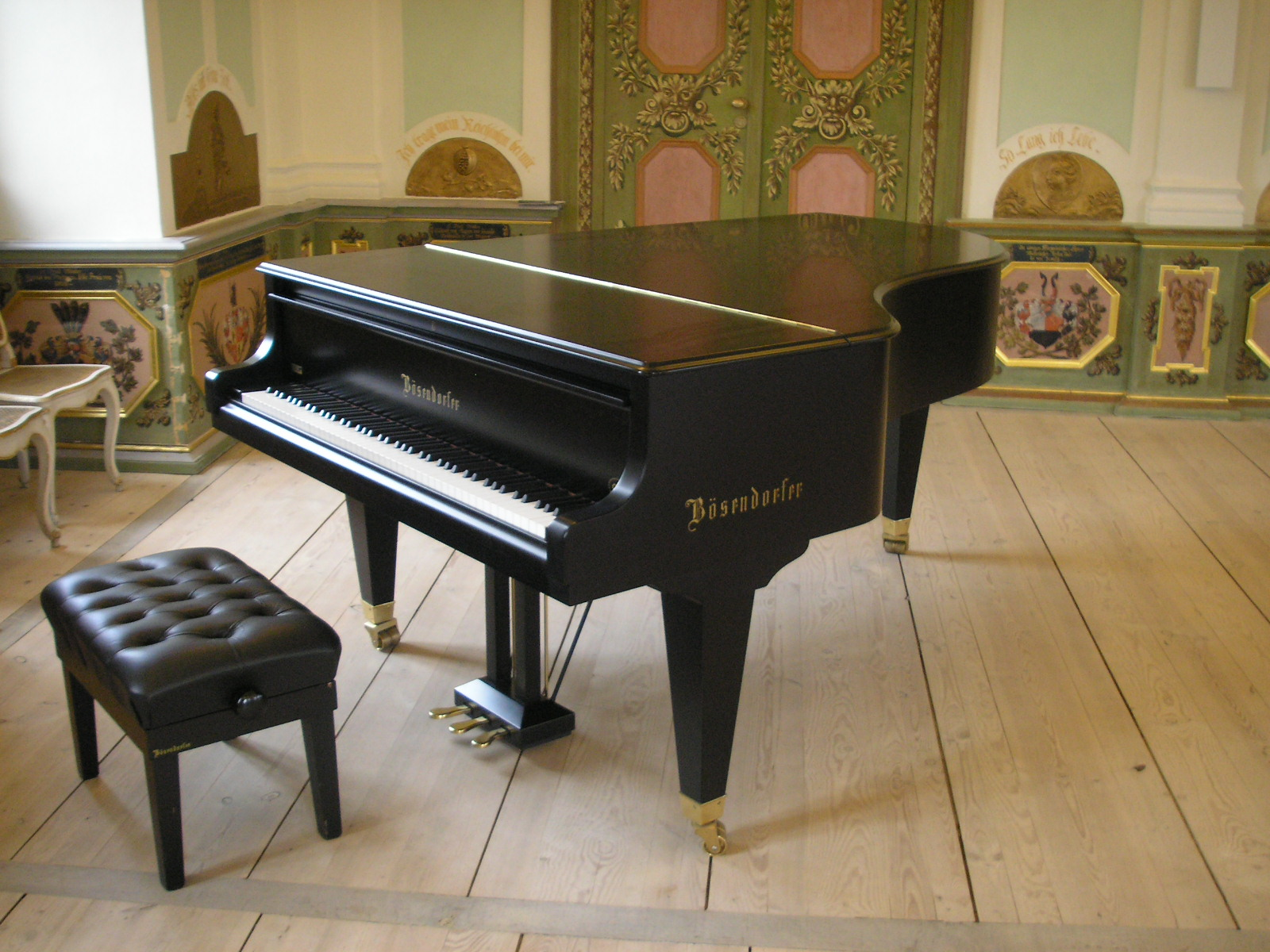
A Bösendorfer piano, model 214CS

The rim of a Bösendorfer grand piano is built quite differently from that of all other grands. Instead of veneers bent around a form, the rim is made in solid sections of spruce and jointed together. Spruce is better at transmitting sound than reflecting it. This is perhaps why Bösendorfers tend to have a more delicate treble and a bass that features the fundamental tone more than the higher harmonics. There are also two other features of Bösendorfers that are shared with only a few other piano brands: one is a removable capo d'astro bar in the treble, which facilitates rebuilding of the instrument and, Bösendorfer says, provides greater acoustic separation from the plate, decreasing tonal absorption; the other is single-stringing, providing each string its own individual hitch pin on the plate instead of connecting it to a neighbouring string. This design may slightly improve tuning stability and is an advantage in case of string breakage.

The latest development in the Bösendorfer range is the CEUS digital grand piano reproducing system, which incorporates a computer-controlled mechanism that records a performance on a digital storage medium (magnetic disk or memory chips) and reproduces it. The requisite equipment can be fitted to most Bösendorfer pianos to allow the direct recording of pieces while capturing all the keyboard velocity data as a .boe file. Bösendorfer uses a proprietary format to record key and pedal movements as a digital file.

== Models ==
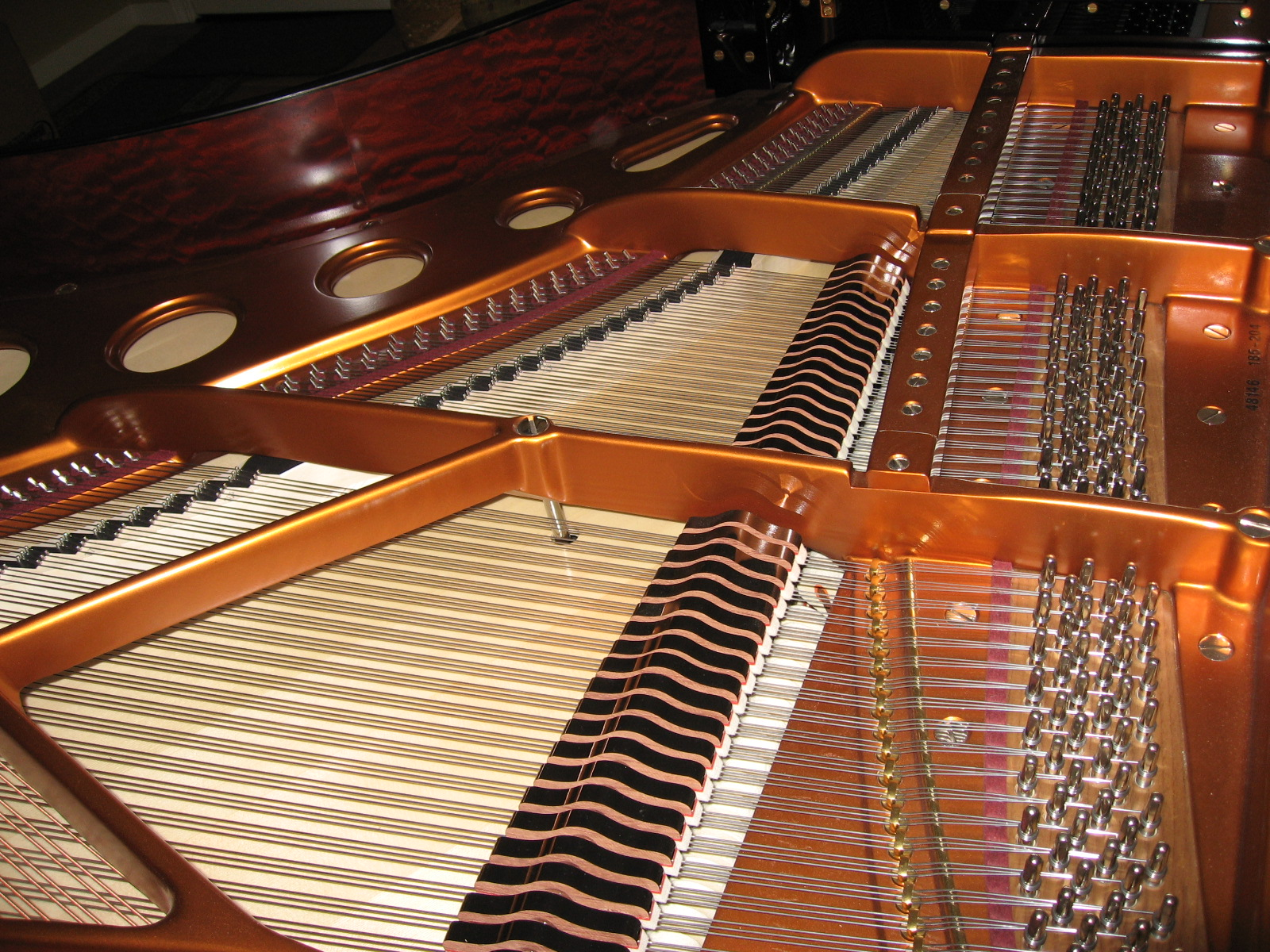
The removable capo d'astro bar is located across the upper two (treble) sections of the cast-iron plate

Bösendorfer makes eight models of grand piano from 155 to 290 cm (5 ft 1 in – 9 ft 6 in) and two vertical pianos, 120 and 130 cm (3 ft 11 in and 4 ft 3 in). The Imperial Grand is one of the world's largest pianos. Each numerical Bösendorfer model directly corresponds to its length in centimeters. For example, a Model 170 is 170 cm (5 ft 7 in) long. These tables describe the Bösendorfer models:

=== Grand pianos ===
Models:

Model	Length	Keys
155	155 cm (5 ft 1 in)	88
170 VC	170 cm (5 ft 7 in)	88
185 VC	185 cm (6 ft 1 in)	88
200	200 cm (6 ft 7 in)	88
214 VC	214 cm (7 ft 0 in)	88
225	225 cm (7 ft 5 in)	92
230 VC	230 cm (7 ft 7 in)	88
280 VC	280 cm (9 ft 2 in)	88
290 Imperial	290 cm (9 ft 6 in)	97

=== Upright pianos ===
Models:

Model	Height	Keys
120	120 cm (47 in)	88
130	130 cm (51 in)	88

=== Conservatory Series ===
To appeal to a wider market, Bösendorfer designed the Conservatory Series for colleges and universities that could not afford Bösendorfer's standard black-model pianos. The production of the two CS Series pianos spends less time in "non-critical areas", cutting down costs of production and purchase, making them more affordable than standard models. The cases and frames are of satin finish, rather than polished and, initially, the pianos were loop-strung rather than single-strung, but those practices have since been abandoned.

=== Special and Limited editions ===
Bösendorfer has produced a number of specially designed pianos named after famous composers such as Franz Schubert, Frédéric Chopin and Franz Liszt, as well as pianos designed for special occasions, such as Bösendorfer's 170th and 175th anniversaries.

==== SE reproducing piano ====
Under the ownership of Kimball, Bösendorfer built and sold a small number of Stahnke Edition automatic reproducing pianos based on 3 of the 'Imperial Line' models 225, 275 and 290. The 'SE' designation was for Stahnke Engineering, whose founder, Wayne Stahnke, invented the mechanism. These instruments were fitted with sensors, electronics and mechanical systems to record and play back piano performances extremely accurately through electro-mechanical actuation of the piano keys and pedals. These instruments were designed to work with either performances stored on cassette tapes as digital data, or with an attached MS-DOS IBM PC computer. Using the computer, the SE instruments could be used for recording, editing and playback. The SE system instruments were the first commercially available computer-controlled "player piano" capable of accurately reproducing both the notes and intensity of a performer's playing. This system was not further developed or patented due to its high cost. Competitors soon introduced patented reproducing piano technologies such as the Yamaha Disklavier in 1982.

The Bösendorfer SE instruments were used in a number of well-regarded commercially available audio recordings published on CD, where the performance was recorded on the SE system, but the piano was recorded playing back the performance later in a studio or hall, sometimes on a different instrument. Other audio recordings were produced using converted piano roll recordings from the early 20th century, including a two-disc series entitled 'A Window in Time' featuring performances by Rachmaninoff and produced by Wayne Stahnke.

Thirty-two SE pianos were produced by Bösendorfer between 1984 and 1987, including the 225SE, the 275SE, and the 290SE Imperial model pianos. In the 290 range, this included some 290 to 290SE conversions. One third of the production were 290SE models. Most of these instruments are still in use as of 2024.

The research that went into the SE reproducing system later laid the foundation for the CEUS computerized reproducing piano system, though much of the resulting design was completely different.

=== Designer models ===
Bösendorfer produces a limited number of Artisan Models annually, each available for order only during the calendar year in which it was developed. An example of a designer model is the Bösendorfer Swarovski Crystal Grand piano. Three of these special pianos were produced in 2003 in honour of Bösendorfer's 175th anniversary. Each piano's case is encrusted with 8000 crystals and layers of gold.

Three notable architects who have designed Bösendorfer piano models are Theophil Freiherr von Hansen (1866), Josef Hoffmann (1909) and Hans Hollein (1990). There were only two Hans Hollein 225 models produced in 1990; one can be found in the lounge of the Grand Bohemian Hotel in Orlando, Florida.

== Bösendorfer artists ==
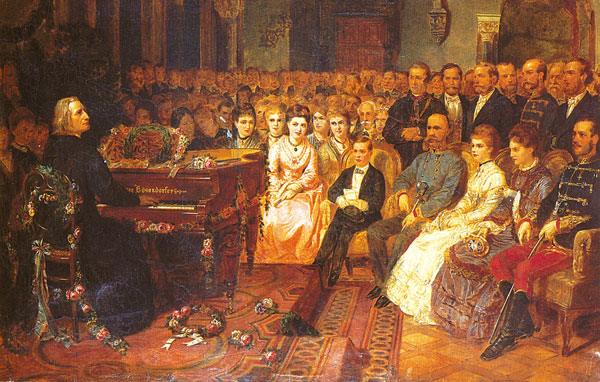
Franz Liszt giving a concert for Emperor Franz Joseph I on a Bösendorfer piano

Among the earliest artists to be associated with Bösendorfer was Franz Liszt, who claimed that Bösendorfer and Bechstein pianos were the only instruments capable of withstanding his powerful playing. The twentieth-century American composer–conductor Leonard Bernstein has also performed on a Bösendorfer. Another pianist who championed Bösendorfer pianos was Wilhelm Backhaus.

In his memoirs, Arthur Rubinstein claims to have insisted on a Bechstein instead of the hall's Bösendorfer before a recital in Austria. After the performance, the then-head of the Bösendorfer company came backstage to meet this young artist who refused to play a piano highly cherished by his Russian namesake, Anton Rubinstein; Rubinstein claims he thereafter always sought out Bösendorfers when in Austria.

In the late 1970s, following a concert performed in Vienna, jazz pianist Oscar Peterson turned to his impresario, Norman Granz, with the words "Dammit, Norman, where does this box go? I also gotta have such a thing!", in reference to a Bösendorfer 290. Musician/comedian Victor Borge also played Bösendorfer pianos.

More recent examples of notable artists who have played the Bösendorfer include Russian pianist Sviatoslav Richter; Hungarian pianist András Schiff; Austrian pianist Alfred Brendel; Italian pianist Arturo Benedetti Michelangeli; American free jazz pianist Cecil Taylor and American singer-songwriter Tori Amos; German pianist Wolfgang Rübsam; Austrian pianists Friedrich Gulda, Walter Klien and Paul Badura-Skoda; and British pianists Leon McCawley and Mark Gasser.

Minimalist composer Charlemagne Palestine chose a nine-foot Bösendorfer as the vehicle on which to perform his 1974 composition Strumming Music. Released as his first compact disc in 1991, it features in excess of 45 minutes of Palestine forcefully playing two notes in rapid alternation, slowly expanding into clusters, with the sustain pedal depressed throughout.

Jazz pianist Keith Jarrett performed the solo improvisations (his Köln Concert) at the Cologne Opera in Cologne, Germany, on 24 January 1975 on a Bösendorfer and became a Steinway & Sons artist in 1981.

=== Recordings ===
Bösendorfer pianos have appeared on numerous records. Some examples are:

==== Classical (recordings made with historical Bösendorfer pianos) ====
- Wolfgang Brunner, Michael Schopper. Anton Bruckner. Piano Works. Label: CPO. Played on a Bösendorfer piano (before 1835).
- Christoph Eggner. Anton Bruckner. Piano Pieces from the Kitzler-Studienbuch. Label: Gramola.
- Christian Lambour. Schubert, Ries, Hummel, Kuhlau, Reinecke, Czerny. Almost Mozart: Fantasies after Mozart. Label: Koch Schwann. Played on pianos by Bösendorfer (1846) and Broadwood (1812).
- Hardy Rittner, Teunis van der Zwart. Johannes Brahms. Early Piano Works Vol. 2. Label: Dabringhaus und Grimm (MDG). Played on an Ignaz Bösendorfer piano (1849–1850).
- Yves Saelens, Jan Vermeulen. Robert Franz. Lieder. Label: Etcetera Records. Played on a Bösendorfer piano (1851).
- Isabelle Faust, Alexander Melnikov, Teunis van der Zwart. Johannes Brahms. Horn Trio Op. 40, Violin Sonata Op. 78, Fantasies Op. 116. Label: Harmonia Mundi. Played on a Bösendorfer piano (1875).
- Isabelle Faust, Alexander Melnikov. Albert Dietrich, Robert Schumann, Johannes Brahms. Violin Sonatas Op. 100 & 108. Label: Harmonia Mundi. Played on a Bösendorfer piano (1875).
- Alexander Melnikov. Franz Schubert, Frédéric Chopin, Franz Liszt, Igor Stravinsky. Four Pianos, Four Pieces. Label: Harmonia Mundi. Played on pianos by Alois Graff (c. 1828–1835), Érard (1837), Bösendorfer (c. 1875) and Steinway (2014).
- Italian Piano Quartet. Johannes Brahms. Piano Quartets Op. 25, 26 & 60. Label: Symphonia. Played on a Bösendorfer piano (1880).
- Maria Milstein, Jozef De Beenhouwer. Johannes Brahms. Hauskonzert bei Brahms - Mürzzuschlag, 23. August 1885. Label: Brahms Museum Mürzzuschlag. Played on a Ludwig Bösendorfer piano (1882).
- Sirkka-Liisa Kaakinen, Tuija Hakkila. Brahms. Sonatas for Violin and Piano. Label: Ondine. Played on pianos by Bösendorfer (1892) and J. B. Streicher (1864).
- Simona Eisinger, Zuzana Ferjenčíková. Sergei Rachmaninoff, Robert Schumann, Johannes Brahms, Richard Strauss. Seelenverwandt. Label: Schwechtenstein-Records. Played on pianos by J. B. Streicher (1847), Friedrich Ehrbar (1878) and Ludwig Bösendorfer (1893).
- Simona Saturova, Markéta Cukrová, Vojtěch Spurný. Antonín Dvořák. Moravian Duets. Label: Supraphon. Played on a Bösendorfer piano (1879).
- Radoslav Kvapil. Antonín Dvořák. Dvořák Piano Works. Label: Alto. Played on the composer's own Bösendorfer piano (1879).
- Radoslav Kvapil. Antonín Dvořák. Dvořák Piano Works II. Label: Alto. Played on the composer's own Bösendorfer piano (1879).
- Jan Michiels. Antonín Dvořák. Suite Op. 98, Poetische Stimmungsbilder Op. 85, Humoresken Op. 101. Label: Eufoda. Played on a Bösendorfer piano (1884).
- Jan Michiels. Johannes Brahms. Klavierstucke & Intermezzi Opus 116-119. Label: Eufoda. Played on a Bösendorfer piano (1884).
- Sofja Gülbadamova. Ernst von Dohnányi. Suite in the olden style, Pastorale, Variations on a Hungarian folk song. Label: Capriccio. Played on the composer's own Bösendorfer piano (1910).

==== Classical (recordings made with modern Bösendorfer pianos) ====
- Malcolm Frager recorded ten compositions by Frédéric Chopin on a Bösendorfer Imperial 290 piano for the TELARC label on 3 and 4 August 1978. This is one of the earlier, high-quality digital recordings of the Imperial. Sampling frequency conversion of Telarc's Soundstream digital master to the Compact Disc format was accomplished with the Studer SFC-16 sampling frequency converter. The digital data was not subject to any analog processing, thus preserving the integrity of the original digital master. Originally released as "Malcolm Frager Plays Chopin", Telarc DG-10040 in 1979. Re-released with "Sonata, Op. 58" added in 1991 on Telarc CD-80280.
- Aldo Ciccolini recorded his second traversal of the piano music of Erik Satie on a Bösendorfer; his first traversal was on a Steinway. Both are included in French EMI set 50999685824 2 5, offering record listeners an unusual opportunity for direct comparison of the two instruments.
- Peter Hill recorded Havergal Brian's complete piano music on a Bösendorfer Imperial at the Northern College of Music for Cameo Classics. John Ogdon highly praised the recordings in his review for Tempo.
- Gerhard Oppitz in 1989 recorded a complete traversal of the solo piano music of Johannes Brahms on an Imperial Grand.
- Awadagin Pratt more recently recorded Mussorgsky's Pictures at an Exhibition, his own transcription of Bach's Passacaglia and Fugue in C minor, BWV 582, and Brahms's Variations and Fugue on a Theme by Handel on an Imperial Grand.
- Sviatoslav Richter recorded Bach's Well-Tempered Clavier on a Bösendorfer at Salzburg in two settings of 1972 and 1973.
- Maria Tipo played Mozart's Piano Concerto No. 21 in C major K 467 on a Bösendorfer with Mozarteum Orchestra Salzburg in 1989.
- Carol Rosenberger recorded music of Liszt, Griffes, Ravel, and Debussy and Beethoven's Appassionata and op. 111 sonatas on an Imperial Concert Grand.
- Moritz Rosenthal played a Bösendorfer for his celebrated series of recordings for His Master's Voice.
- Terry Riley's 1986 minimalist piano piece written in Just intonation, The Harp of New Albion, was recorded on a Bösendorfer Imperial grand piano, specially tuned for Riley himself.
- Robert Silverman committed a complete Beethoven sonata cycle to computer hard drive on a Bösendorfer 290SE reproducing piano. John Atkinson of Stereophile magazine then recorded a similar piano at the Maestro Foundation recital hall in Santa Monica, California replaying the files; the resulting CDs were issued as a 10-disc set.
- Robert Ekelund – Two albums of piano pieces performed by economist and pianist Robert Ekelund, performed on the Murray N. and JoAnn B. Rothbard Bösendorfer Imperial Concert Grand Piano in the Mises Institute's Conservatory. Ekelund also performed Brahms Rhapsody Op. 79, No. 2; J.S. Bach, Gigue, French Suite No. 5 (G-major).
- Valentina Lisitsa Chopin's 24 Études D.V.D. track. Op. 10 and Op. 25 Études.
- Igor Stravinsky's Le Sacre du Printemps, The Firebird and Petrushka played by Dag Achatz and Roland Pöntinen on BIS Records was played on a Bosendorfer Model 275
- Kimiko Douglass-Ishizaka has recorded J. S. Bach's Goldberg Variations for public domain release on the Internet by the Open Goldberg Variations project, an initiative sponsored in part by Bösendorfer. She played a C290 Imperial fitted with the CEUS system. Accompanying the recording—offered in MP3, FLAC, and 24-bit 44 K WAV formats—is a freshly made copy of the full score. Ishizaka also recorded Bach's The Well-Tempered Clavier on a Bösendorfer 280.

J.S. Bach, Prelude No. 8 in E-flat minor, BWV 853
Performed by Kimiko Douglass-Ishizaka on a Bösendorfer 280.

- Costantino Catena has recorded on new Bösendorfer VC280 the CD "Dedications—Schumann-Liszt / Costantino Catena plays the new Bösendorfer 280VC" for Camerata Tokyo
- Zoltán Kocsis recorded on Bösendorfer, together with conductor Ivan Fischer and the Budapest Festival Orchestra, the complete work for piano and orchestra by Bela Bartok for Philips.
- Huang Tiange recorded on his Bösendorfer 225 Carl Czerny Op. 599 Complete in 2019.
- Stéphane Ginsburgh recorded two works (quartet for piano; for four) of composer David Toub on his Bösendorfer 225 for the 2016 album Ataraxia.

==== Popular ====
- Bradley Joseph in his album Rapture.
- Steely Dan on the 1975 album Katy Lied.
- According to composer Jim Steinman, Roy Bittan played a Bösendorfer on the Meat Loaf album Bat Out of Hell in 1977, which was a deviation from Steinman's preference for Yamaha pianos.
- Singer/songwriter Tori Amos has recorded and toured exclusively with Bösendorfers since 1993. She has been endorsing Bösendorfer since 1994.
- Keith Jarrett in The Köln Concert.
- Matt Bellamy of the rock band Muse has used a Bösendorfer.

== In popular culture ==
- A Bösendorfer, with artwork by Japanese artist Takashi Murakami, is seen in the video for Drake's 2020 song "Toosie Slide".
- Dr. Evil plays a Bösendorfer Imperial piano in the Austin Powers movies ('böse' means evil in German). While Mini-Me plays a "mini Bösendorfer Imperial" piano

== General bibliography ==
- Fine, Larry (2007). 2007–2008 Annual Supplement to The Piano Book. Brookside Press ISBN 1-929145-21-7 and ISBN 1-929145-22-5 (electronic edition).
- Fine, Larry (2001). The Piano Book. Brookside Press ISBN 1-929145-01-2
- Kunz, Johannes (2002). Bösendorfer: A Living Legend. Molden Publishing Co. ISBN 3-85485-080-8
