= Ludwig Bösendorfer =

Austrian piano manufacturer

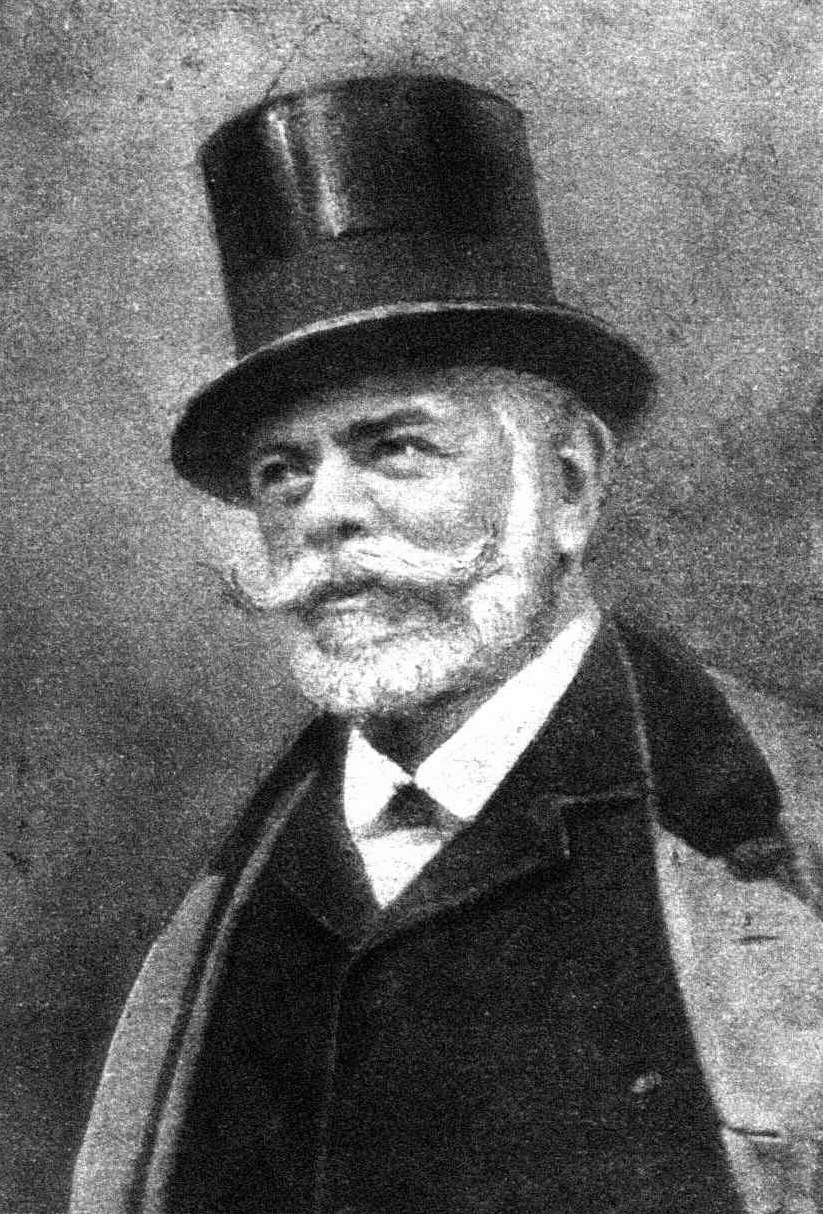
Illustration in Wiener Bilder, 18 May 1919

Ludwig Bösendorfer (10 April 1835 – 9 May 1919) was an Austrian piano manufacturer, son of Ignaz Bösendorfer and inheritor of his father's company Bösendorfer. He modernized the construction of the company's pianos, and made the company well known beyond Austria.

== Life ==
Bösendorfer was born in Vienna in 1835. He attended the Vienna Polytechnic Institute, and then worked in his father's company, taking it over in 1859. In 1860 the company moved to a new factory in Türkenstraße in Alsergrund, Vienna. He moved away from the customary Viennese pianos (described in A Dictionary of Music and Musicians as "the cheaper build and mechanism identified with Vienna"): from 1870, cast iron frames were used in piano construction, and from 1878 he produced pianos with English mechanism.

In 1870 the factory moved to Graf Starhemberggasse in Wieden, Vienna, and the sales rooms moved to Palais Liechtenstein, Herrengasse, in the Innere Stadt, where in 1872 a concert hall, Bösendorfer-Saal, was opened. Famous musicians gave concerts and recitals there, which contributed to the success of the business. He was known to composers including Franz Liszt, Johannes Brahms and Anton Bruckner. Pianos were sold worldwide, and the company supplied pianos to royalty.

From 1870 he was an honorary member of the Gesellschaft der Musikfreunde in Vienna, and from 1878 was one of its directors. In 1889 he initiated the Bösendorfer Piano Competition, which took place annually until 1945. He took part in the 1862 International Exhibition in London, the 1873 Vienna World's Fair and the 1900 Paris Exposition.

Bösendorfer married twice, surviving both wives; there were no children. In 1909 he sold the company to the musician and banker Carl Hutterstrasser. He died in Vienna in 1919, and was buried at the Vienna Central Cemetery.
