= Huang Tiange =

Chinese musician and prodigy (born 2004)

- 黄天戈
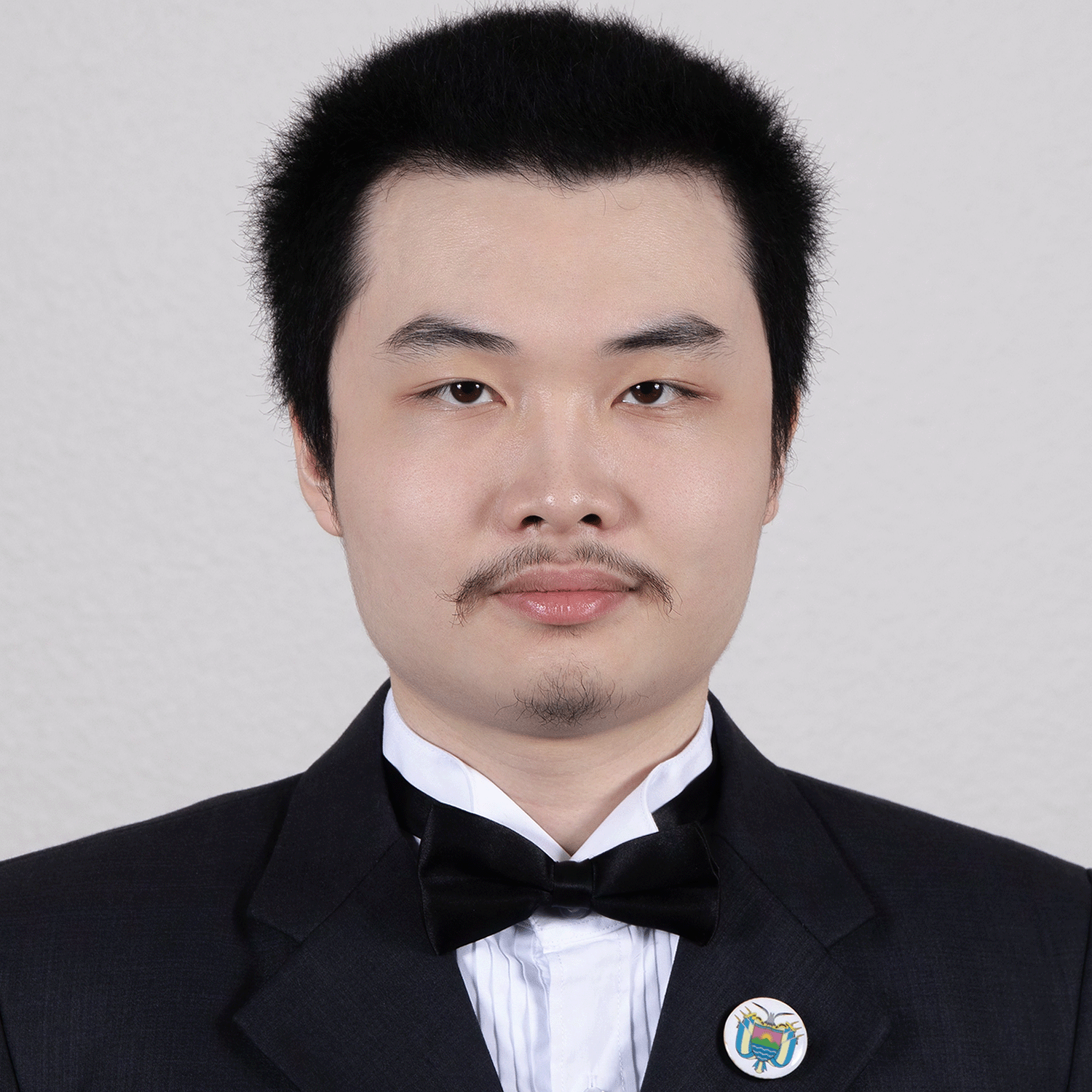
- Born: April 16, 2004 (age 22); Beijing, China
- Citizenship: United States of America
- Occupations: Composer, pianist, music pedagogue
- Parents: Huang Qiuyuan (father); Lin Jing (mother)
- Website: https://huangtiange.com

Huang Tiange (Note: In this Chinese name, the family name is Huang (黄).) (Chinese: 黄天戈) (born April 16, 2004) is a Chinese composer, pianist, educator, and a music prodigy.

== Early life and education ==
Huang Tiange was born into a family of artists in Beijing, China. His father, Professor Huang Qiuyuan is a composer, conductor, and painter. His mother, Lin Jing, is a poet, and in her early years, also a piano teacher and a composer. At the age of three, Huang demonstrated a distinct ability to identify and distinguish notes. At the age of four, Huang begun his formal studies, starting with piano under the instruction of his parents, at age five, music composition conducting under his father. At age seven, he learned the violin self-taught.

Huang debuted in a solo recital entitled Tribute to Bartok on March 25, 2010, on Bartók's 129th birthday, at the age of 5 in Beijing, China, at the 1st Huang Tiange Festival, where he performed works, including multiple China and world premieres, from a variety of composers from Bach, Bartók, Beethoven, Webern, to his father's, Professor Huang Qiuyuan, and his own. Among those in attendance were members of the Hungarian delegation to China in Beijing. As part of the festival, a photographic exhibition entitled Images of Xinjiang was held, along with the publication of his album Huang Tiange — Images of Xinjiang, consisting of images he captured between August and September 2009 in Xinjiang. The occasion received attention from top Chinese media outlets such as the Guangming Daily and Music Weekly in China.

Huang made his concerto debut at age 6, performing Mozart's Piano Concerto No. 23 with the Huang Tiange Festival Orchestra during the 2nd Huang Tiange Festival in Beijing. During the same concert, Huang's first orchestra work Four Tang Poems composed the same year was premiered. This work earned Huang recognition as the youngest composer since Mozart to compose orchestral work for full orchestra. Four Tang Poems later won ASCAP's Morton Gould Young Composers Award when Huang was 8. Four Tang Poems has since been performed by orchestras such as the Brooklyn Symphony Orchestra and others. During the same year, Huang appeared on what at the time was one of China's most watched talk show, Day Day Up on episode 20110624, performing works by Bach and himself, and subsequently went viral in China after the episode's airing.

At age 7, Huang composed his Symphony No. 1, a full length symphony for full orchestra. During the same year, he began composing his String Quartet No. 1.

Huang immigrated to the United States at the age 8, subsequently making his debut during the 4th Huang Tiange Festival in Philadelphia. During the same year, Huang was recognized by the People's Daily as an outstanding prodigy in the field of arts.

In 2014 at the age of 10, Huang made his sold-out New York debut in the same year. While doing so, Huang earned further critical acclaim from the media, with the New York Daily News referred him as "a miniature Mozart", Fox hailed him as "one of the best classical pianists in the world" at "just 10 years old".

In 2019, Huang and his father were invited to season 3 of China Central Television's talk show Talk to the World where the father and son duo were featured in an episode entitled "The Journey Behind the Rise of Music Prodigy Huang Tiange". The same year, Huang released Czerny's Op. 599 Complete on his social media platforms worldwide, which was recorded on his Bösendorfer 225 Grand Piano.

During the COVID-19 pandemic, Huang founded the Dream Piano Institute, which extended his career to music education. Huang has taught student in music composition, piano, solfège, and music theory according to his posts in Chinese social media. Huang states in his website through his teaching methods, his students have been excepted into prestigious music institutions worldwide, such as the Central Conservatory of Music.
