= Kimiko Ishizaka =

German-Japanese pianist

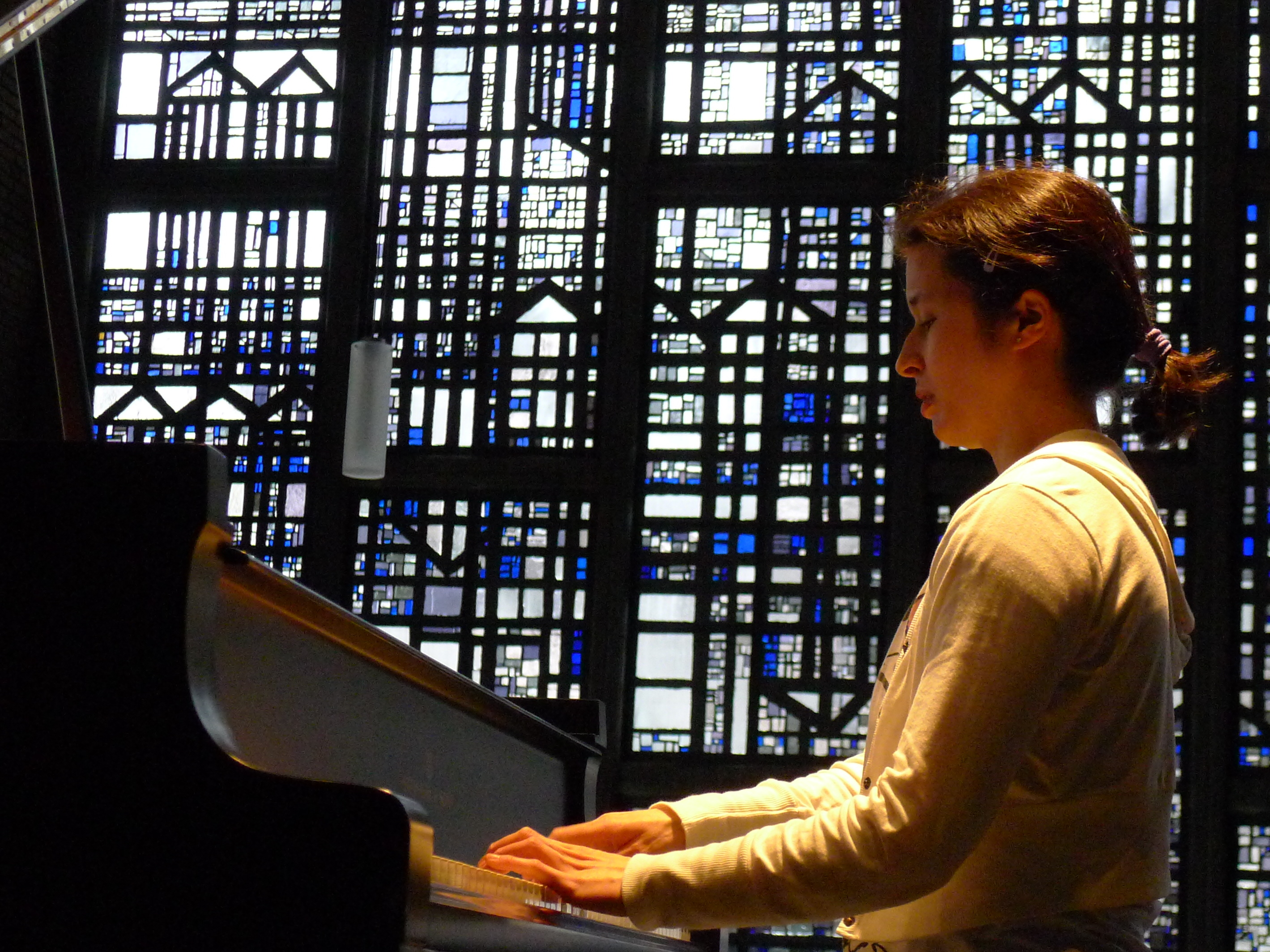
Ishizaka playing in the Trinitatis Church, Bonn, Germany

Kimiko Douglass-Ishizaka (born 4 December 1976) is a German-Japanese composer, pianist, and former Olympic weightlifter and powerlifter.

== Music ==
A performance of the Goldberg Variations

Born in Bonn, Germany, Ishizaka started playing the piano at age four, was a member of the Ishizaka Trio for 16 years with her brothers and graduated from Hochschule für Musik Köln. As a solo pianist, she has performed concerts throughout Europe, North America and Japan, as well as appearing with the Beethoven Orchester Bonn, the Klassische Philharmonie Bonn and the Jackson Symphony Orchestra (Michigan).

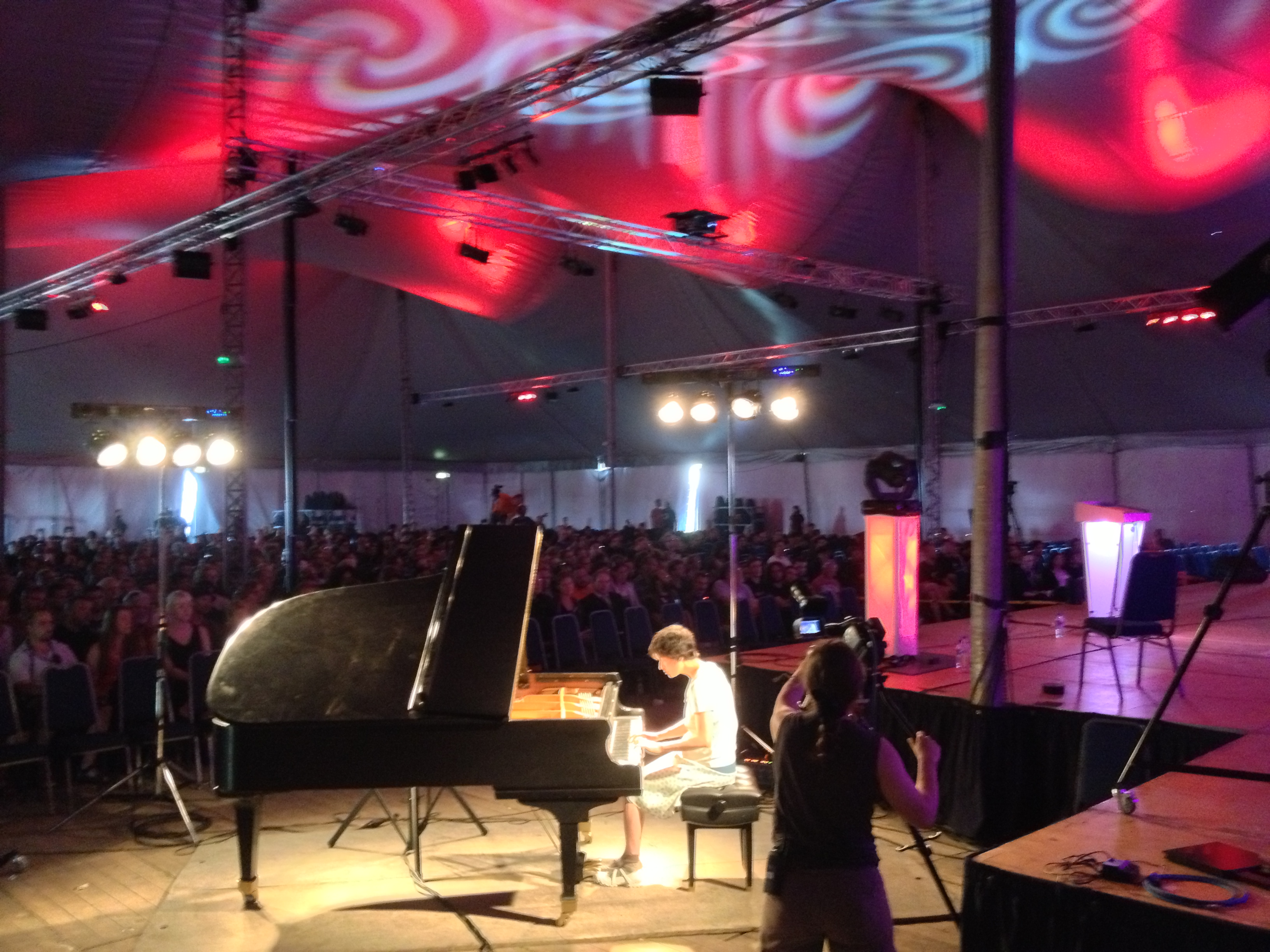
Ishizaka performing at the O.H.M. festival in the Netherlands, 2013

In 1998 Ishizaka won the Deutscher Musikwettbewerb (German Music Competition), along with her brothers Kiyondo Ishizaka and Danjulo Ishizaka.

Ishizaka is part of the Open Goldberg Variations, a Kickstarter-funded, and Bösendorfer-sponsored team that recorded Johann Sebastian Bach's Goldberg Variations and released the score and recordings into the public domain in May 2012.

Ishizaka's interpretation is characterised by straightforward musicianship, immaculate technical aplomb, and a warm, beautifully modulated sonority. Counterpoint passes back and forth between the hands in a conversational and judiciously balanced manner, while a strong lyrical impulse informs the cross-handed variations' rapid, bravura passages.

— Jed Distler, Gramophone Magazine

The Well-Tempered Clavier - Fugue No. 19 in A major (BWV 864)

In November 2013 Ishizaka and Open Goldberg Project completed another Kickstarter project to fund the recording Book I of Bach's Well-Tempered Clavier. The new recording was released into the public domain in March 2015.

In Gramophone, Donald Rosenberg wrote, "She scales her Bach to the rhythmic, structural and sonic needs of the music, without touching the sustaining pedal."

James Oestreich, reviewing for The New York Times, reported that Ishizaka is a "gifted and obviously devoted Bachian" and that she "performed the 24 preludes and fugues of Book 1 from memory and without major flaw".

In April 2015, Ishizaka began another Kickstarter-funded project to record Chopin's 24 préludes on an 1842 Pleyel piano. The recordings were released under a Creative Commons license.

The Art of Fugue, BWV 1080 - 20 Fuga a3 Soggetti (completion by Ishizaka)

Ishizaka made her debut as a composer on March 19, 2016, with her performance of Bach's The Art of the Fugue featuring her own completion of the final fugue. In 2017, she then recorded a version, including her completion, and released it under a Creative Commons license, available for download in audiophile quality from her website.

On October 1, 2019, Ishizaka released her album New Me! on her website on the platform Bandcamp.

== Weightlifting ==
Ishizaka explained in an interview that she began weightlifting after a convicted bank robber encouraged her to work out with free weights instead of relying on exercise machines and similar devices:

He had learned in prison that real physical power comes from whole-body exercises such as the squat and deadlift. When I showed alacrity and some talent for the pursuit, he introduced me to a retired Persian weightlifting champion who managed to instill a sense of the purity and respect for the sport. I eventually moved to Cologne from Bonn to be near the weightlifting club, carefully choosing an apartment within walking distance so that I could train four days a week."

Her weight training led to a change in her pianistic technique:

In my early 20s, I had very thin arms—I couldn't get a beautiful sound out of the piano and I got very tired playing, say, two Chopin études in a row. As I got stronger, I found a way of using my shoulders, arms, and back to produce the sound. These days I only use my fingers for support."

She trains with 265lb of weights after practicing piano to maintain her piano performance level.

=== Powerlifting ===
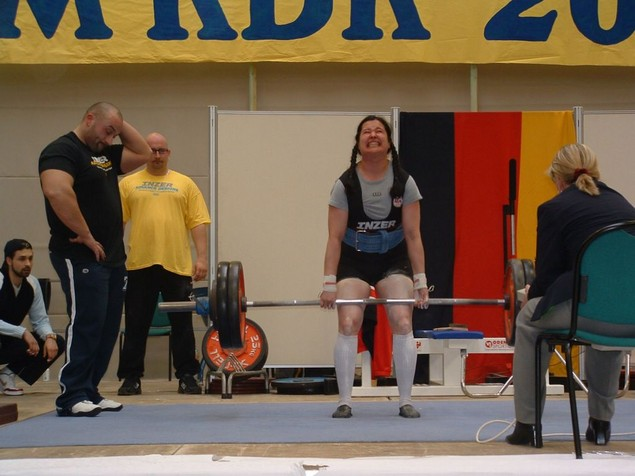
Ishizaka performing the deadlift at the 2005 German Championships in Powerlifting

Ishizaka placed 3rd in the weight category < 82 kg in the 2005 German championships in powerlifting and in 2006 placed 2nd in the disciplines of bench press, squat and deadlift.

=== Olympic weightlifting ===
Ishizaka won three medals at the 2008 German championships in Olympic weightlifting.

In the spring of 2008 she placed 5th in the ELEIKO Women's Grand Prix in Niederöblarn, Austria, in the 63 kg class.

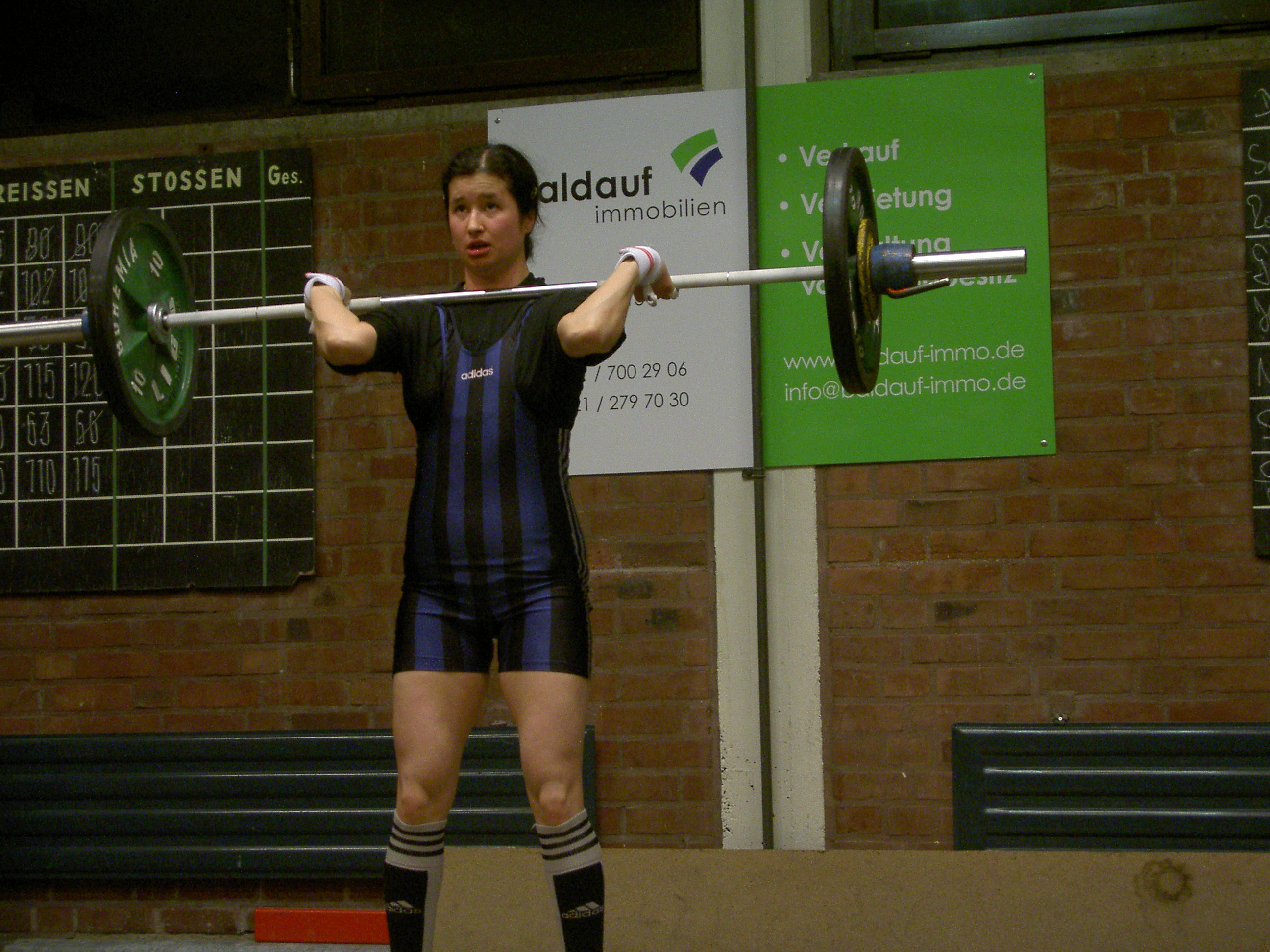
Ishizaka performing the clean and jerk
