= Bösendorfer-Saal =

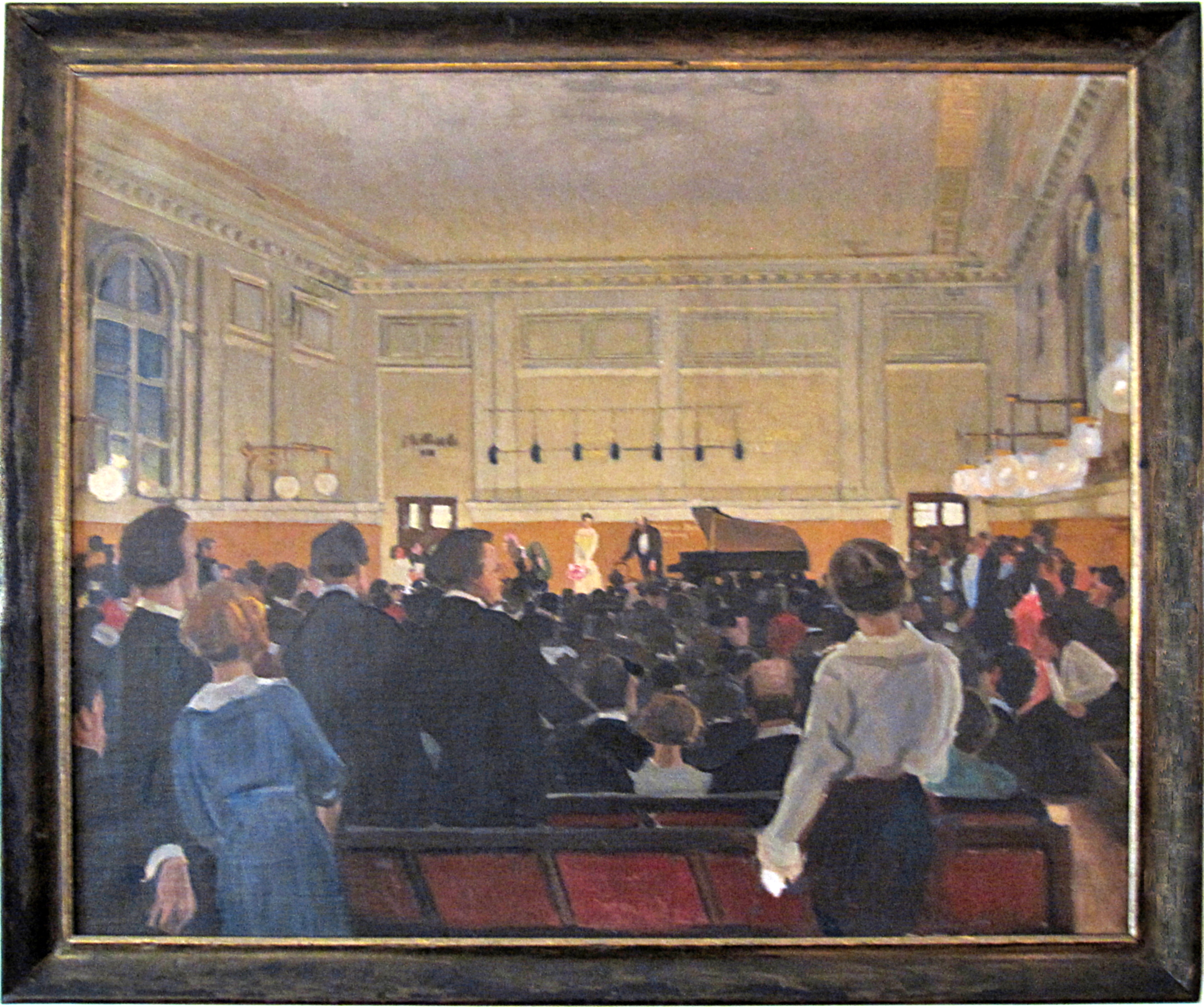
- Depiction of a concert in the hall
- Interactive map of the Bösendorfer-Saal area

General information
- Location: Herrengasse, Vienna, Austria
- Coordinates: 48°12′32.33″N 16°21′58.97″E
- Opened: 1872
- Demolished: 1913

Bösendorfer-Saal (Bösendorfer Hall) was a concert hall in Vienna, Austria, on Herrengasse in the Innere Stadt of the city. Connected with the Viennese piano manufacturer Bösendorfer, it was opened in 1872, and many famous musicians performed there. The building was demolished in 1913.

Since 1983, concert venues elsewhere in Vienna have been named Bösendorfer-Saal.

== History ==
The concert hall was created in the former riding stables of Palais Liechtenstein, Herrengasse, the location of the sale-rooms of the company, and the home of Ludwig Bösendorfer (1835–1919), son of the founder Ignaz Bösendorfer and inheritor of the business. It was opened on 19 November 1872 by the pianist Hans von Bülow.

The hall seated about 600 people. It was a venue for piano recitals, song recitals and chamber music, and it was famous for its good acoustics. Among the performers were Eugen d'Albert, Ferruccio Busoni, Fritz Kreisler, Franz Liszt, Ignaz Paderewski, Max Reger, Anton Rubinstein, Pablo Sarasate and Hugo Wolf. More than 4,500 concerts took place.

The building was demolished in 1913, after Prince Liechtenstein sold the building to a construction company. For a time the site remained undeveloped; in 1933 a multi-storey building was constructed.

== Other Bösendorfer halls in Vienna ==
In November 1983, a new concert hall for chamber music, seating 150, was opened in the company's factory building in Graf Starhemberggasse in Wieden, where pianos had been made since 1870.

Manufacturing moved away from Wieden in 2010, and the concert hall closed. In that year a venue for concerts and other events at Mozarthaus Vienna, in a Baroque vault, was named Bösendorfer-Saal, by arrangement with the Bösendorfer company.
