= Imperial Bösendorfer =

97-key grand piano

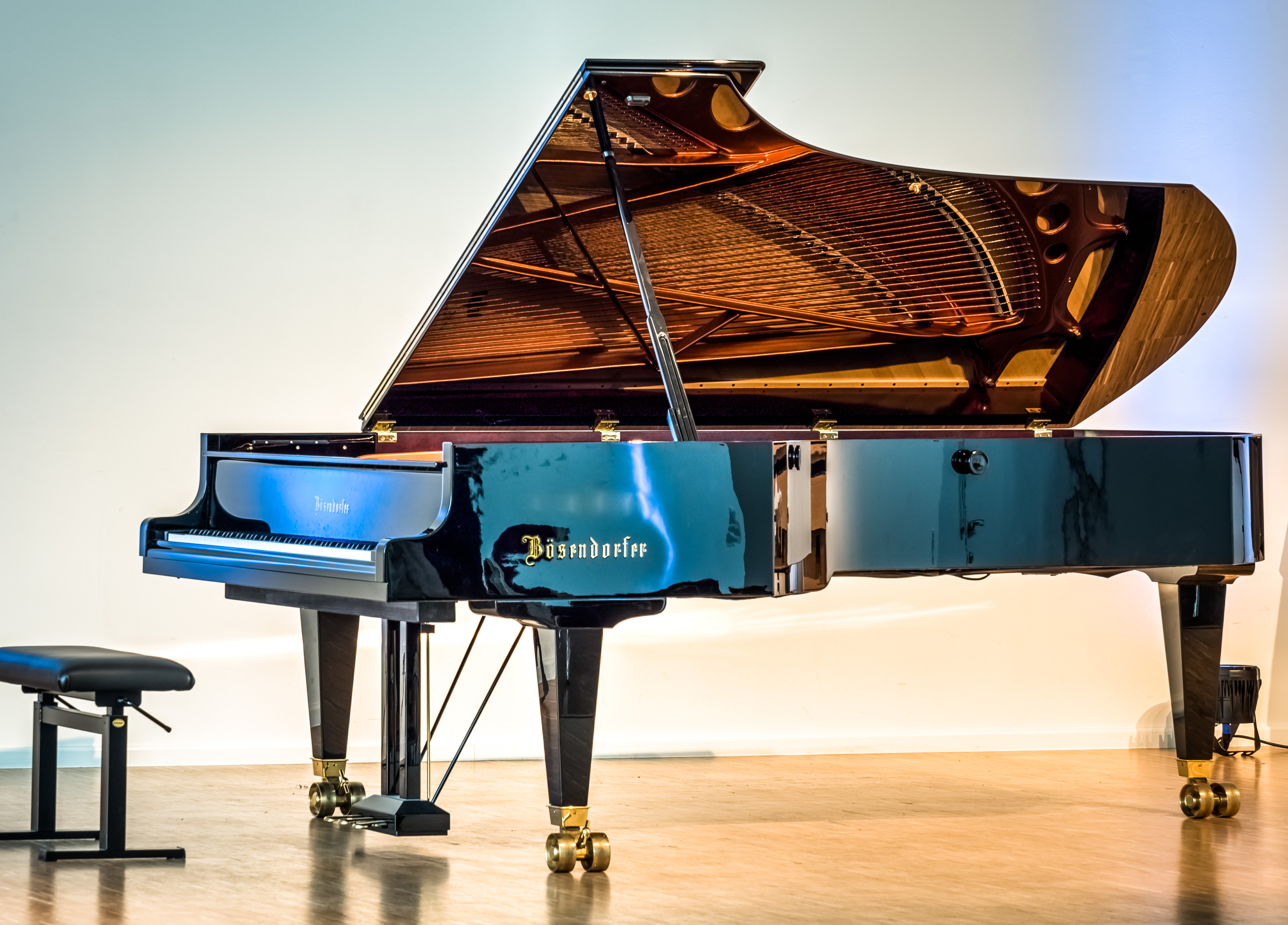
Imperial Bösendorfer in the Music Hall of the University of Bamberg

The Bösendorfer Model 290 Imperial, or Imperial Bösendorfer (also colloquially known as the 290), is the largest model and flagship piano manufactured by Bösendorfer, at around 290 cm (9 ft 6 in) long, 175 cm (5 ft 9 in) wide, and weighing 552 kg (1,217 lb). It has an eight-octave range from C_{0} to C_{8}. For 90 years it was the only concert grand piano in the world with 97 keys, until it was joined in 1990 by the instruments of Stuart & Sons of Australia. Music critic Melinda Bargreen has described the Imperial as the ne plus ultra of pianos, while pianist Garrick Ohlsson dubbed it the "Rolls-Royce of pianos".

== Extra keys ==
Bösendorfer built the first Imperial in 1909, following a suggestion by composer Ferruccio Busoni to build a model with an extended range. Busoni sought to extend the range to accommodate his transcription of Johann Sebastian Bach's organ works. In order to emulate the 32 foot registers available on some large organs, he needed the entire octave down to C_{0}. For instance, the final page of Busoni's transcription of Bach's "St. Anne" fugue, BWV 552, contains the notes A♭_{0} and G_{0}.

The Bösendorfer Imperial features 97 keys: a full eight octaves. This is in contrast to their other extended model, the Bösendorfer 225, which has 92 keys (down to F_{0}). The extra keys, which are all at the bass end of the keyboard (that is, to the left), are colored black so that the pianist can tell them apart from the normal keys of an 88-key piano. They were originally covered with a removable panel to prevent a pianist from accidentally playing the extra notes. While the keys are seldom used, the extra bass strings create additional harmonic resonance that contributes to an overall richer sound. Compositions have been written specifically to use the extra keys. Pianist and University of Washington School of Music director Robin McCabe explains the challenge of adjusting to the extra keys: "One's 'southern sight-lines,' so to speak, can be seriously skewed because of the extra footage in the bass. Ending a piece such as Debussy's L'isle joyeuse, for example, with its nose-dive final gesture to the low A of the piano, becomes a bit more problematic when that A is not the lowest note on the piano!" Reportedly, "[the] 290 has proved a bit of a temperamental star, sounding harsh and jarring in the hands of pianists who do not understand how to play it and marvellously refined in the hands of those who do".

== Pricing and availability ==
Bösendorfer Imperial Concert Grand pianos, handcrafted in Austria, retail for between US$256,000 and $560,000 in the U.S., depending on finish, design and whether the Disklavier Enspire computer reproducing system is installed. (Bösendorfer's CEUS reproducing system, "Create Emotions with Unique Sound", developed in-house, is more expensive still.) In 1977, the price was reported to be $35,000, $186,000 in 2025 adjusted for inflation.

While the concert piano market is dominated by Steinway & Sons, which signs prominent artists to a performance agreement and urges them to refrain from playing any other piano brand, performers preferring the Bösendorfer Imperial will often have that piano shipped with them while on tour.

== Notable composers and performers ==
- Tori Amos
- Wilhelm Backhaus
- Paul Badura-Skoda
- Victor Borge
- Malcolm Frager
- Keith Jarrett
- Valentina Lisitsa
- Garrick Ohlsson
- Charlemagne Palestine
- Oscar Peterson
- Terry Riley
- Carol Rosenberger
- András Schiff
- Wibi Soerjadi
- Cecil Taylor
- La Monte Young
- Frank Zappa
