= Open Goldberg Variations =

Project of recording and score of Goldberg Variations

Variatio 19. a 1 Clav.
Performed by Kimiko Douglass-Ishizaka

The Open Goldberg Variations is a non-profit project that created a high quality studio recording and typeset score of Johann Sebastian Bach's Goldberg Variations, and placed them directly into the public domain. By releasing an entirely free version of the classical masterpiece, the project aims to change a common problem: in theory, classical music is a common property due to advanced age, yet it is hard to find quality recordings of it online due to copyrighted restrictions on the performances. Open Goldberg Variations cemented a free, quality version into the public domain, making the music available for everyone and everything, including schools, universities, musicians, private persons and even commercial productions.

To ensure a high quality, the typeset was produced using open-source technology and an open peer reviewing process that allows everyone to edit the script and suggest improvements. Open Goldberg Variations embraces open standards and coined the term "Open Source Bach" in reference to the ideals of open-source software.

The score and the recording were released into the public domain using the Creative Commons Zero (CC0) license tool on 28 May 2012.

== Production ==
The creation of the new score was responsible for significant advancements in the state of the art for open source music notation software. Two rounds of public, online peer review were utilized to spot errors and inconsistencies in the new score, as compared to Bach's manuscript. Jamie Lughlin of The Dallas Observer underscored the need for a high-quality, public domain version of the score, saying "Unless a brand new score is crafted and gifted to the public, such as in this case, with all parties involved volunteering his or her time and signing over their rights to future kickbacks, the classics cannot be accessible to everyone."

Pianist Kimiko Douglass-Ishizaka supported the project by performing the 85-minute piece for the recording, including a five-day session in the Teldex Studio of Berlin.

== Score following ==
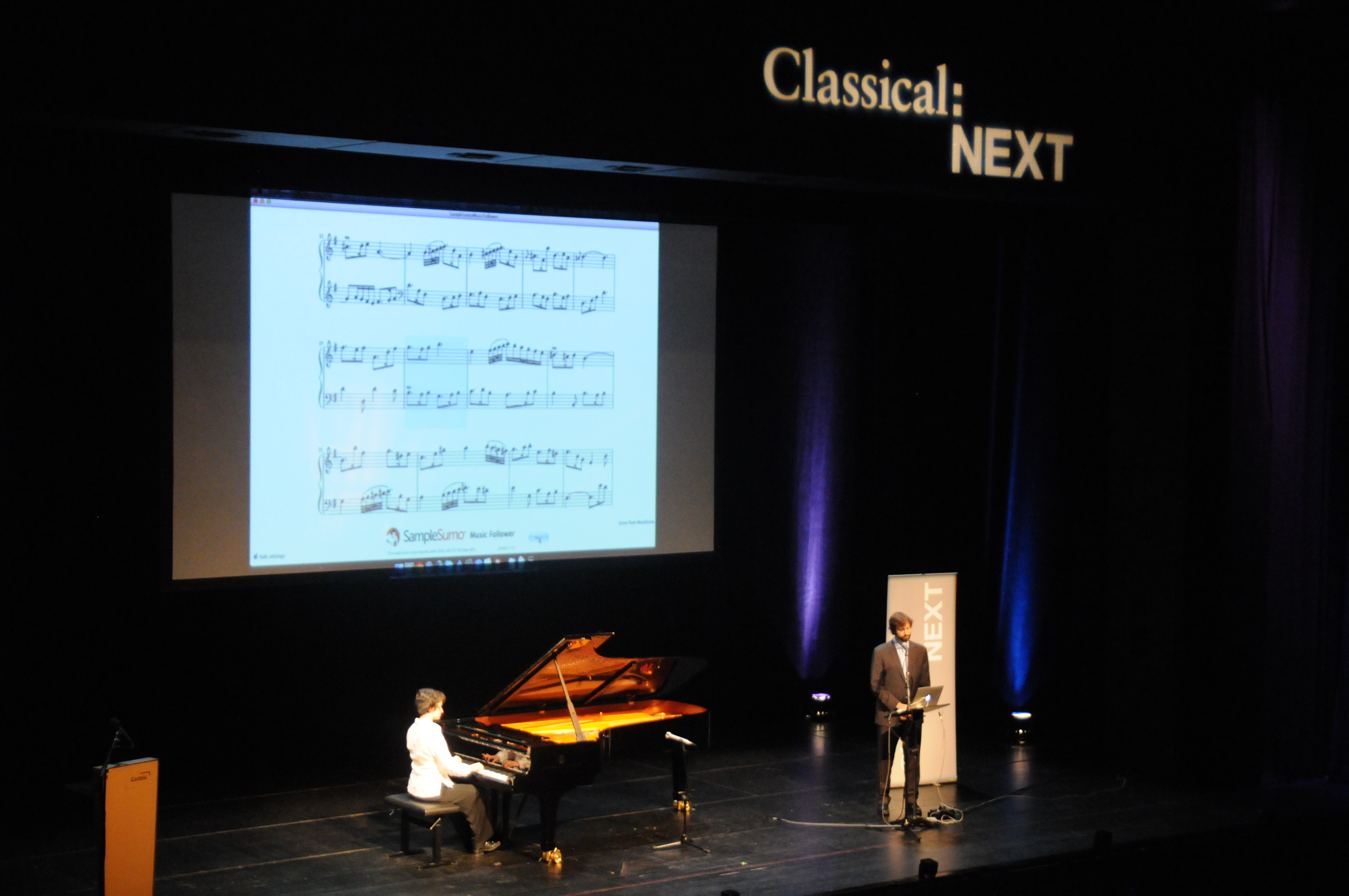
Ishizaka performing the piece at Classical:NEXT conference 2012

As part of the project the team developed a digital score that allows people to read the notes while they are being played. The technology recognizes which notes are being played and people can follow along with live performances using their smart phones and other digital devices. The digital version has two major implications for the way music is being produced, used and distributed online:

1. It separates music notes from traditional paper, allowing people to edit, alter and share music online. This social component was a key factor for ensuring a high quality of the score, allowing people to review, improve and change the score in the course of on open peer reviewing process.
2. The digital version also changes the way people use and experience music, adding a visual layer to audio content. For example, it can be used in schools or universities to visualise music as it is being played, or it can be embedded into websites to extend radio programmes. On 24 June 2012, Wisconsin Public Radio broadcast the Open Goldberg Variations to their radio audience and simultaneously provided the score on their website, where the audience was able to follow the notes being played, have measures highlighted, and pages turned automatically, synchronized with the music from the radio.

== See also ==
- Musopen
