= Ignaz Bösendorfer =

Austrian musician and piano manufacturer (1796–1859)

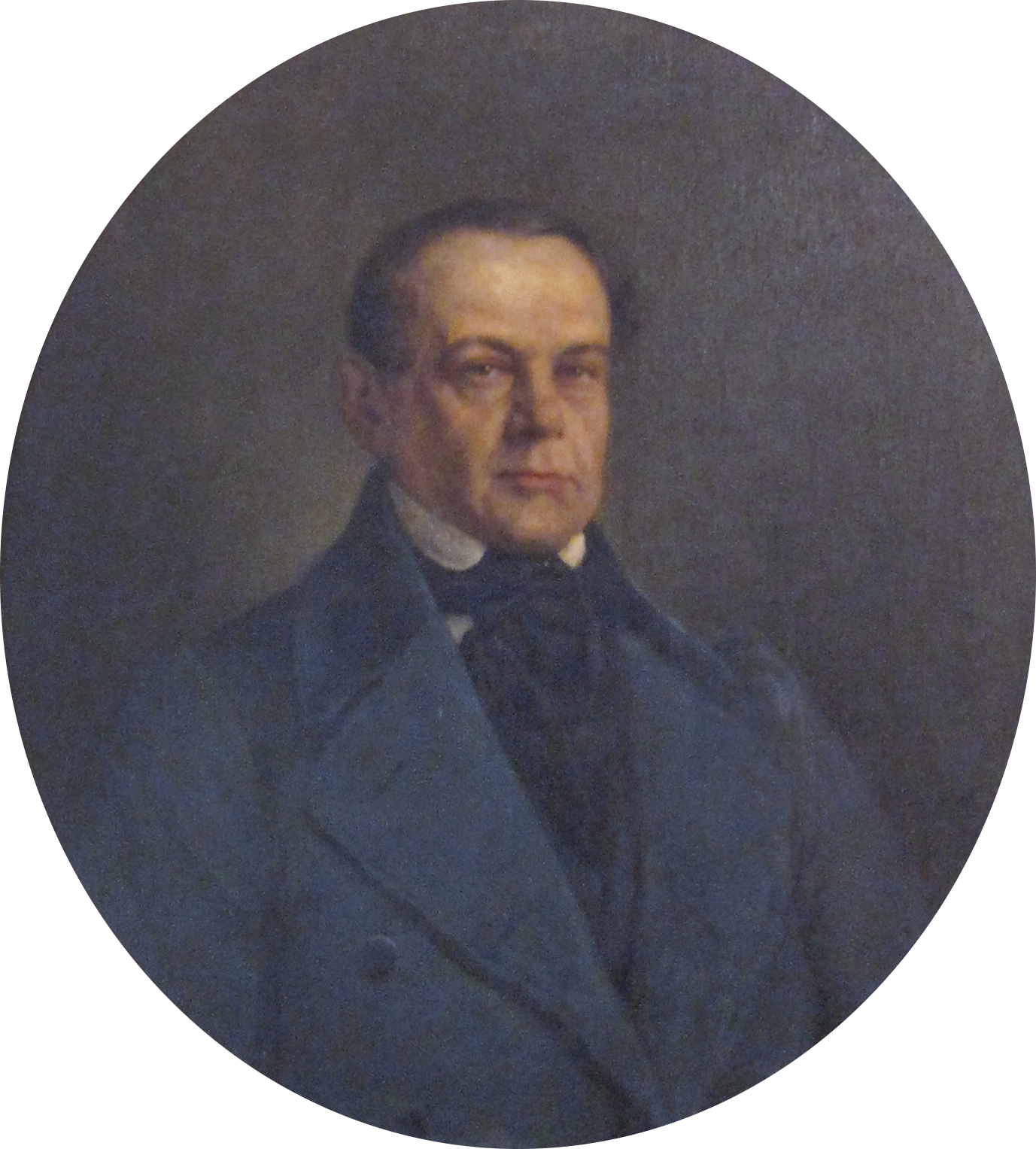
Ignaz Bösendorfer, based on lithograph by Josef Kriehuber, 1859

Ignaz Bösendorfer (July 28, 1796 – April 14, 1859) was an Austrian musician and piano manufacturer, who in 1828 founded the Bösendorfer company in Vienna-Josefstadt.

== Biography ==
The son of a carpenter, he studied at the Academy of Fine Arts Vienna and did an apprenticeship with the renowned piano manufacturer Joseph Brodmann (1763–1848), whose workshop he took over in 1828. He received the concession for his business by the Vienna city administration on July 28, commonly regarded as the founding date of the Bösendorfer company. His venture quickly expanded, as grand pianos became an increasingly popular status symbol for home concerts held by the nobility and wealthy bourgeoisie of the Austrian Empire.

Bösendorfer could combine his craftmanship skills and experience with a great musical expertise. His pianos were of high repute, the "Vienna mechanics" design helped provide a strong and vibrant sound. His close relationship with Franz Liszt, who by his flamboyant playing demanded the highest standards of piano making, ensured the success of his creations. In 1839 he received the award of an imperial and royal warrant of appointment by Emperor Ferdinand I of Austria. After his death, his son Ludwig Bösendorfer took over the firm.

One of the first grand pianos built by Bösendorfer signed Ig. Besendorfer Schüler des Brodmann in Wien Josephstadt 43 is on display at Millstatt Abbey, where it is regularly played in concerts.
