= Bochow =

Bochow is a surname. Notable people with the surname include:

- Frank Bochow (1937–2012), East German trade unionist and diplomat
- Michael Bochow (born 1948), German sociologist
- Wolfgang Bochow (1944–2017), German badminton player
- Hansi Bochow-Blüthgen (1897–1983), German author, editor, and translator
