= Hans-Georg Stümke =

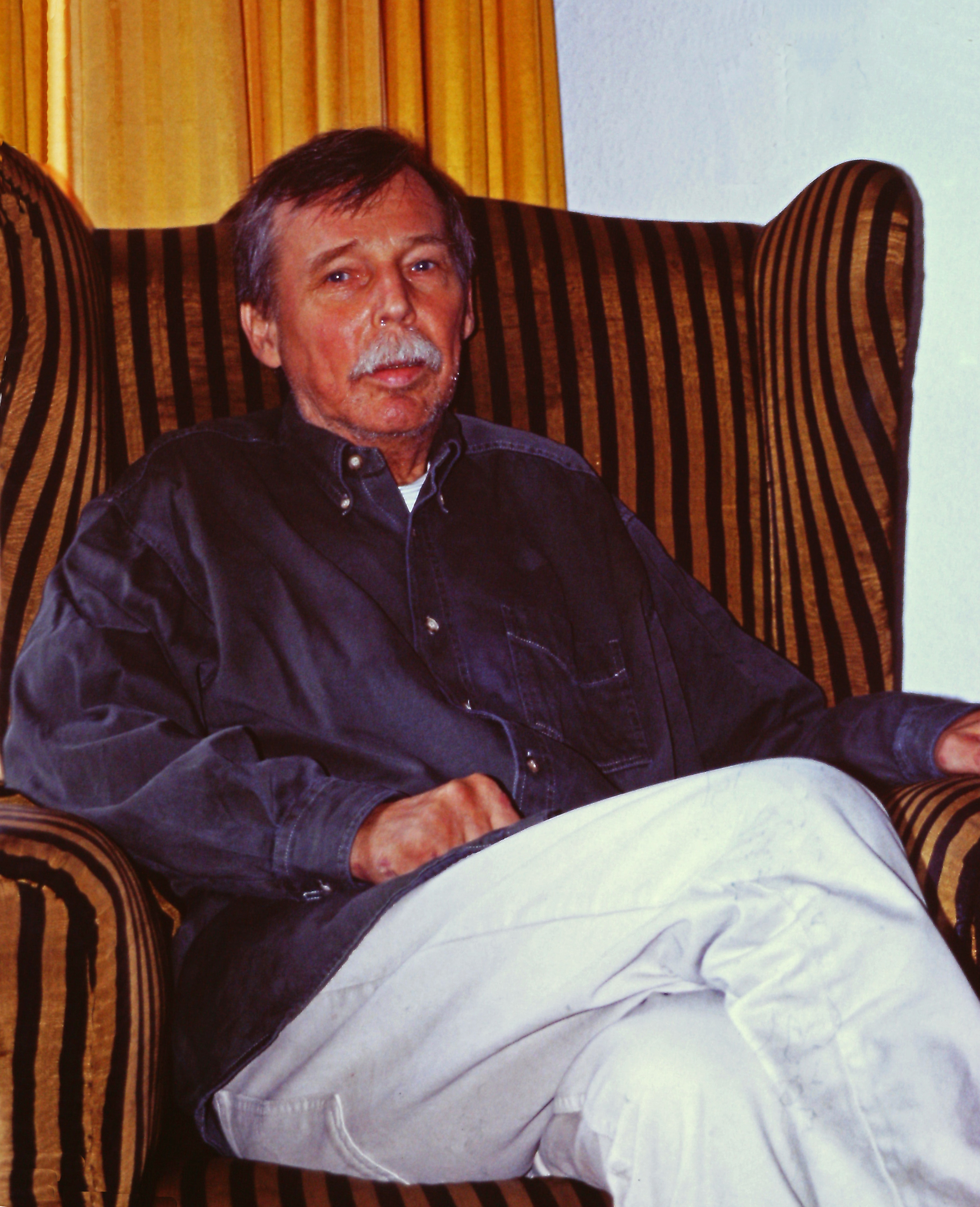
Stümke in his Berlin apartment

Hans-Georg Stümke (16 September 1941 in Königsberg – 29 September 2002 in Berlin) was a German gay activist, author, and historian.

The son of an army officer, Stümke grew up in Celle, Lower Saxony, and worked first as a meteorologist for the German army. He returned to school to complete his secondary education and enrolled at the Free University of Berlin to study history. In the early 1960s, he came out as a gay man, and he was an LGBT activist in the 1970s. Stümke was among the first to report in West Germany about the Stonewall riots in New York City, which helped spark the founding of the nationwide gay rights movement. In the following years he was active in the LSVD and authored pioneering books about German gay history and gay seniors. His humorous travel guide to Playa del Ingles, Gran Canaria, went through numerous printings in German and was translated into English. He died of cancer in 2002 and is buried in the Alter St.-Matthäus-Kirchhof cemetery in Berlin.

== Works by Stümke ==
- Älter werden wir umsonst. Schwules Leben jenseits der Dreißig. Erfahrungen. Berlin: Verlag rosa Winkel, 1998. ISBN 3-86149-071-4 (Interviews and essays by Michael Bochow, Rainer Hoffmann, Rüdiger Lautmann, and Michael Schmidt.)
- Homosexuelle in Deutschland. Eine politische Geschichte. Munich: C.H. Beck, 1989. ISBN 3-406-33130-0
- Rosa Winkel, rosa Listen. Homosexuelle und "gesundes Volksempfinden" von Auschwitz bis heute. Reinbek: Rowohlt, 1981. ISBN 3-499-14827-7 (Coauthored with Rudi Finkler.)
- Elvira Klöppelschuh (pseudonym), Elvira auf Gran Canaria. Urlaub, Schwule, Strand und Tand. Berlin: Verlag rosa Winkel, 1994. ISBN 978-3-86149-039-5
  - English translation: Elvira Totterheels (pseudonym), Elvira in Gran Canaria: Sea, Sun, Sand and a New Pair of Shoes. Transl. by Ashley Lancaster. Berlin: Verlag rosa Winkel, 2002. ISBN 3-86149-039-0
