= Lusthaus (Vienna) =

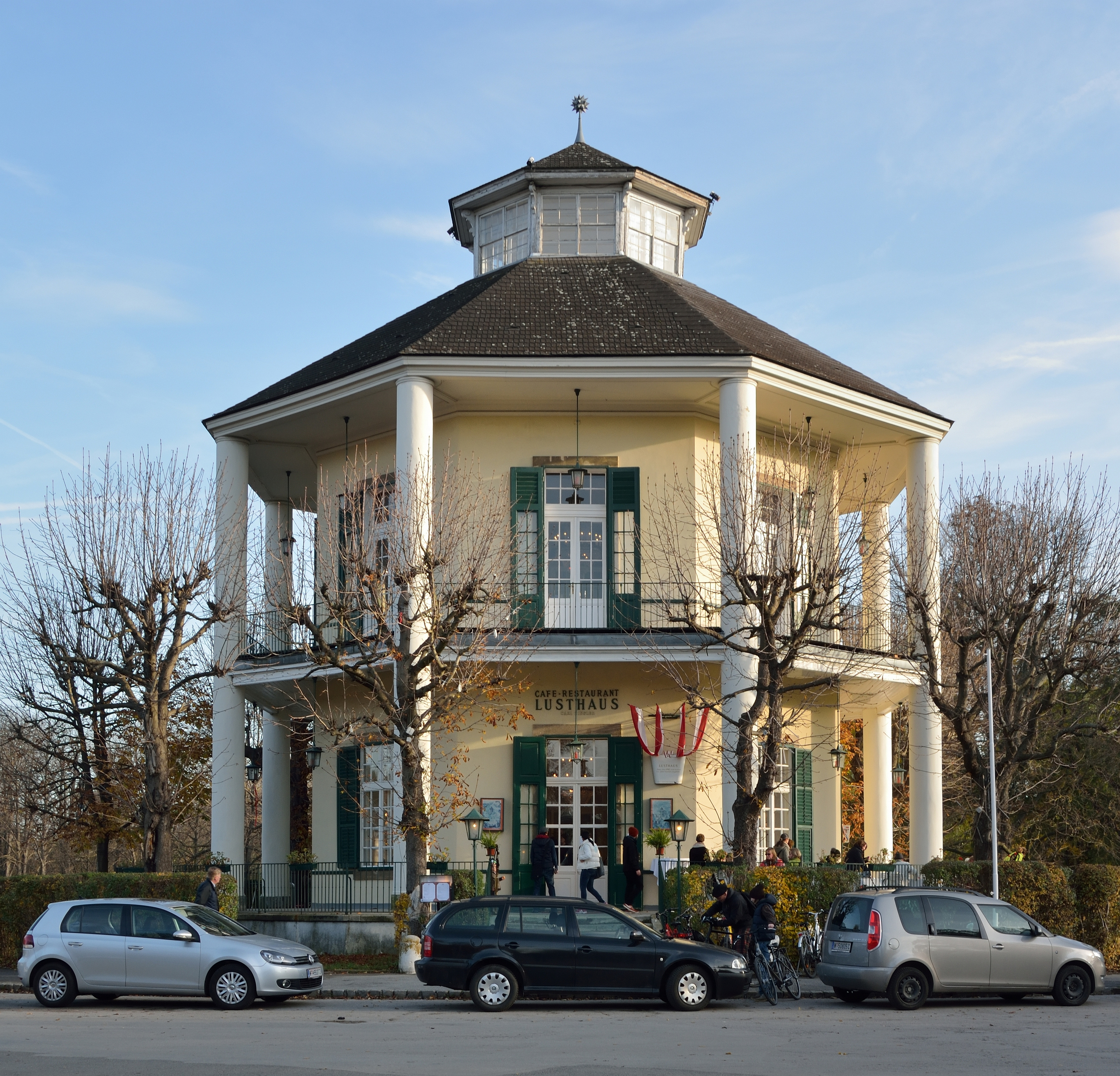
- The Lusthaus (2014)

- Location within Vienna Location within Austria

General information
- Location: Freudenau 254, 1020 Vienna, Austria
- Coordinates: 48°11′33″N 16°26′20″E
- Opened: 1538
- Renovated: 1948

Website
- www.lusthaus-wien.at

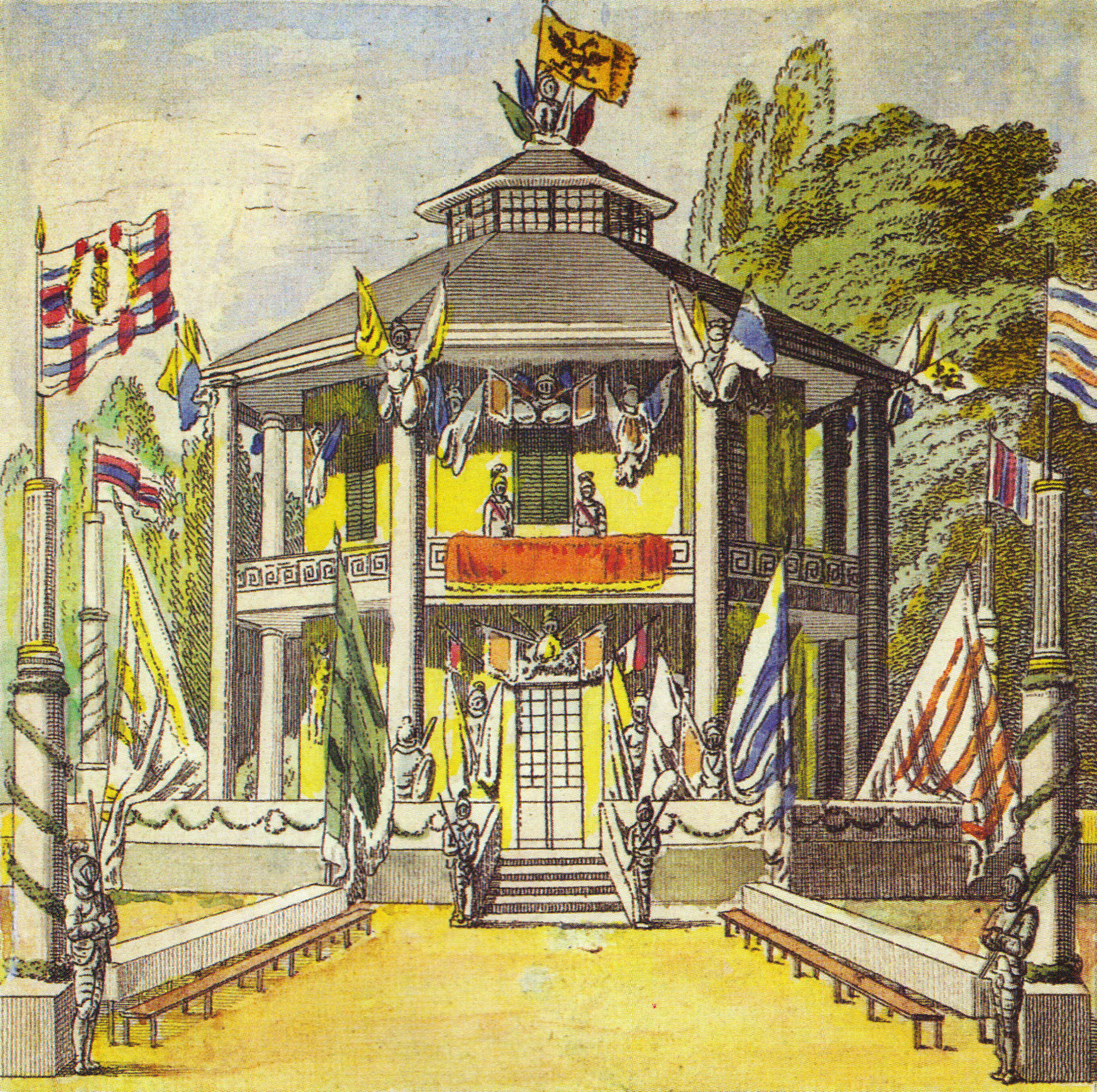
The Lusthaus in Vienna on October 18, 1814. Engraving by Heinrich Friedrich Müller, showing festive decorations on the occasion of the anniversary of the Battle of Leipzig.

The Lusthaus is a historic building in Prater park in the Leopoldstadt district of Vienna, Austria. It is located at the southeastern end of Prater Avenue, near the Freudenau racecourse (German: Galopprennbahn Freudenau).

First mentioned in 1560 as Casa Verde, the green summer house served as a hunting lodge in Vienna's Prater, which was then a hunting ground. It was built in 1538, at the location where Prater Avenue met the Danube Canal. The Lusthaus was on the water until 1834, when the Danube Canal was moved.

After the Prater was opened to the public in 1766, the summer house was rebuilt from 1781 to 1783. It served as the location for large celebrations and festivities, such as the imperial celebrations to mark the first anniversary of the Battle of Leipzig, in which Napoleon was defeated.

In the 19th century, the Lusthaus, as well as the entire Prater, was a popular meeting place for the nobility and bourgeoisie. During the First World War, the military bridge guard tasked with protecting the Danube bridge from sabotage was stationed in the summer house. In the inter-war period marked by economic instability and poverty, the composition of its patrons shifted; the Lusthaus then served as a bar with dance and music. During the Second World War, the Lusthaus was almost completely destroyed by bombings in 1944 and 1945. However, by 1948, a decision was taken to rebuild the building, and the city of Vienna earmarked a sum of 350,000 schillings for its repair. During reconstruction, the building was restored to its 18th-century shape. In October 1949, the Lusthaus was reopened.

Today, the Lusthaus houses a coffeehouse and a restaurant.
