= Prater Violet =

1945 novel by Christopher Isherwood

- First edition
- Author: Christopher Isherwood
- Language: English
- Genre: literary fiction
- Publisher: Random House
- Publication date: 1945
- Publication place: United Kingdom
- Media type: Print (Hardback & Paperback)

Prater Violet is Christopher Isherwood's 1945 fictional first person account of film-making. The Prater is a large park and amusement park in Vienna, a city important to characters in the novel for several reasons. Though Isherwood broke onto the literary scene as a novelist, he eventually worked in Hollywood as a screenwriter. In this novel, Isherwood comments on life, art, commercialization of art and Nazism.

== Structure ==
A short novel without chapter divisions, Prater Violet follows Isherwood's involvement in the creation of the eponymous film. Much of the novel records the remarks of people working in the film industry and Isherwood's conversations with a brilliant Austrian film director, Friedrich Bergmann. Only at the conclusion of the novel does Isherwood significantly separate his voice from the stream of dialogue to provide a deeper commentary and to ask, "What makes you go on living? Why don't you kill yourself? Why is all this bearable? What makes you bear it?" (154).

== Themes ==
The novel depicts England before the Second World War, the rise of Nazism and the world of film-making. Isherwood uses his characters to express varying views about Hitler, and most are shown to be alarmingly indifferent.

== Characters ==
=== Major characters ===
- Christopher "Chris" Isherwood (writer)
- Friedrich Bergmann (director)
- Mr Chatsworth (producer)
- Sandy Ashmeade (story editor)
- Dorothy (secretary)

=== Minor characters ===
Mr Patterson (journalist), Lawrence Dwight (headcutter), Fred Murray (gaffer), Mr Harris (art director), Mr Watts (lighting technician), Mr Pfeffer (musical director), Roger (sound recordist), Teddy (boomer), Joyce (continuity girl), Clark (clapper boy), Jack (camera man), Eliot (assistant director), Timmy (make-up man), Anita Hayden (actress), Arthur Cromwell (actor), Eddie Kennedy (director)

The main character, Isherwood himself, is a moderately successful author of fiction. He is a close observer of the film-making process and the gathering war. Eventually he becomes frustrated by his rather passive role in life, but finds consolation in the dramatic personalities he meets.

Friedrich Bergmann is a film director. Just as Isherwood translates Bergmann's poor English into film script, Isherwood comes to understand the true horror of Nazism through Bergmann's fear for his family in Austria.

As Hitler lays the foundation for war, movie executives such as Mr Chatsworth stress over the timely production of the film Prater Violet.

Ashmeade, the story editor, who we are led to believe is Isherwood's first, meaningless lover, and Dorothy, the secretary, both fade into a cast of minor characters who fail to comprehend the truth of life.

The only exception to this monochrome cast is Lawrence Dwight, the head cutter at Imperial Bulldog Pictures. He sees life as a quest for efficiency through establishing patterns.

== Major themes ==
- Efficiency
- Art
- The Creative Process
- Film-as-art
- Film-as-entertainment
- Nazism
- Love

== Based on Isherwood's film work ==
Prater Violet is based on Isherwood's experience as a screenwriter on the British Gaumont film Little Friend (1934), directed by Berthold Viertel, and starring Matheson Lang and Nova Pilbeam.
