= Hansi Bochow-Blüthgen =

German author, editor, and translator

Hansi Bochow-Blüthgen (2 January 1897 in Berlin-Charlottenburg – 30 August 1983 in Munich; actually Hanna Dora Margarethe, née Blüthgen; pen name: Lore Wiesner) was a German writer, editor, and translator in the Post-war years.

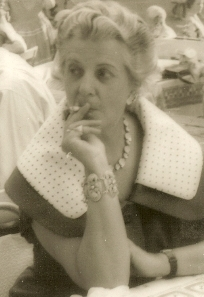
Hansi Bochow-Blüthgen (1897–1983)

== Life and work ==
Bochow-Blüthgen, was married to the journalist Friedrich Walter Bochow (1889–1946) from the mid-1920s, was the granddaughter of the illustrator Fedor Flinzer and niece of the lyricist Victor Blüthgen (1844–1920). The photographer Gisèle Freund and the writer Moshe Ya'akov Ben-Gavriel (1891–1965), who dedicated Bochow-Blüthgen his story Ein Löwe hat den Mond verschluckt, were among her friends.

Bochow-Blüthgen worked on their first training as a librarian. She gained recognition through numerous translations from English and American. Among her best known translations into German is Frühstück bei Tiffany (Breakfast at Tiffany's) by Truman Capote. Her sensitive translation was very successful. However, it was called advanced in years (betagt) in the Frankfurter Allgemeine Zeitung half a century after publication. Another famous translation from Bochow-Blüthgen is Der Kardinal (The Cardinal) by Henry Morton Robinson. 50 years after its appearance on the German book market, it was characterized as a Bestseller in best translation (Bestseller in Bestübersetzung) in the Süddeutsche Zeitung. Further translations from Bochow-Blüthgen are Praterveilchen (Prater Violet) by Christopher Isherwood, Sturmwind – Flickas Sohn (Thunderhead) by Mary O'Hara, and Tien Pao ein Chinesenjunge (The House of Sixty Fathers) by Meindert DeJong. Apart from this, Bochow-Blüthgen translated texts by William Makepeace Thackeray, Katherine Anne Porter, and Patricia Highsmith into German.

== Works (selection) ==
- Biggers, Earl Derr, Das schwarze Kamel (The Black Camel), Leipzig: Ernst Oldenburg 1930
- Caldwell, Taylor, Melissa, Berlin: Blanvalet 1950
- Capote, Truman, Frühstück bei Tiffany (Breakfast at Tiffany's), Wiesbaden: Limes 1959
- Capote, Truman, Lokalkolorit (Local Color), Wiesbaden: Limes 1960
- Capote, Truman, Die Musen sprechen. Mit Porgy and Bess in Rußland (The Muses Are Heard), Wiesbaden: Limes 1961
- Dedijer, Vladimir, Tito, Berlin: Ullstein 1953
- DeJong, Meindert, Tien Pao, ein Chinesenjunge. Eine ergreifende Geschichte (The House of Sixty Fathers), Köln: Schaffstein 1958
- Forbes, Kathryn, Mamas Bankkonto (Mama's Bank Account), Berlin: Ullstein/Kindler 1946
- Isherwood, Christopher, Praterveilchen (Prater Violet), Hamburg: Rowohlt Verlag 1953
- James, Henry, Patina (The Tone of Time), Norderstedt: Books on Demand 2009, ISBN 978-3-8391-0439-2
- O'Hara, Mary, Sturmwind – Flickas Sohn (Thunderhead), Wiesbaden: Rheinische Verlags-Anstalt 1953
- Porter, Katharine Anne, Das letzte Blatt (The Leaning Tower), Bad Wörishofen: Kindler und Schiermeyer Verlag 1953
- Porter, Katharine Anne, Unter heißem Himmel (Flowering Judas), Bad Wörishofen: Kindler und Schiermeyer Verlag 1951
- Robinson, Henry Morton, Der Kardinal (The Cardinal), Frankfurt am Main: Verlag der Frankfurter Hefte 1950
- Thackeray, William Makepeace, Jahrmarkt der Eitelkeit (Vanity Fair), Berlin: Wegweiser Verlag/Volksverband der Bücherfreunde 1949
- Uris, Leon, Die Berge standen auf (The Angry Hills), München: Kindler 1963
- Whitfield, Raoul, Grünes Eis (Green Ice), Leipzig: Ernst Oldenburg 1931

== Secondary literature (selection) ==
- Habel, Walter (ed.): Wer ist wer?, vol. 13, Berlin 1958, p 103.
- Schuder, Werner (ed.): Kürschners Deutscher Literatur-Kalender 1967, vol. 55, Berlin 1967, p 80.
- Pommer, Ursula: In 56 Tagen den "Kardinal" übersetzt, in: Börsenblatt für den Deutschen Buchhandel (1976), no. 102, p 1911–1913.
- Bochow-Blüthgen, Hansi: Vom heute und vom Jahre Null, in: Die Begegnung, vol. 13 (1977), p 9–14.
- Winter, Helmut: Die Not des Exils/Christopher Isherwood: "Praterveilchen", in: Neue Zürcher Zeitung, 21 Oktober 1998, p 47.
- Bedürftig, Friedemann: Ein Bestseller in Bestübersetzung. Lektüre für das Heilige Jahr: Vor fünfzig Jahren erschien Henry Morton Robinsons Roman "Der Kardinal", in: Süddeutsche Zeitung, SZ am Wochenende, no. 190, 19/20 August 2000, p III.
- Schneider, Wolfgang: Im Bett mit Holly Golightly. Schlabberei: Truman Capotes "Frühstück bei Tiffany", in: Frankfurter Allgemeine Zeitung, no. 18, 22 January 2005, p 34.
