= Prater =

Public park in Vienna, Austria

Coordinates: 48°12′58″N 16°23′44″E

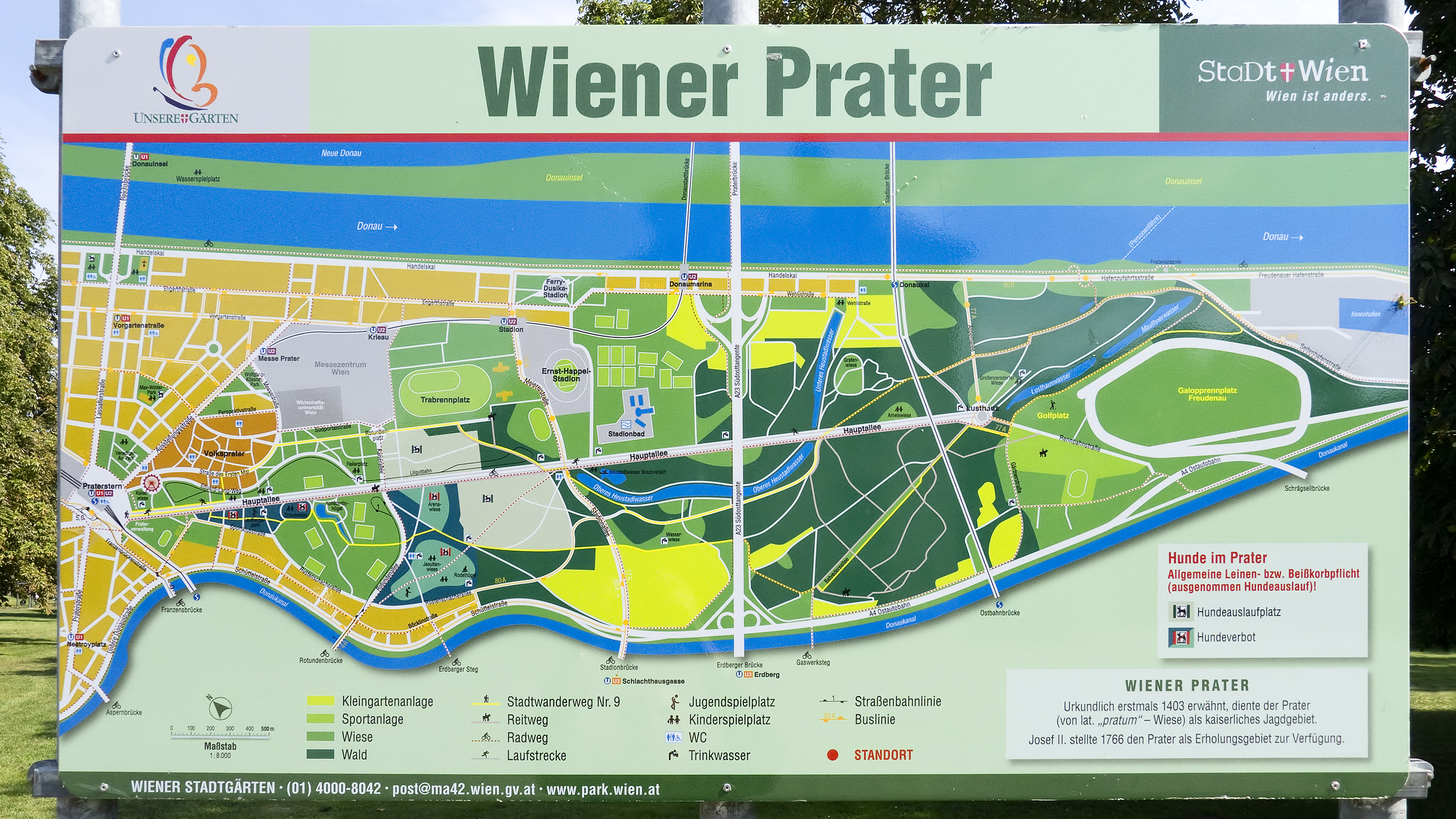
- Interactive map of Prater
- Location: Leopoldstadt, Vienna, Austria
- Area: 6,000,000 square metres (1,500 acres)
- Opened: 7 April 1766
- Website: Prater: www.praterwien.com/en/home Green Prater: www.wien.gv.at/umwelt/parks/anlagen/prater.html (in German)

The Prater is a 6 km² public park in Vienna's 2nd district, Leopoldstadt. The name "Prater" can also be used to refer to the Wurstelprater, an amusement park within the area.

== History ==
=== Royal hunting ground ===
The Prater was first documented in 1403 and served as an imperial hunting ground from the 16th century onwards. Emperor Maximilian II expanded the area, introducing enclosures and hunting lodges. Access to the Prater remained restricted, with entry granted only to select individuals, such as nobles and imperial officials. Throughout the following centuries, various rulers reinforced these restrictions, further limiting public access. In 1538, to establish a direct connection between the Palais Augarten and the hunting grounds in the Prater, the 4.4 km long, straight Hauptallee was created, cutting through the forest, making it a continuous route to the Lusthaus.

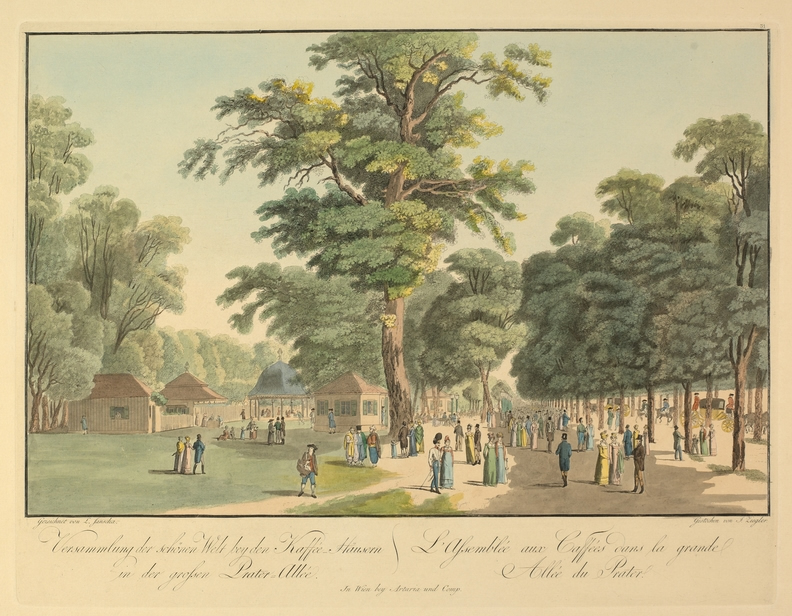
The Prater in 1793

=== Public access ===
In 1766, Emperor Joseph II opened the Prater to the general public, allowing people of all social classes to visit. Businesses, including coffee houses and inns, settled in the area, followed by early amusement attractions such as swings, carousels, and bowling alleys, laying the foundation for what became the Wurstelprater.

The late 18th century saw the rapid expansion of entertainment in the Prater. Vienna’s first fireworks display was held there in 1771, followed by the introduction of hot air balloon flights in 1784, including a flight by Jean-Pierre Blanchard. Infrastructure improvements, such as new roads and bridges, made the park more accessible, further increasing its popularity as a leisure destination.

By the early 19th century, the Prater had become central to Vienna’s social life. Major festivities took place there, including the annual Praterfahrt, a grand carriage procession. The event attracted thousands of spectators and influenced fashion trends, as prominent members of Viennese society showcased new styles during the celebration.

In 1848, the Prater was the site of significant conflict during the revolutionary year. The Praterschlacht (Battle of the Prater) on August 23, 1848, saw the Wiener Nationalgarde (Vienna National Guard) clash with demonstrating workers, reflecting the social tensions of the time. In October of the same year, military confrontations occurred between revolutionary forces and imperial soldiers near the Lusthaus and Praterstern.

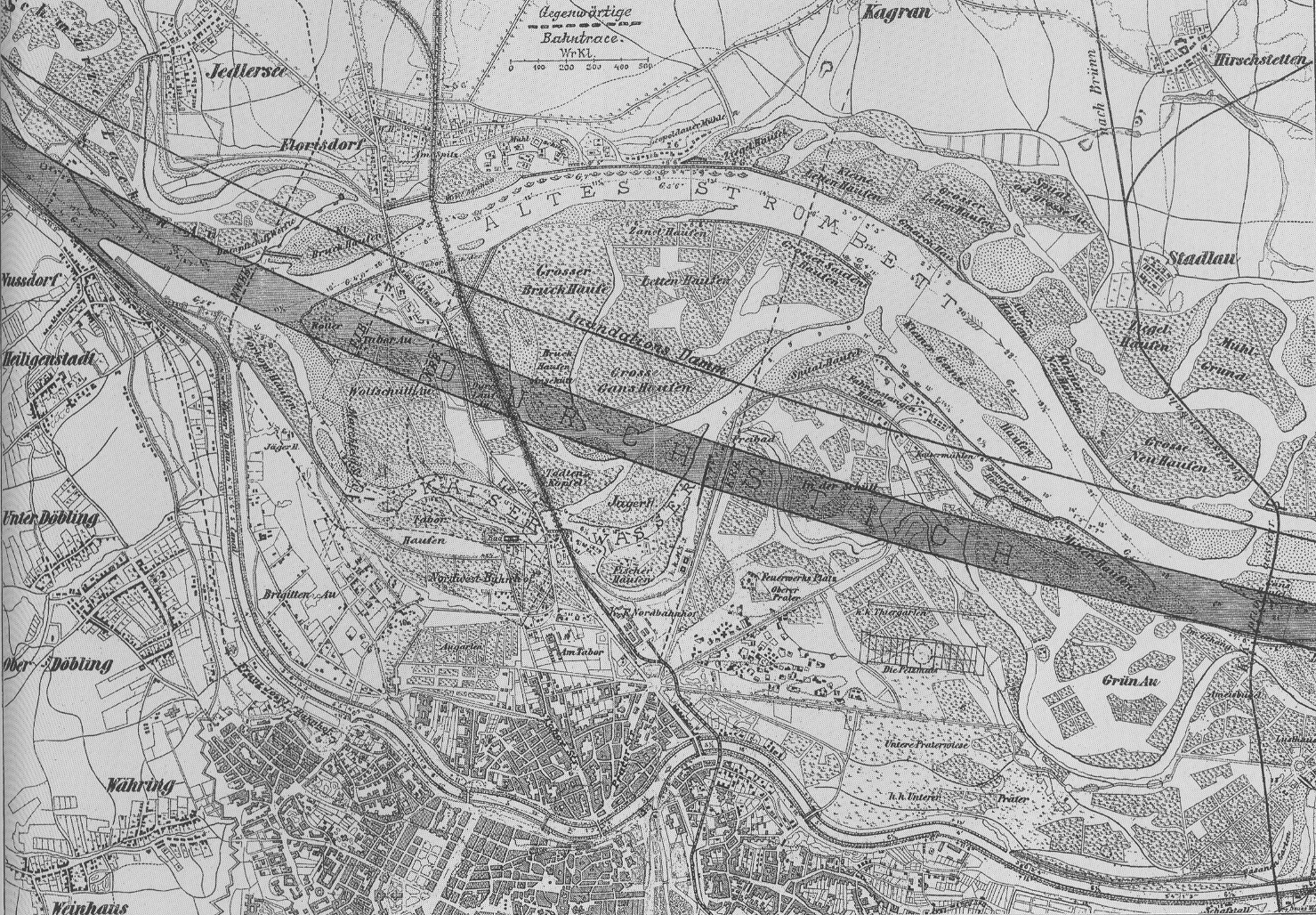
Plan for the Danube regulation

=== Danube regulation ===
Starting in 1868, concrete planning for the regulation of the Danube River began, following decades of discussions. Construction began in 1870, water was introduced into the new riverbed on April 14, 1875, and the official opening was held on May 30, 1875, by Emperor Franz Joseph I.

As a result of the regulation, especially due to the increased flow velocity and deepening of the river, the landscape of the floodplain was altered. The groundwater level dropped, and the original vegetation of the floodplain disappeared. Remnants of this original landscape can still be found in the southeastern part of the Prater. Several of the previous Danube branches were transformed into standing water due to the creation of the new riverbed.

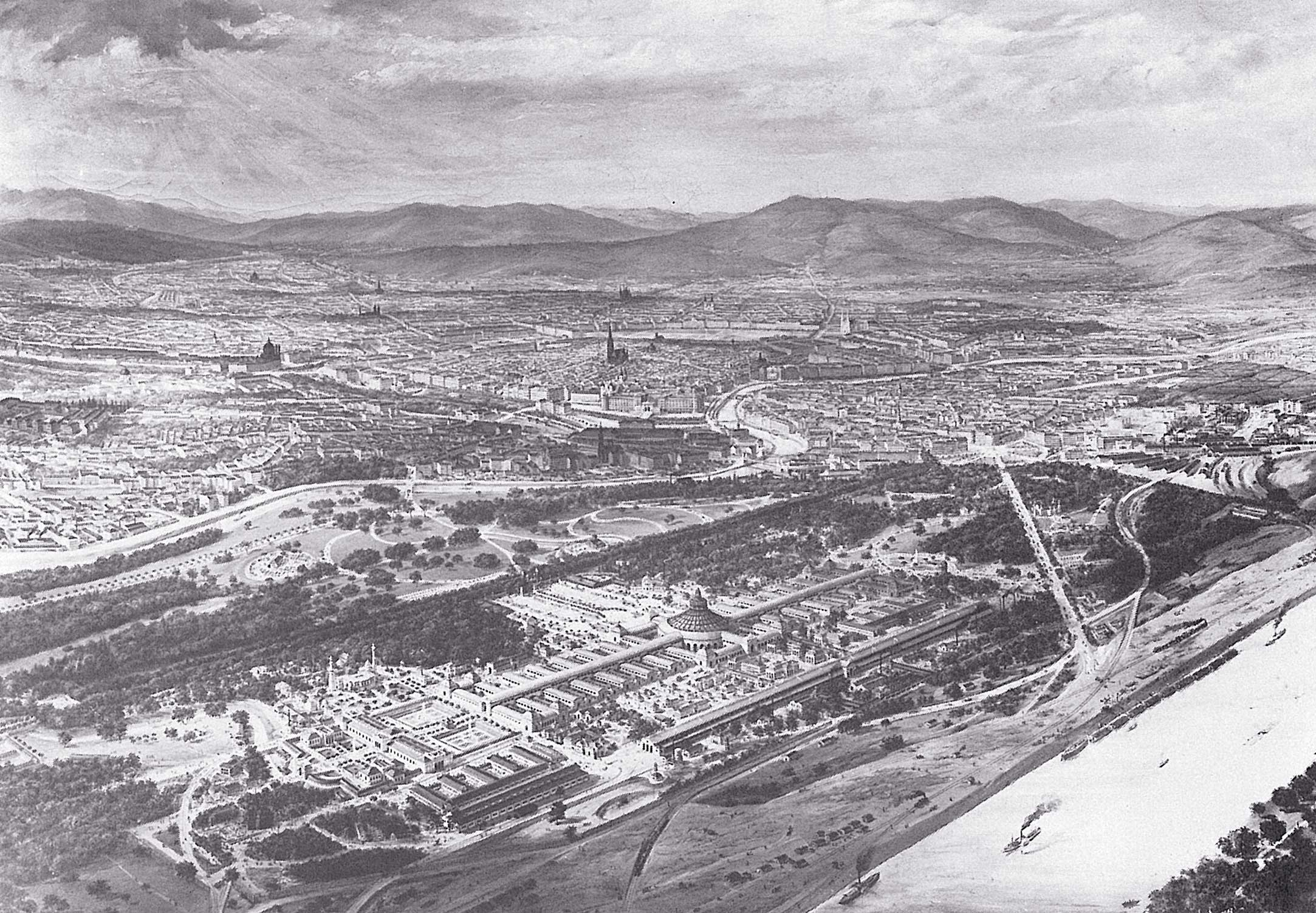
The World Expo

=== 1873 World Expo ===
The 1873 World Exposition took place in Vienna from May 1 to November 2, attracting 7.25 million visitors but resulting in a deficit of 14.9 million gulden. The exhibition grounds were developed with roads and spacious parking areas, and street names such as Ausstellungsstraße, Perspektivstraße, Rotundenallee, Zufahrtsstraße, Südportalstraße, and Nordportalstraße still reflect this development. Around two million square meters of forest were cleared to make space for the exhibition buildings, and several rivers and floodplains were filled in.

A large area was designated for exhibition halls in the Prater, with the Rotunde at its center. At that time, it was the largest dome in the world, measuring 108 meters in diameter. Most of the exhibition buildings were dismantled over time, but the Rotunde remained in operation for more than 60 years before being destroyed by a large fire on September 17, 1937. In 1874, the Viennese Harness Racing Club was founded, and the races, which were initially held on the Hauptallee, were relocated to the permanent Trabrennbahn Krieau on September 29, 1878.

The Prater also became a popular gathering place for the labour movement. The first May Day march in Austria took place on May 1, 1890, in the Hauptallee and gained significant attention across Europe.

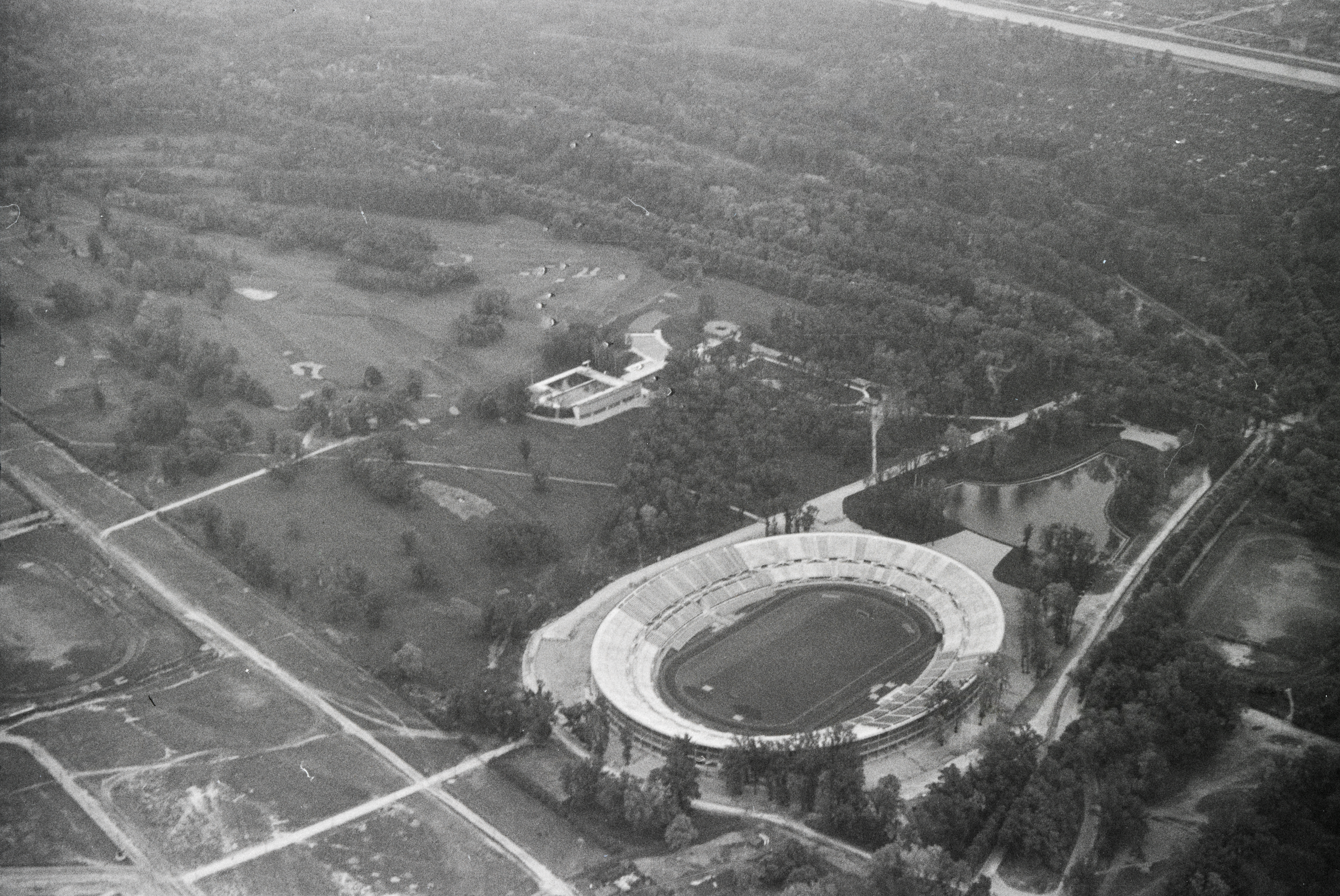
The Praterstadion in 1932

=== 20th century ===
In 1928, the Stadionbad (a public swimming-pool complex) was constructed by the city during Red Vienna. In November 1928, the city administration laid the foundation stone for the Praterstadion (later renamed Ernst-Happel-Stadion), which was officially opened on July 11, 1931, during the 2nd Workers' Olympiad, a major event for the Social Democratic movement. At the time, this stadium was considered the most modern in Europe, particularly due to its short drainage time of only seven to eight minutes. Initially, it had a capacity of around 60,000 people. On January 8, 1930, the Planetarium opened at Praterstern, directly in front of the entrance to the Wurstelprater.

During the Battle of Vienna in 1945, intense fighting took place in the Prater between the Wehrmacht and the Soviet Red Army. The battles caused significant damage: the part of the Wurstelprater north of Ausstellungsstraße, including the Venediger Au, was completely destroyed; the area was later transformed into a park. The Wurstelprater and the Planetarium were destroyed but later rebuilt. The Riesenrad, the racing tracks, the Lusthaus, the Liliputbahn, the Stadionbad, and the stadium were all damaged but repaired. Only a shooting gallery, a carousel, and a restaurant in the Wurstelprater remained undamaged.

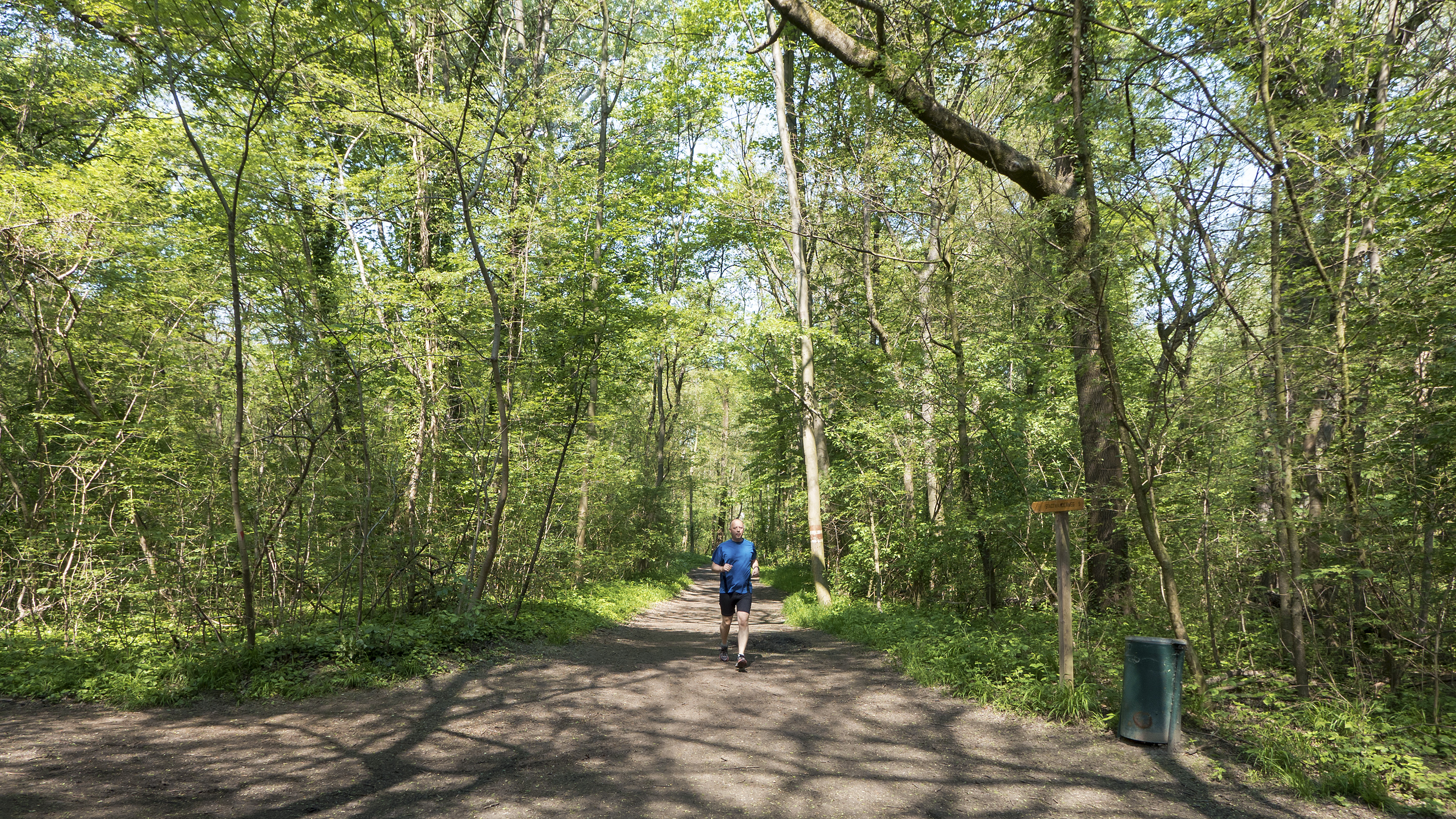
The southern Prater

Restoration of the Prater (which formed part of the Soviet-occupied sector of Vienna until 1955) was completed by 1953. In 1970, one of the first sections of the Südosttangente (southeast expressway), Austria's busiest highway, was constructed through the middle of the Prater. In the 1970s, private-car traffic was largely restricted in the Hauptallee.

== Park ==
The Prater is a popular recreational and leisure area in Vienna, offering a wide variety of sports facilities. These include areas for football, baseball, field hockey, tennis, golf, disc golf at the Prater Parcours, running, equestrian sports, swimming, bowling, and skateboarding. In winter, activities such as cross-country skiing, tobogganing, and ice skating are also available. The Prater contains over 127,000 square meters of playgrounds and sports fields.

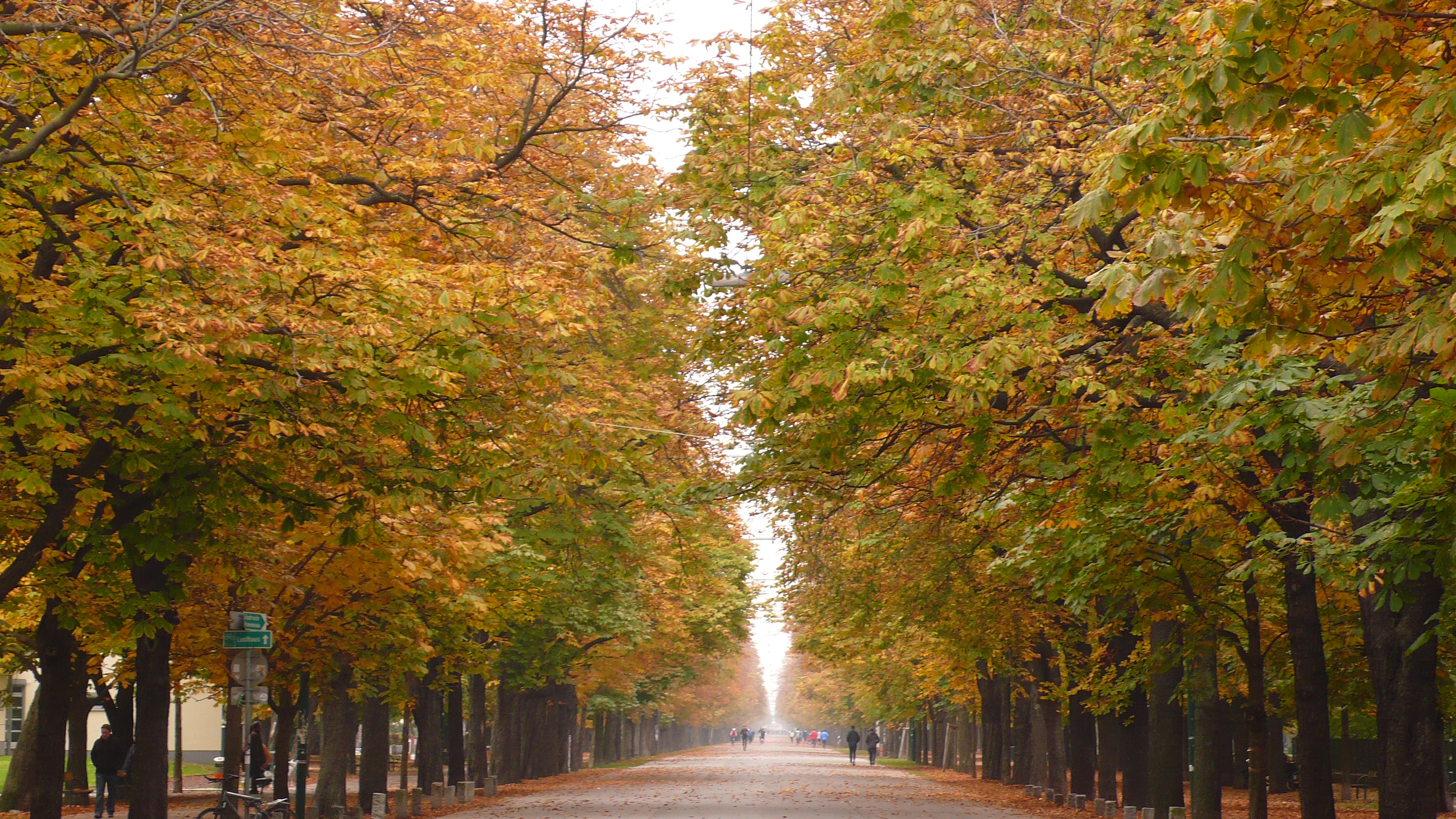
The Hauptallee in autumn

=== Hauptallee ===
The Hauptallee is a roughly 4.4 km long avenue in the Prater. It runs from the Praterstern to the Lusthaus and was created in 1538 by clearing parts of the forest to establish a connection between the Augarten and the imperial hunting grounds. The straight avenue consists of the main roadway with pedestrian promenades on either side. Between them, rows of chestnut trees were planted.

Since June 1964, private car traffic has been largely prohibited on the Hauptallee. Today, it is a public recreational area for cyclists, pedestrians, and runners (e.g., during the annual Vienna City Marathon).

On October 12, 2019, Kenyan runner Eliud Kipchoge became the first person to complete a marathon distance in under two hours (1:59:40) during the Ineos 1:59 Challenge. The route primarily involved multiple laps of the Hauptallee.

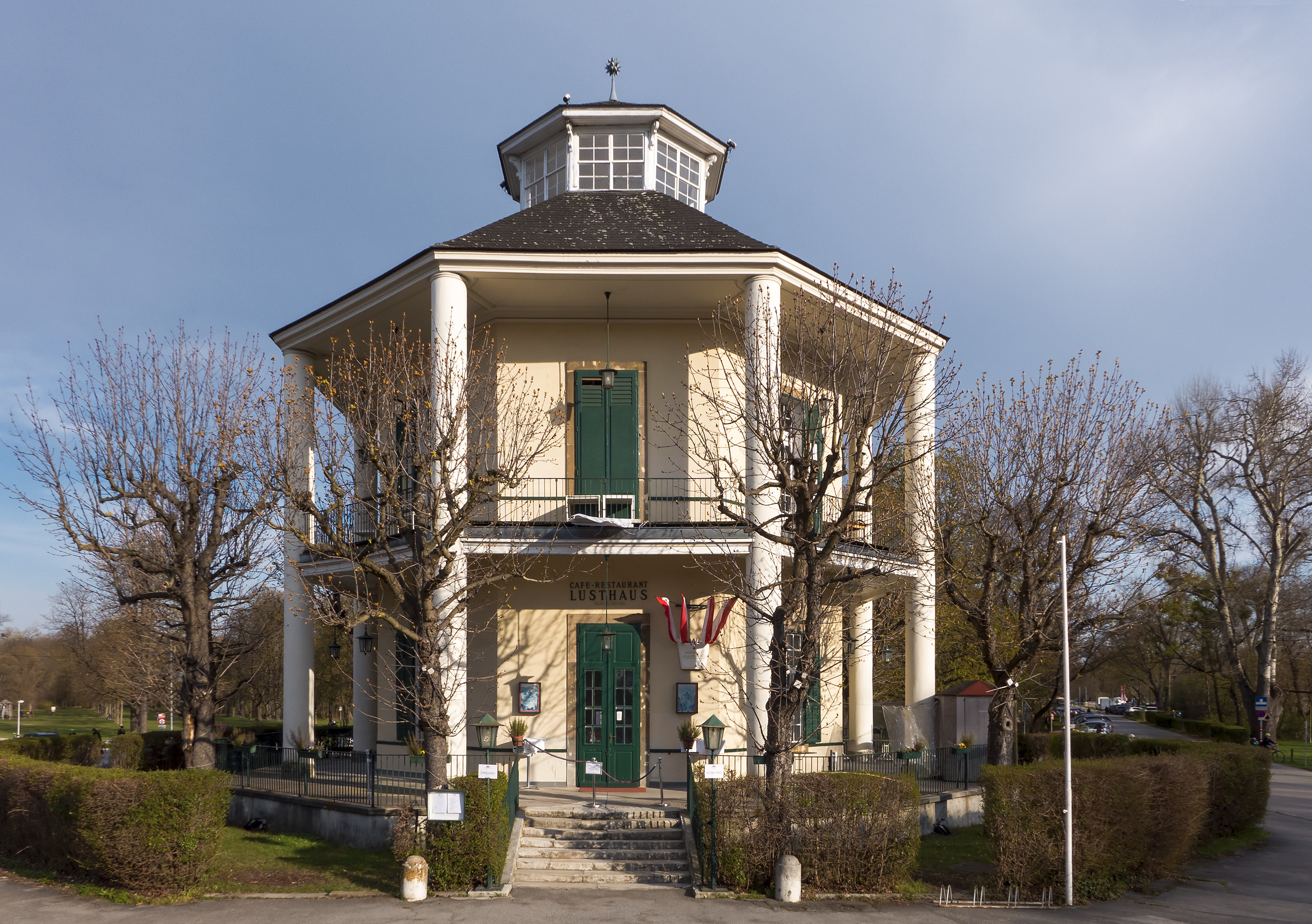
The Lusthaus

=== Lusthaus ===
The Lusthaus is a historic building located in Prater. Originally built in 1538, it served as a hunting lodge. The Lusthaus was situated at the junction of the Hauptallee and the Donaukanal, remaining by the water until 1834, when the canal was redirected. The building became a popular gathering spot for the nobility and bourgeoisie, offering a bar with dance and music. During the Second World War, the Lusthaus was almost completely destroyed by bombings in 1944 and 1945. Today, it houses a coffeehouse and a restaurant.

=== Meadows ===
The Prater is characterized by large meadows and commons, many of which are mowed only once or twice a year to protect the habitat of rare animals and plants. The meadows include (north to south):

Map with coordinates of the meadows: OSM

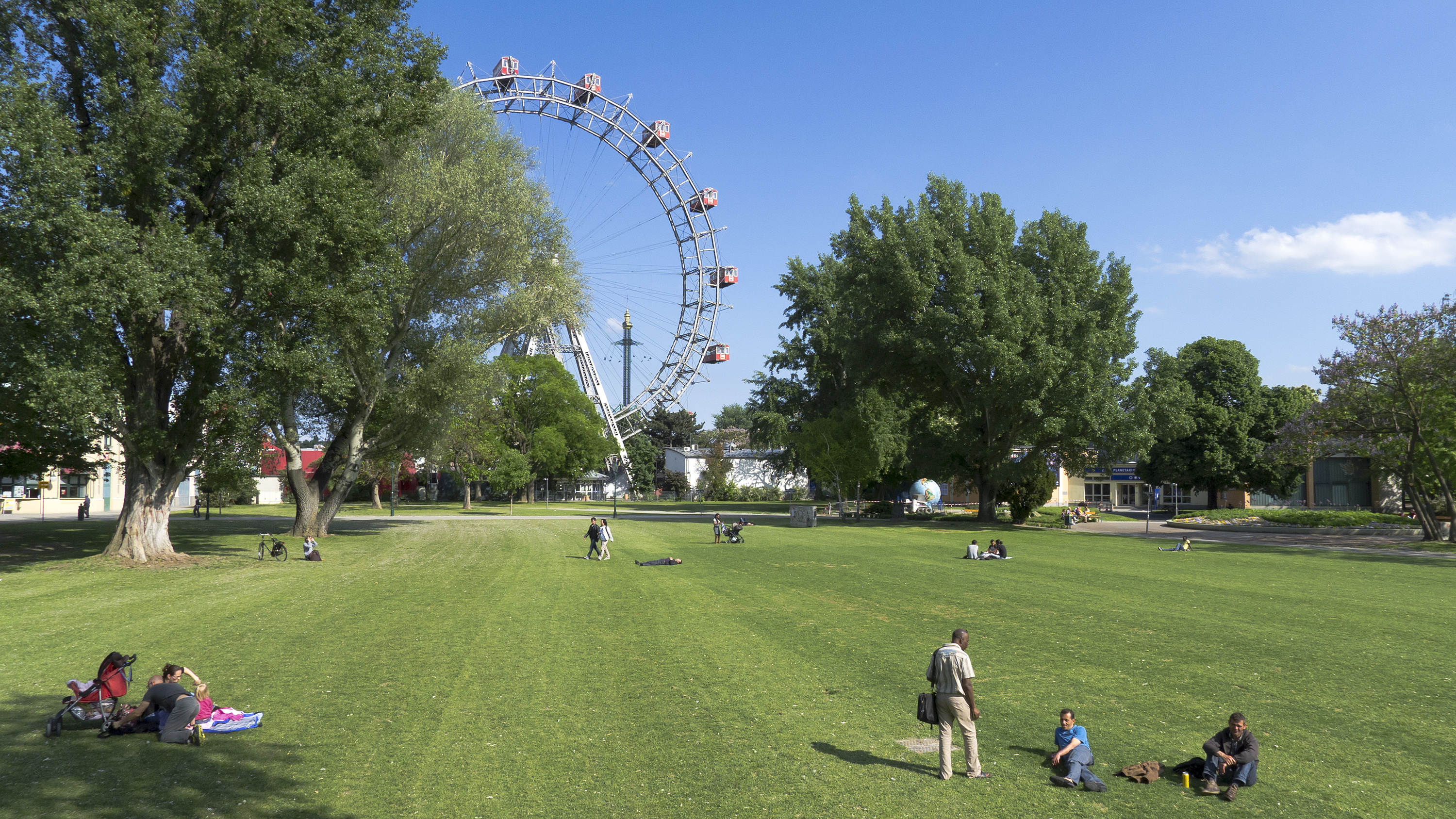
Kaiserwiese

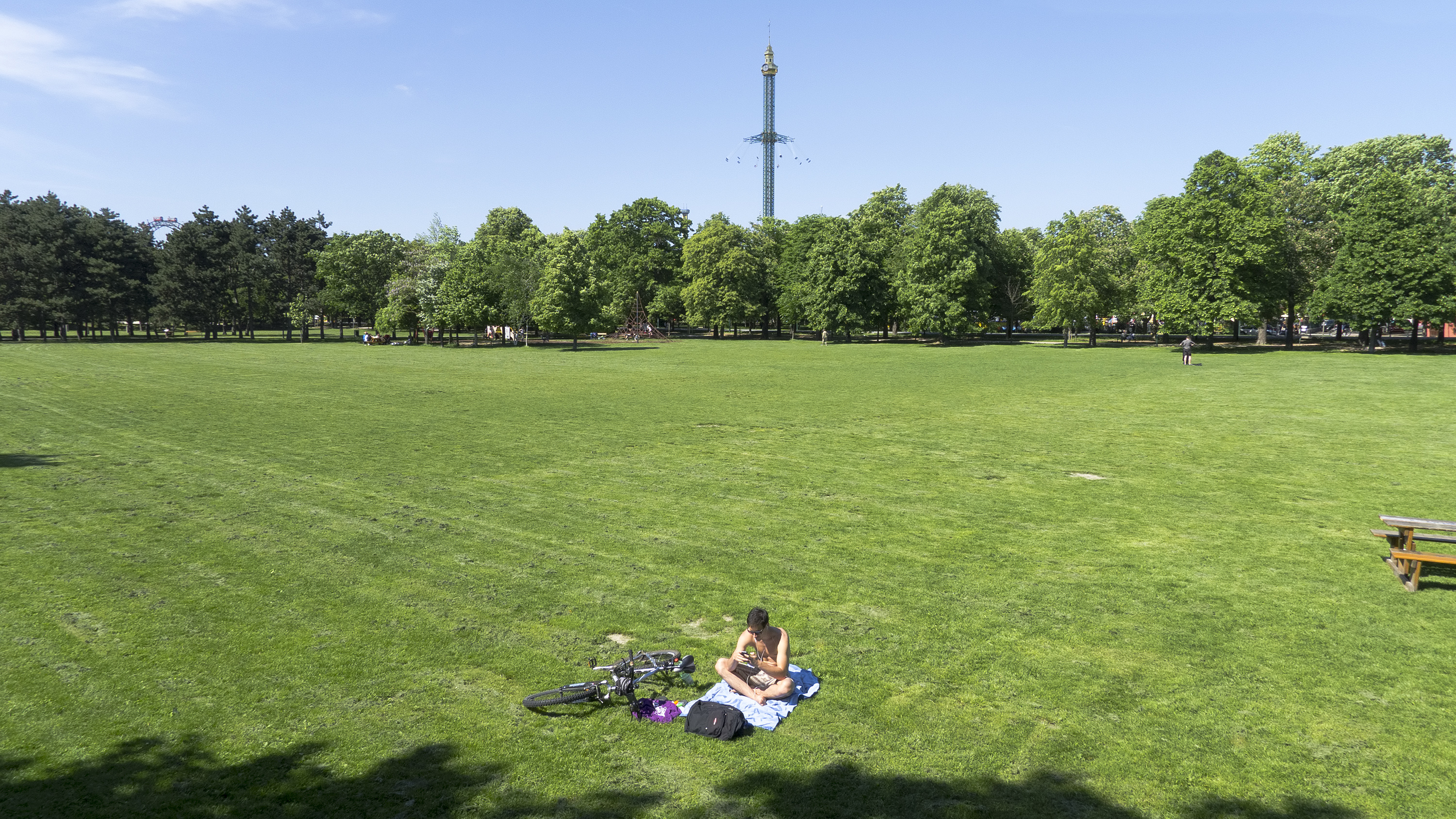
Zirkuswiese

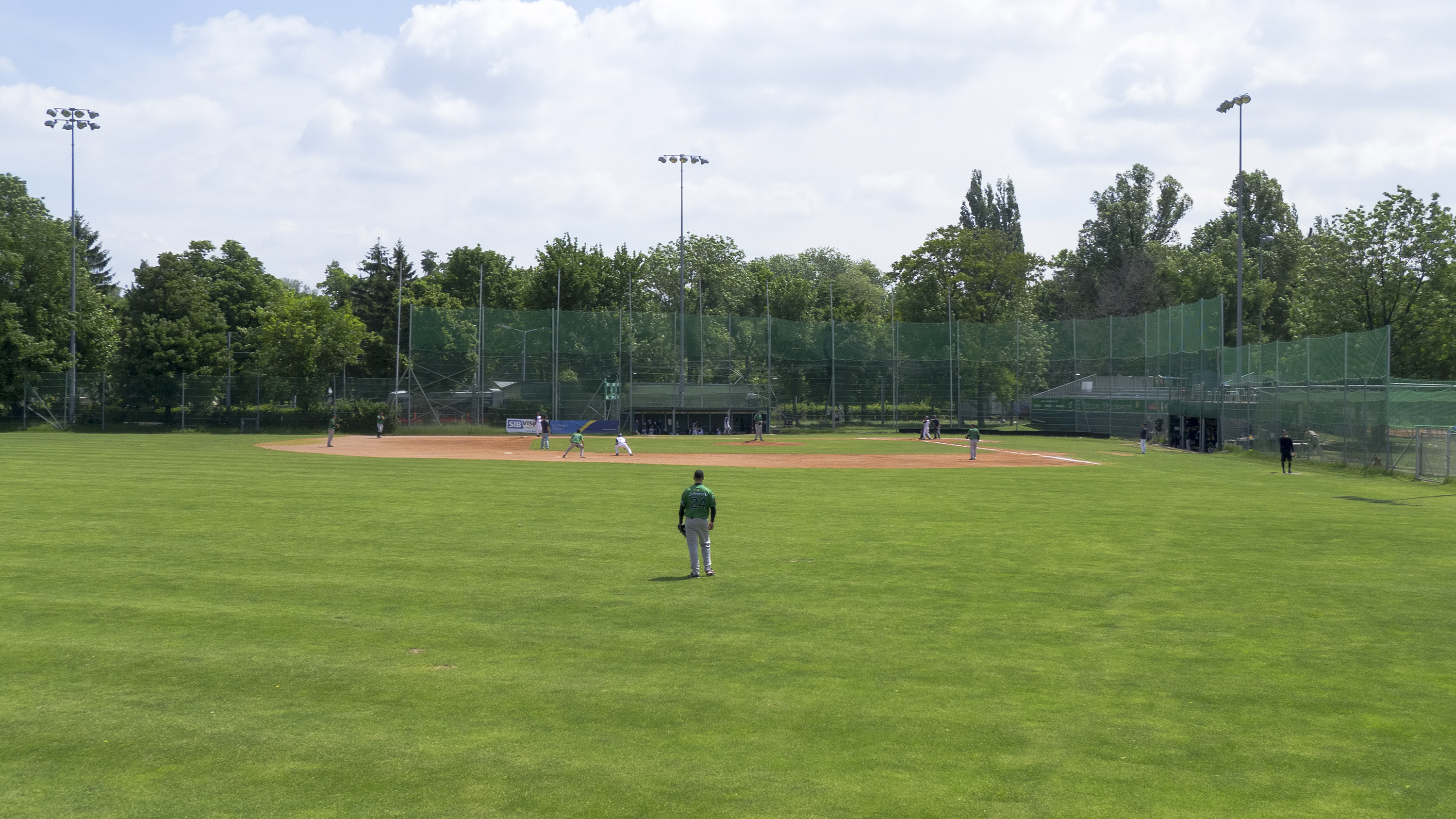
Spenadlwiese

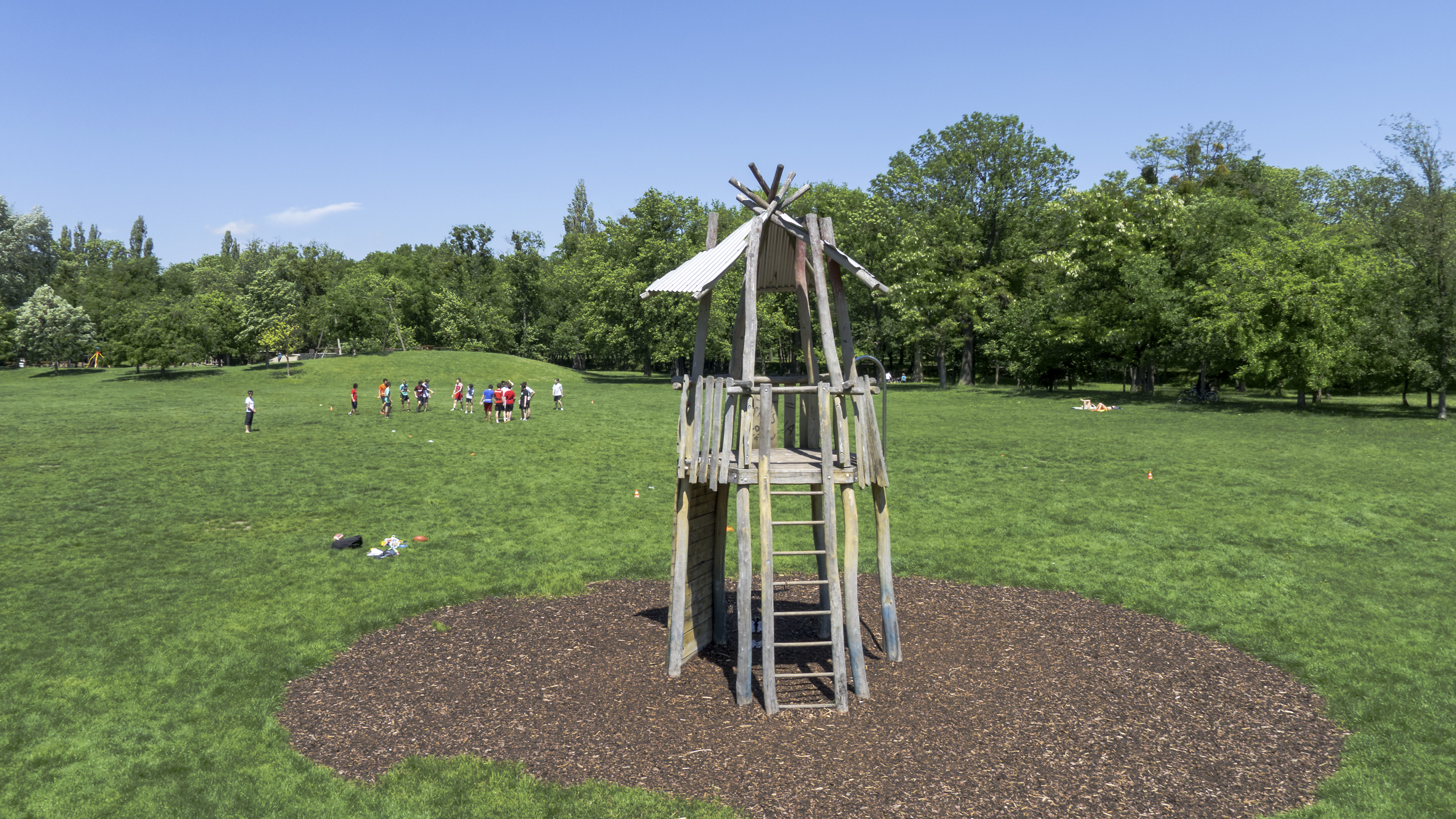
Jesuitenwiese

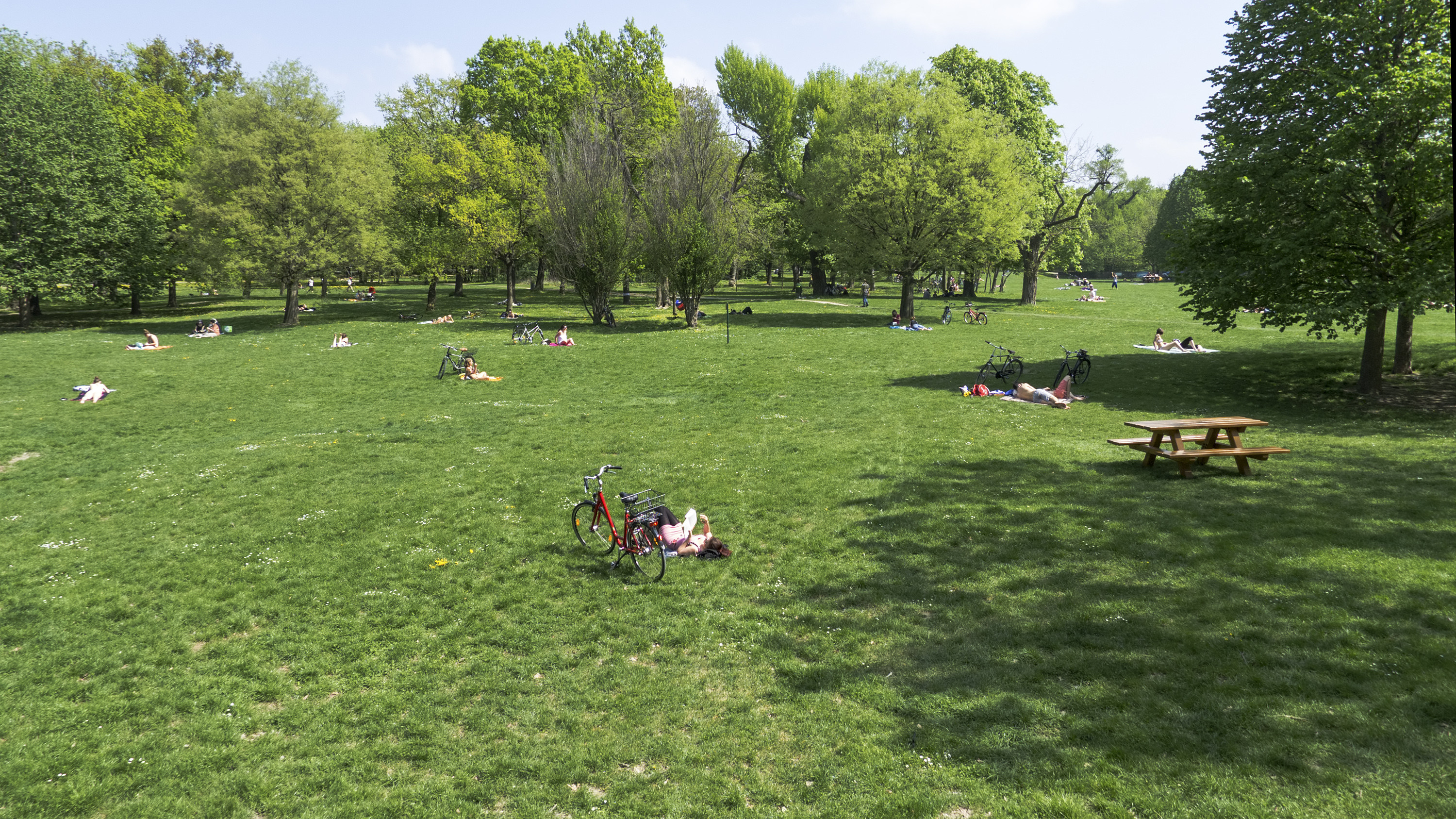
Arenawiese

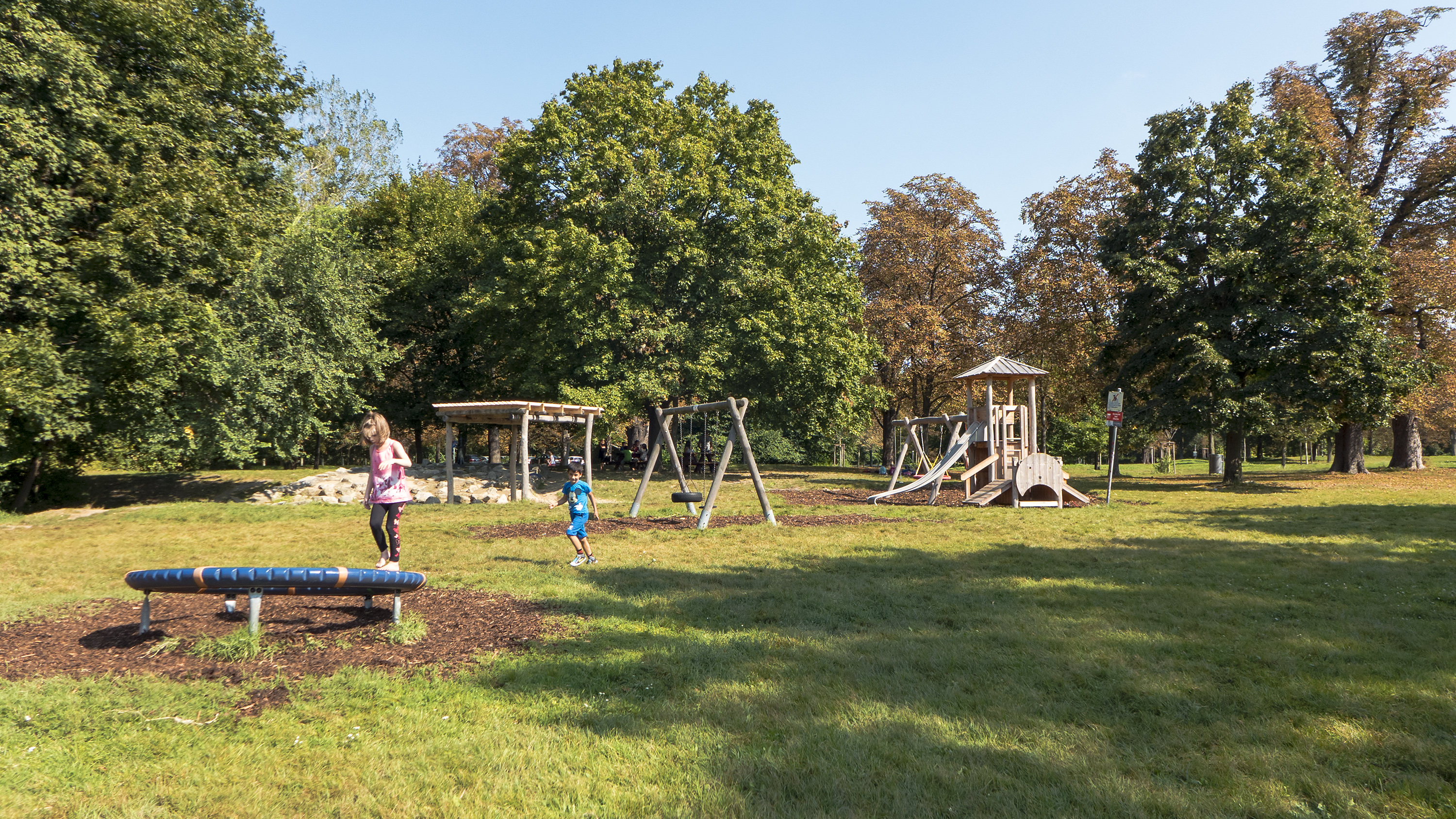
Wasserwiese

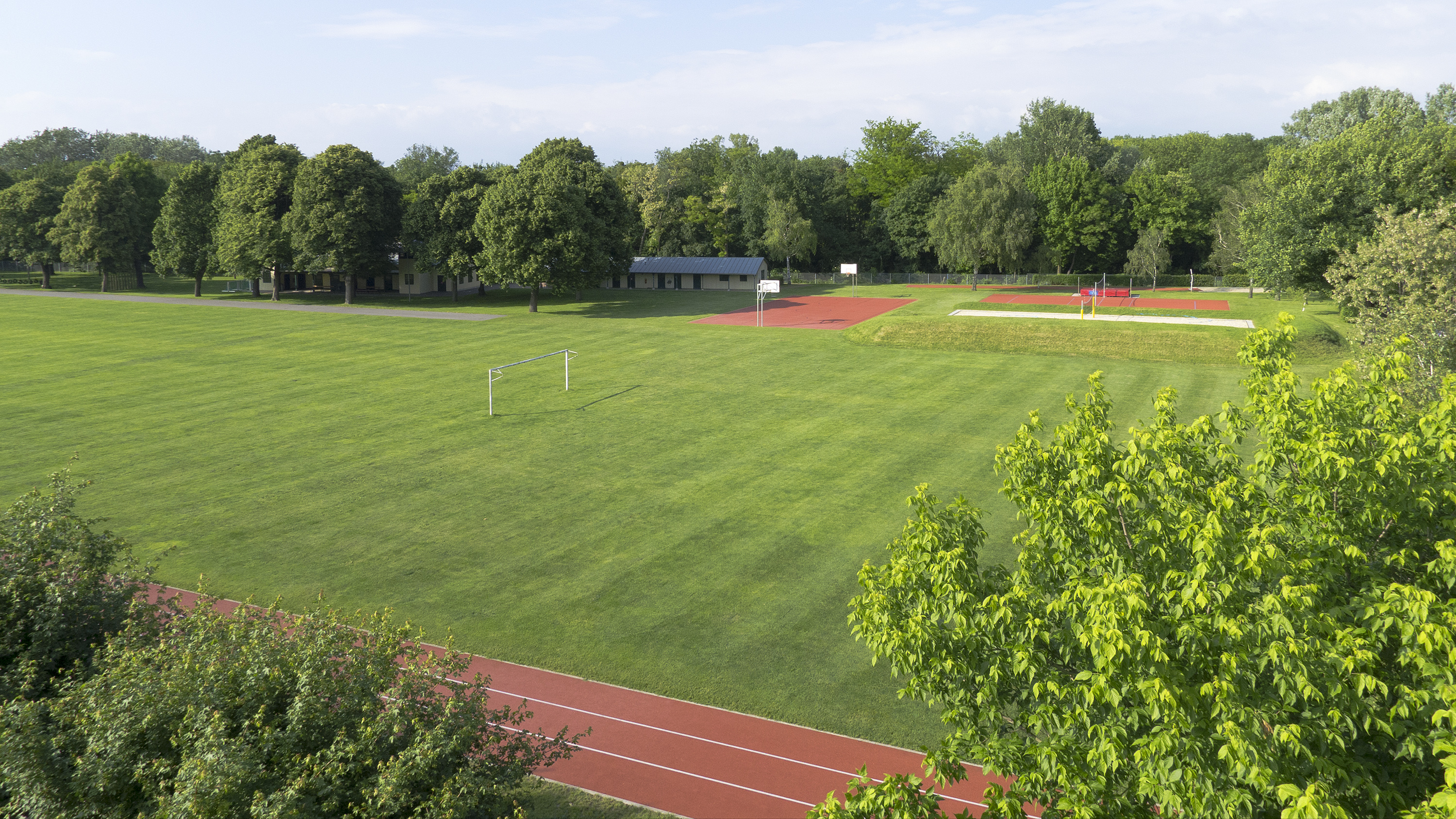
Birkenwiese

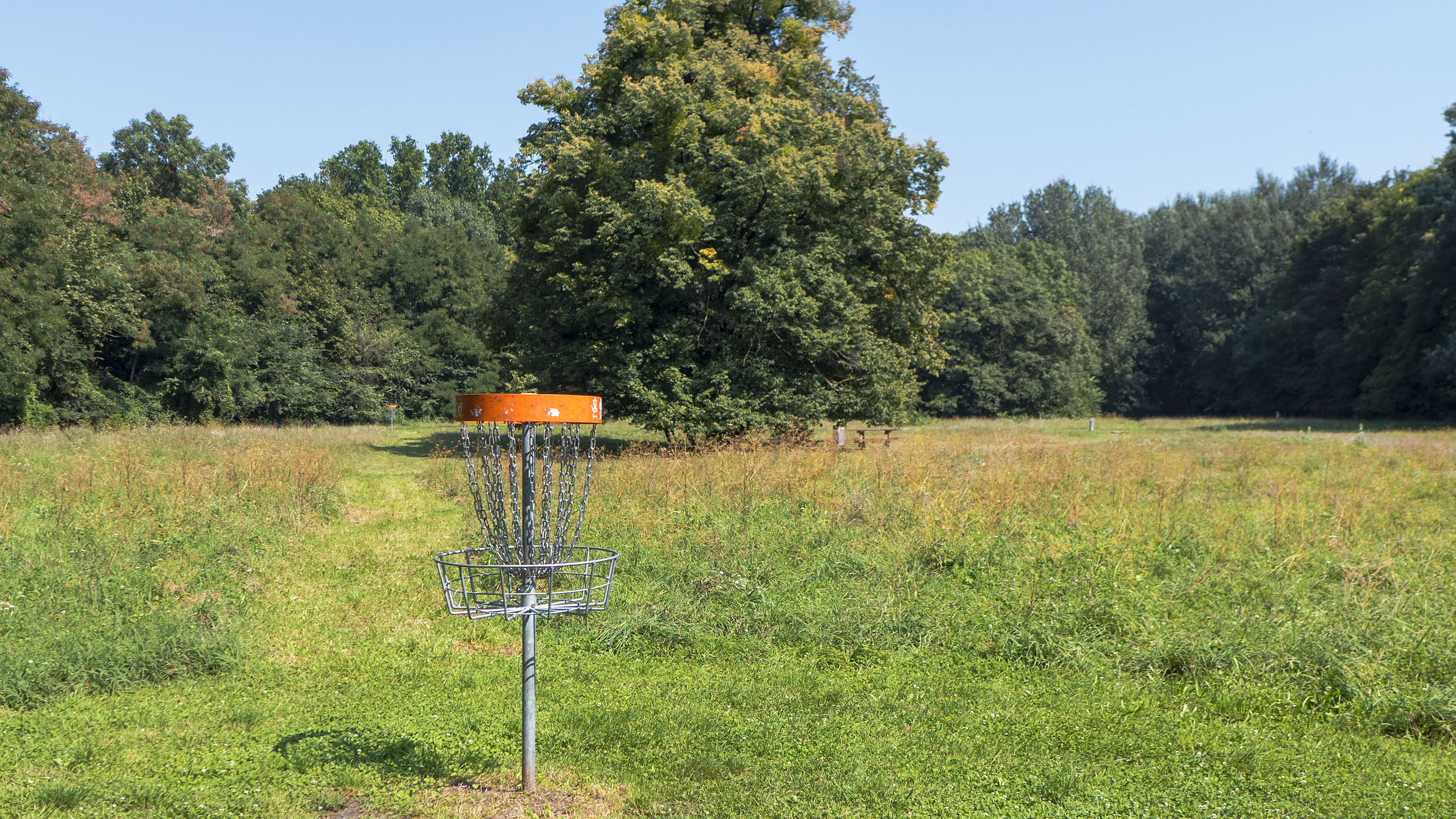
Golfwiese, with a public disc golf course

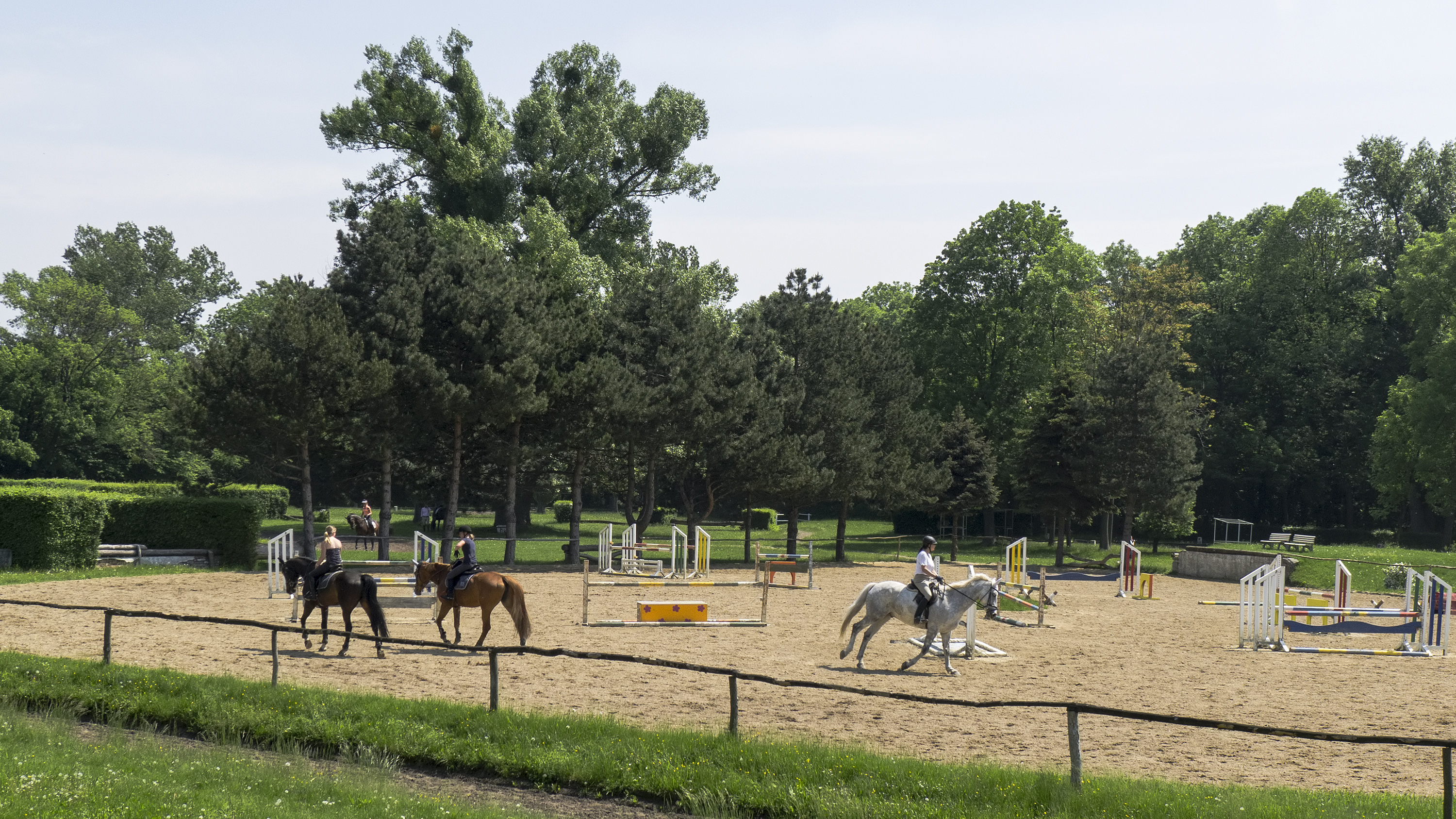
Ameiswiese

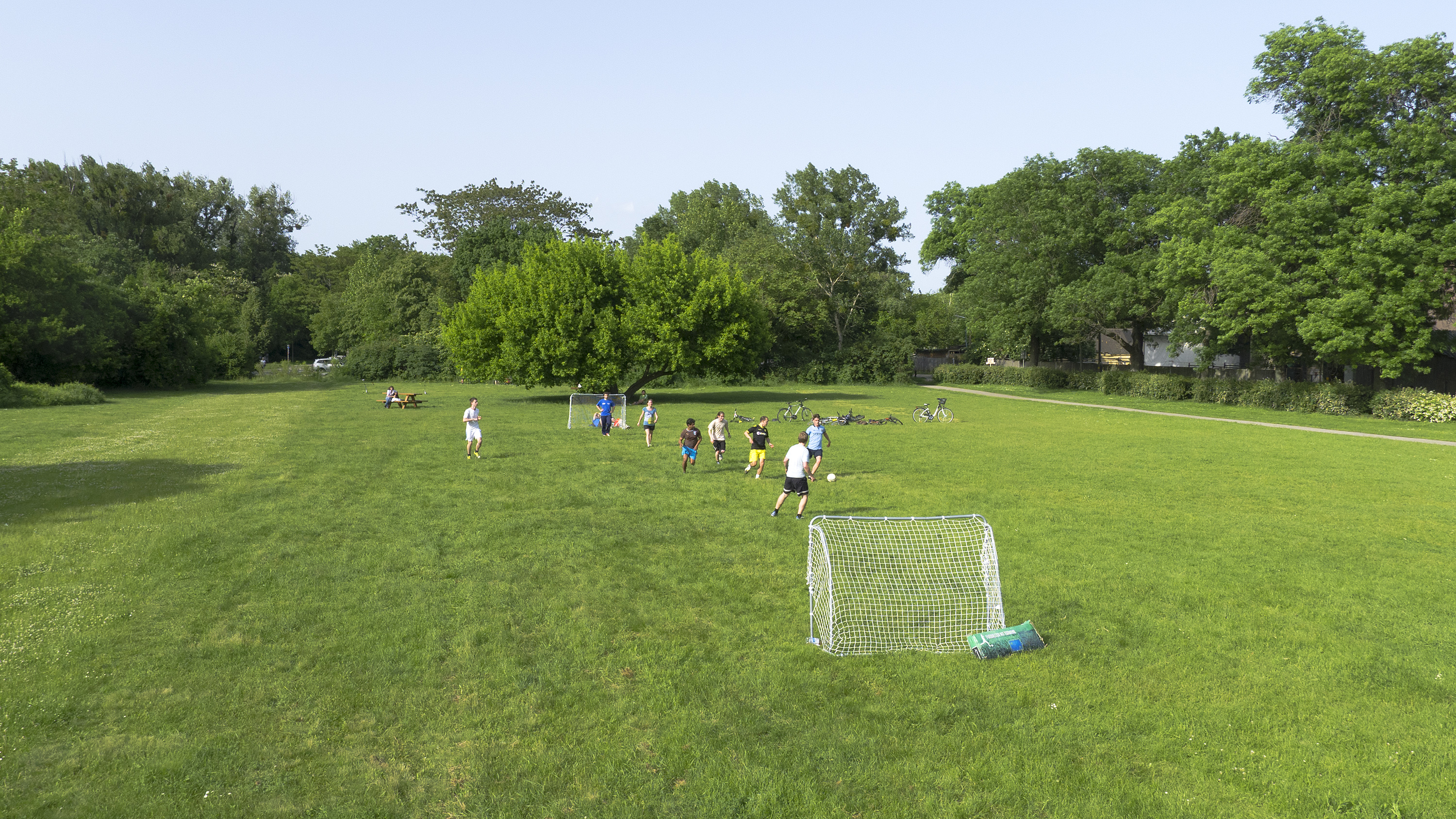
Feuerwehrwiese

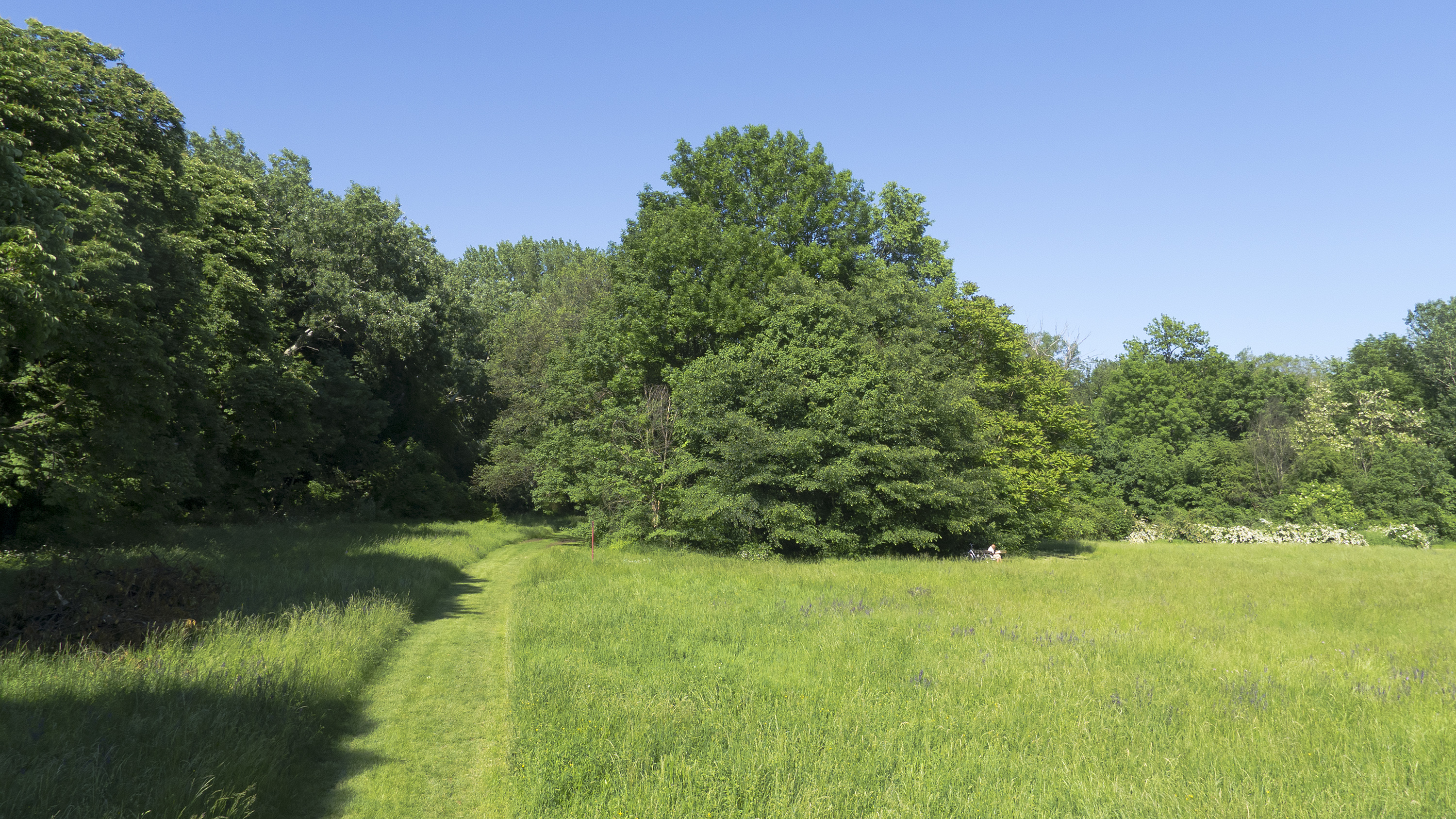
Grafenwiese

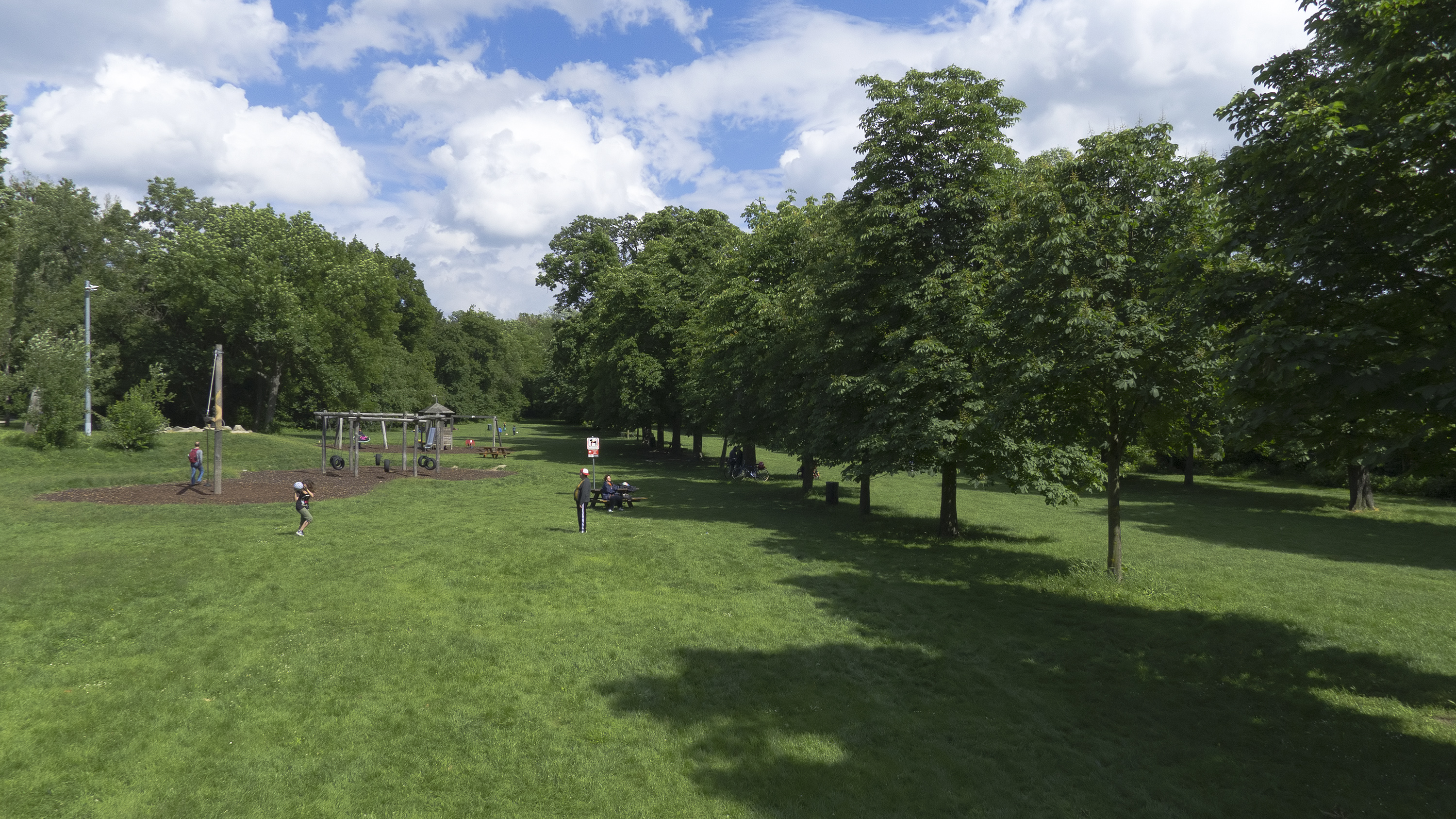
Lusthauswiese

=== Water ===
The waters of the Prater are remnants of former branches of the Danube . These were cut off from the main river during the Danube regulation in the 19th century. As a result, the flowing waters evolved into stagnant bodies of water.

The lakes include the Heustadelwasser, a narrow waterway, only 10 meters wide, which stretches over a kilometer from the Danube to Lusthausstraße.

Map with coordinates of the lakes: OSM

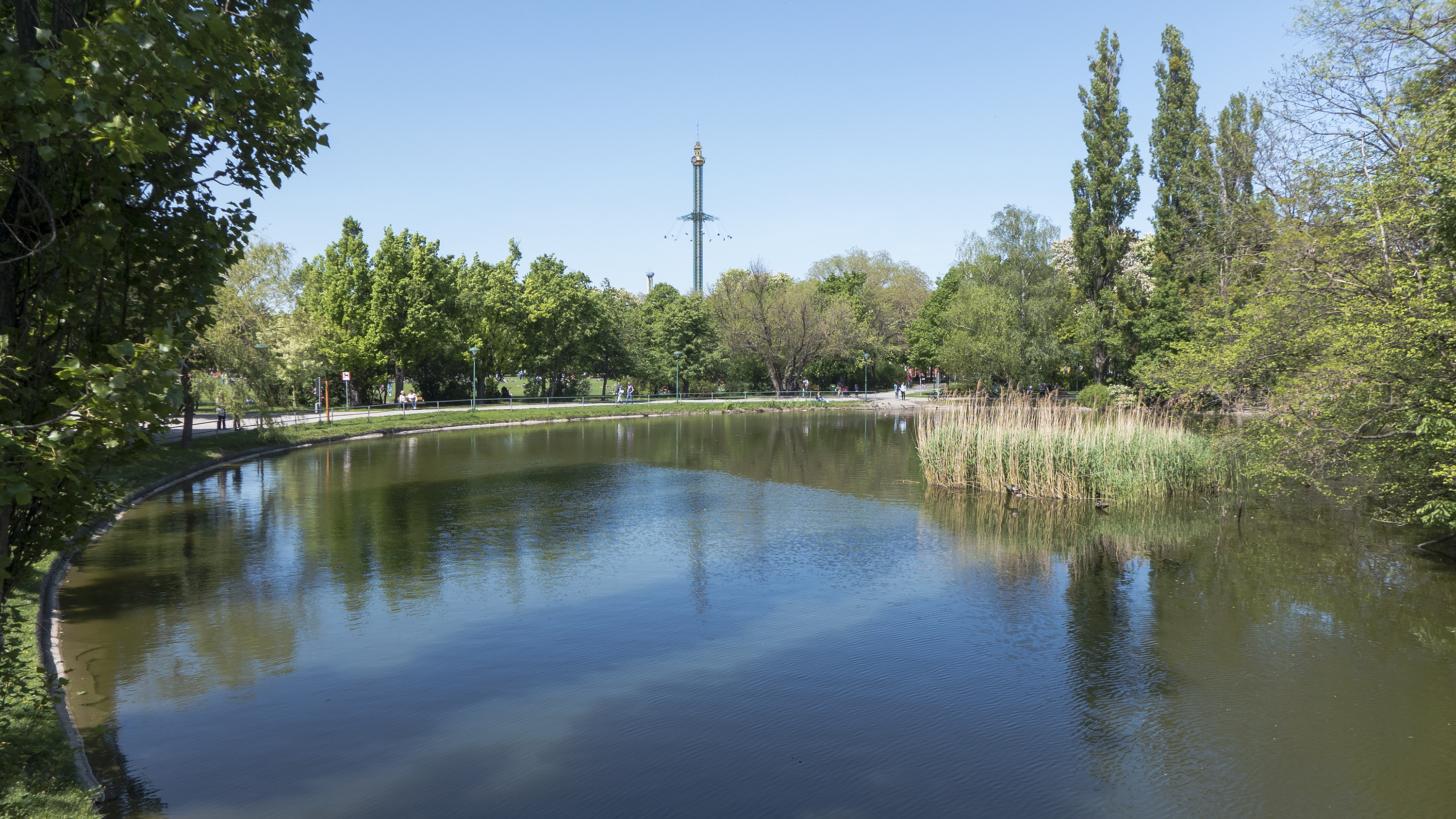
Konstantinteich

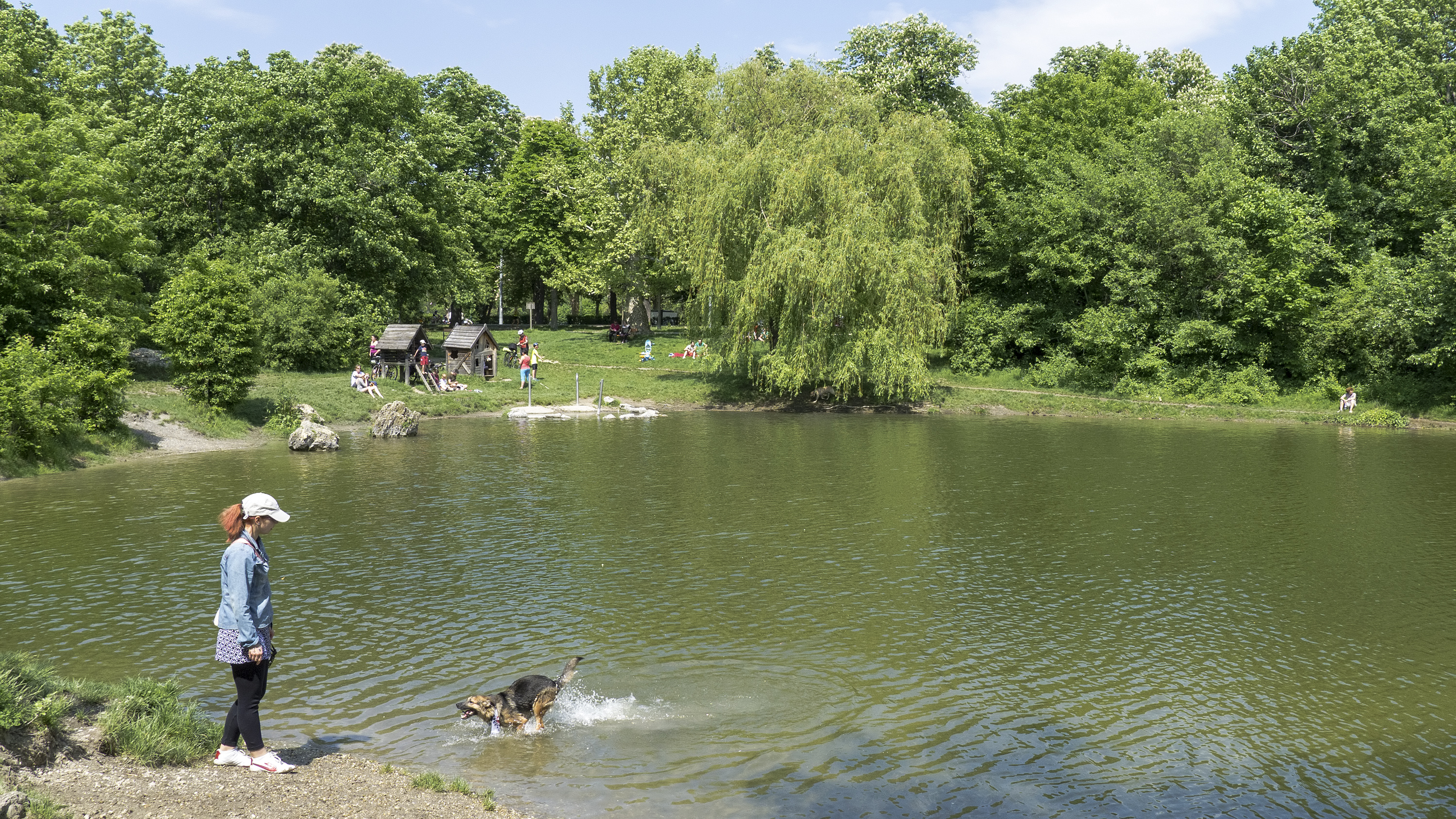
Rosenlacke

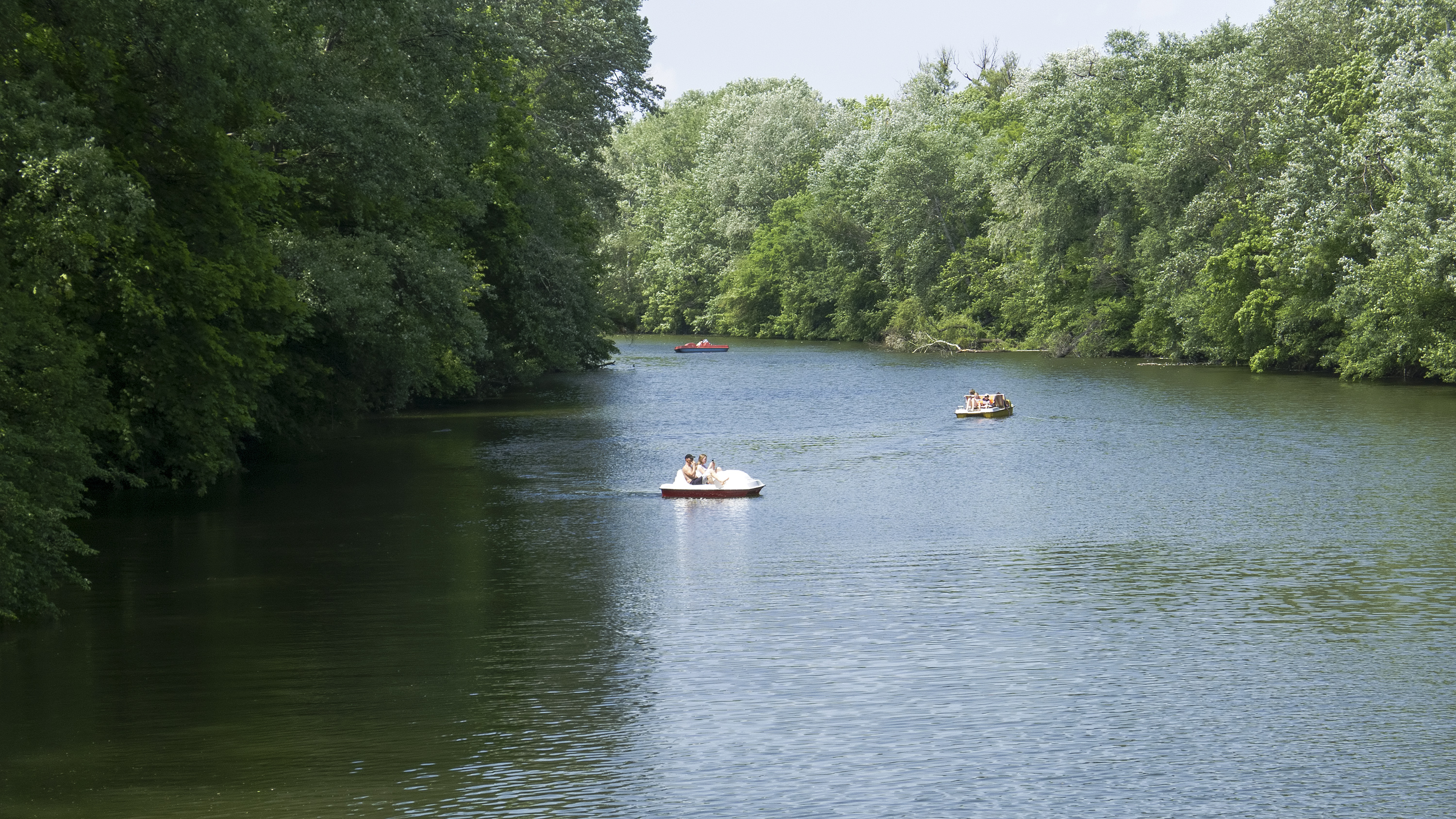
Upper Heustadelwasser

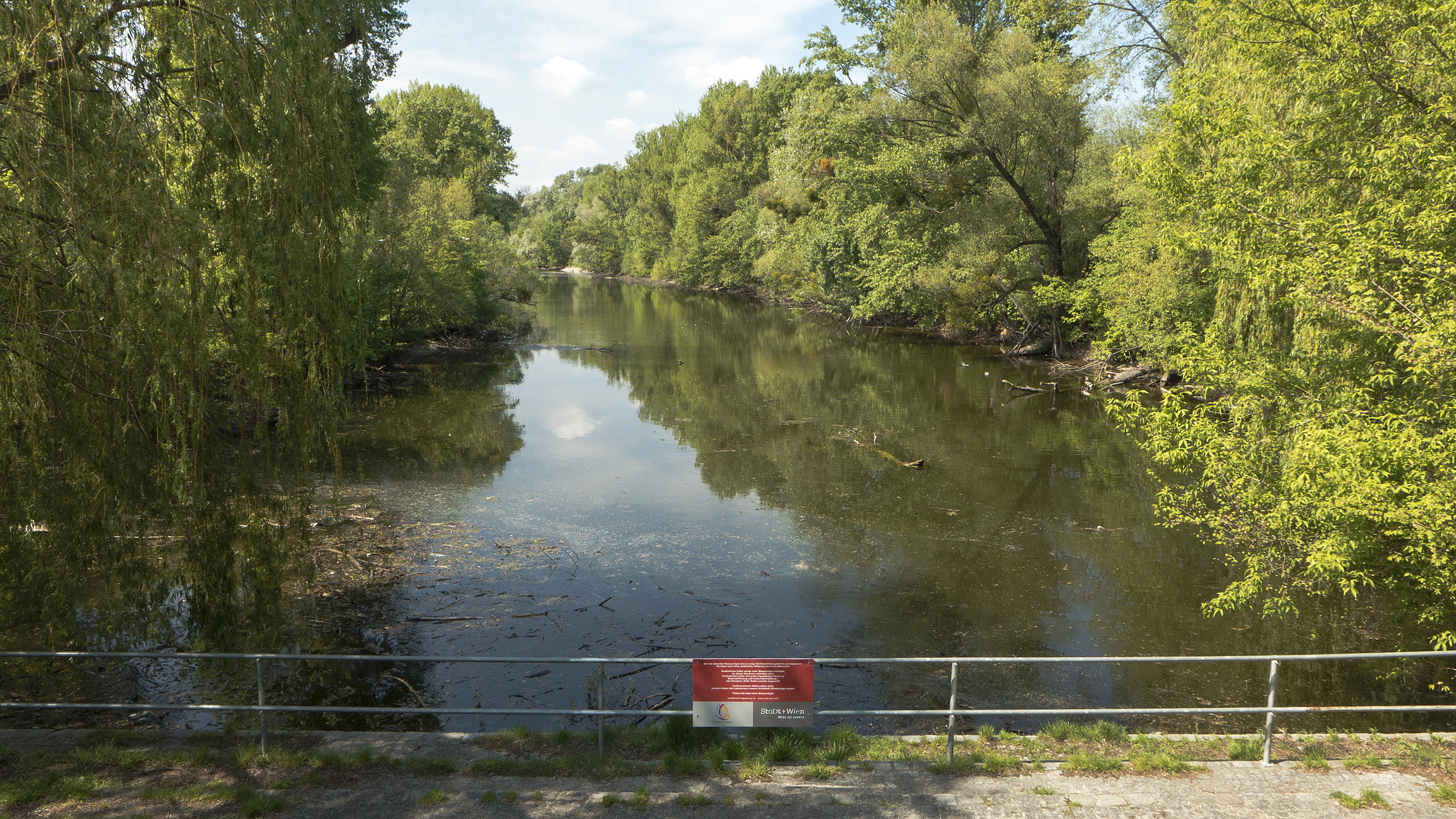
Lower Heustadelwasser

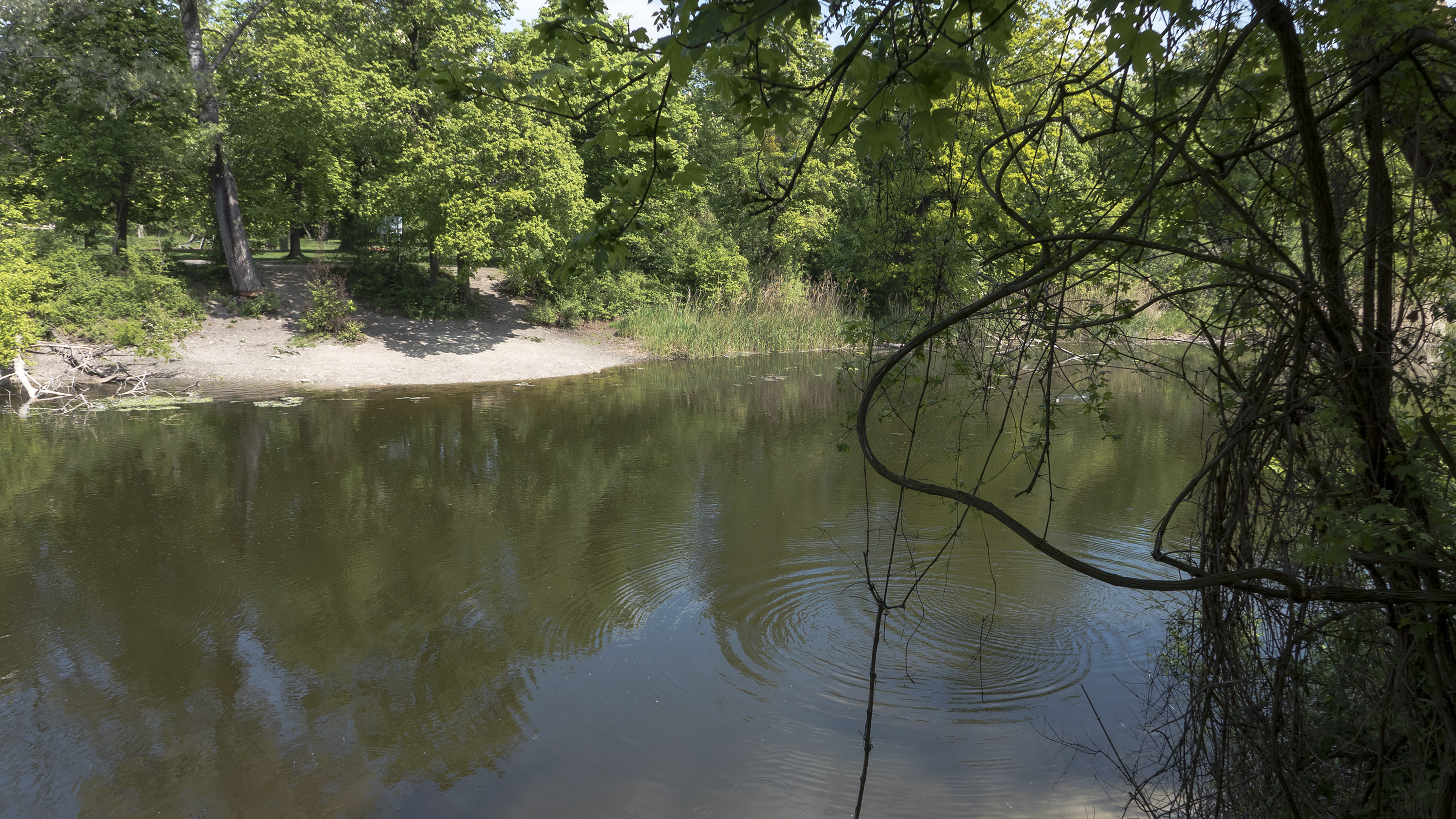
Lusthauswasser

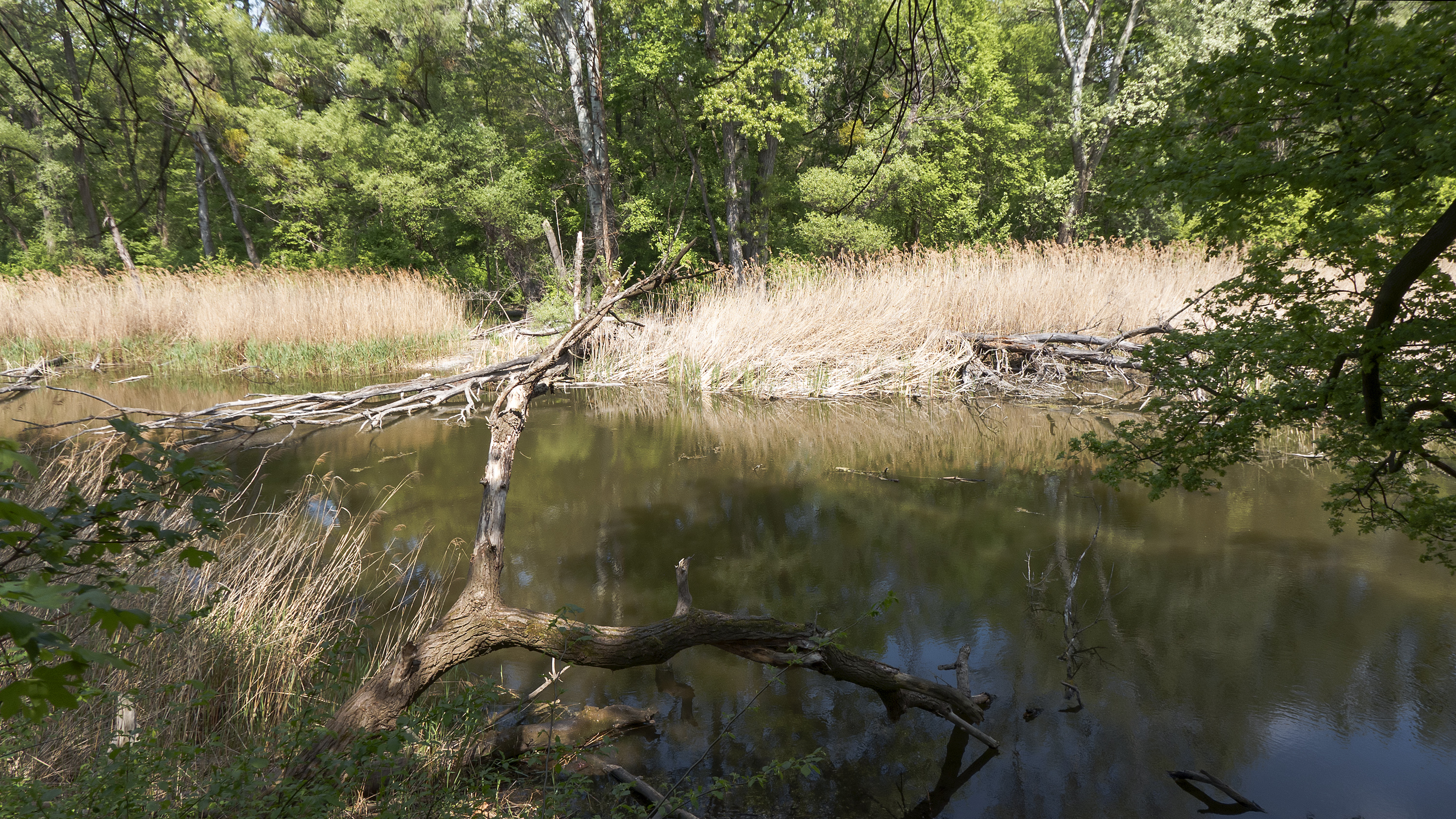
Mauthnerwasser

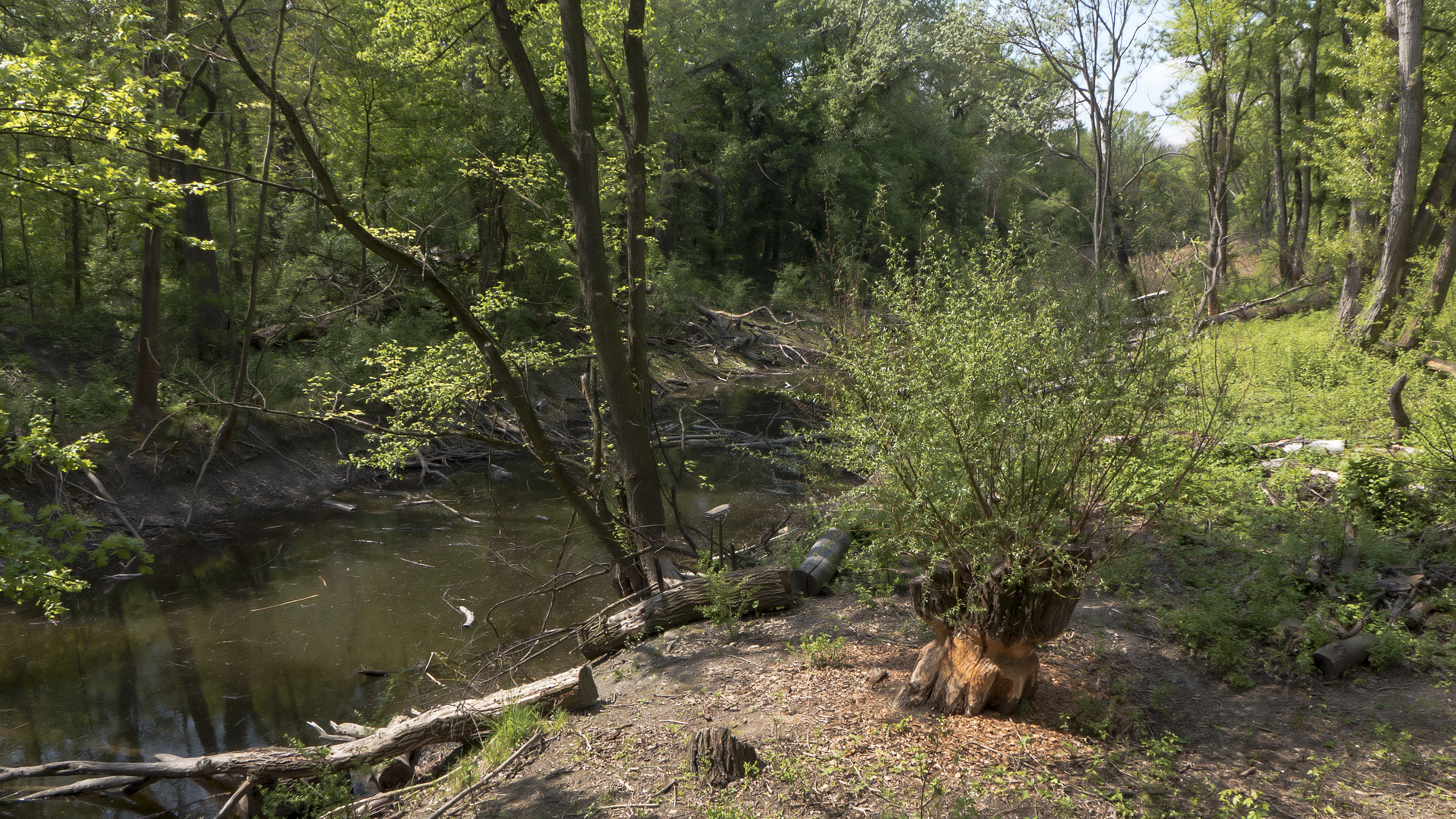
Krebsenwasser

=== Flora and Fauna ===
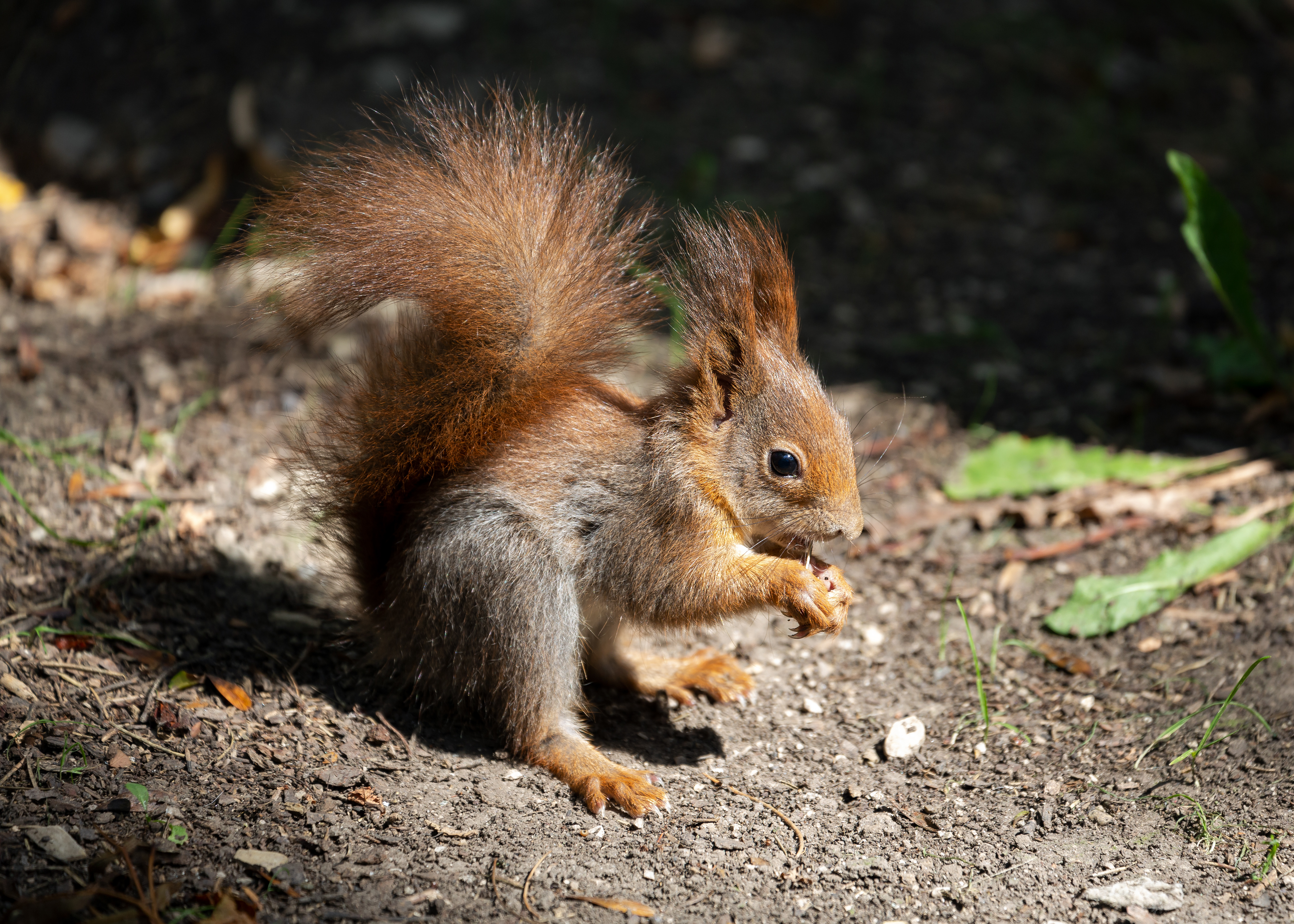
A squirrel in the park

The Prater is characterized by its botanical makeup as a hardwood riparian forest. The majority of the area is covered by a dense tree population, featuring predominantly black and silver poplars, maples, and ash trees. One of the key features of the Prater is its ancient tree stock, with several towering trees that have been growing for over 200 years.

The Prater is home to a wide variety of animal species. The abandoned water bodies are populated by waterfowl, including Mandarin ducks and mallards. Other bird species include magpies, jays, tits, finches, woodpeckers, wrens, robins, starlings, sparrows, as well as both hooded and carrion crows, kingfishers, and grey herons.

Beavers, dragonflies, and various fish species (European carp, round goby) inhabit the former river branches, and it is also possible to observe amphibians and reptiles, such as Aesculapian snakes, slow worms, smooth newts, European pond turtles, and pond sliders.

Mammals in the Prater's ecosystem include red foxes, roe deer, European badgers, red squirrels, and, more recently, raccoons.
