= Michael Bochow =

German sociologist

- Born: March 26, 1948; Germany
- Known for: Empirical studies of German gay men, particularly regarding HIV/AIDS
- Scientific career
- Fields: Sociology
- Institutions: Free University of Berlin

Michael Bochow (born 26 March 1948) is a German sociologist who has authored a number of empirical studies of German gay men with a particular focus on the impact of HIV/AIDS.

After completing his schooling in Lower Saxony, Bochow moved to Berlin, where he studied sociology and political science. After earning his Ph.D., he was employed as a sociologist at the Free University.

Beginning in 1987, Bochow distributed the first of what developed into a series of questionnaires concerning the behavior of homosexual men, surveying sex practices (both safe and risky) as well as the awareness of HIV, AIDS, and prevention among men who have sex with men. These studies, which were supplemented by interviews, were initially commissioned by the Deutsche AIDS-Hilfe, the national umbrella organization of over 100 local agencies offering education and providing services to people with HIV infections, and subsequently by the federal agency for health education.

Bochow has also investigated Germany's Turkish minority, particularly men who have sex with men. He has also authored studies of older gay men, of gay men who live outside of big cities, of lower-class gay men, and of social differences between gay men in western and eastern Germany.

== Works ==
- AIDS. Wie leben schwule Männer heute? Bericht über eine Befragung im Auftrag der Deutschen AIDS-Hilfe. Berlin: Deutsche AIDS-Hilfe e.V., 2nd ed. 1989. 123 pp.
- AIDS und Schwule. Individuelle Strategien und kollektive Bewältigung. Bericht über die zweite Befragung im Auftrag der Deutschen AIDS-Hilfe e.V. Berlin: Deutsche AIDS-Hilfe e.V., 1989. 119 pp.
- Schwuler Sex und die Bedrohung durch AIDS. Die Reaktionen homosexueller Männer auf AIDS in Ost- und Westdeutschland. Ergebnisbericht zu einer Befragung im Auftrag der Bundeszentrale für Gesundheitliche Aufklärung / Köln. Berlin: Deutsche AIDS-Hilfe e.V., 1994. 173 pp. ISBN 3-930425-07-6
- Informationsstand und präventive Vorkehrungen im Hinblick auf AIDS bei homosexuellen Männern der Unterschicht. Berlin: Deutsche AIDS-Hilfe e.V., 1997. 125 pp. ISBN 3-930425-21-1
- Schwules Leben in der Provinz: zum Beispiel Niedersachsen. Berlin: Edition Sigma, 1998. 195 pp. ISBN 3-89404-684-8
- Das kürzere Ende des Regenbogens. HIV-Infektionsrisiken und soziale Ungleichheit bei schwulen Männern. Berlin: Edition Sigma, 2000. 342 pp. ISBN 3-89404-685-6
- Schwule Männer, AIDS und Safer Sex - neue Entwicklungen. Eine Befragung im Auftrag der Bundeszentrale für gesundheitliche Aufklärung, Köln. Berlin: Intersofia and Deutsche AIDS-Hilfe, 2001. 143 pp. With English summary. ISBN 3-930425-42-4
- Homosexualität und Islam. Koran - Islamische Länder - Situation in Deutschland. Michael Bochow and Rainer Marbach, eds. Hamburg: MännerschwarmSkript Verlag, 2003. 159 pp. ISBN 3-935596-24-3
- Muslime unter dem Regenbogen. Homosexualität, Migration und Islam. Berlin: Querverlag, 2004. 270 pp. ISBN 3-89656-098-0
- Schwule Männer und AIDS. Risikomanagement in Zeiten der sozialen Normalisierung einer Infektionskrankheit. Eine Befragung im Auftrag der Bundeszentrale für gesundheitliche Aufklärung, Köln. By Christine Höpfner, Holger Sweers, Michael Bochow, and Michael T. Wright. Berlin: Deutsche AIDS-Hilfe, 2004. 190 pp. With English summary. ISBN 3-930425-54-8
- Ich bin doch schwul und will das immer bleiben. Schwule Männer im Dritten Lebensalter. Hamburg: MännerschwarmSkript Verlag, 2005. 369 pp. ISBN 3-935596-79-0
