= Pazmanitengasse =

Street in Leopoldstadt, Vienna, Austria

Pazmanitengasse is a street in Vienna Leopoldstadt district.

It was named in 1867 after (the students of) the Pázmáneum, the Hungarian Catholic seminary, later university, founded in 1619 by Cardinal Péter Pázmány, an important figure in the Counter-Reformation and the father of modern Hungarian language.

The street was home to one of the largest synagogues in Vienna (the Pazmanitentempel, built since 1910), until its destructions in 1938 during Kristallnacht.
