= Heinrich Rauchinger =

Austrian painter (1858–1942)

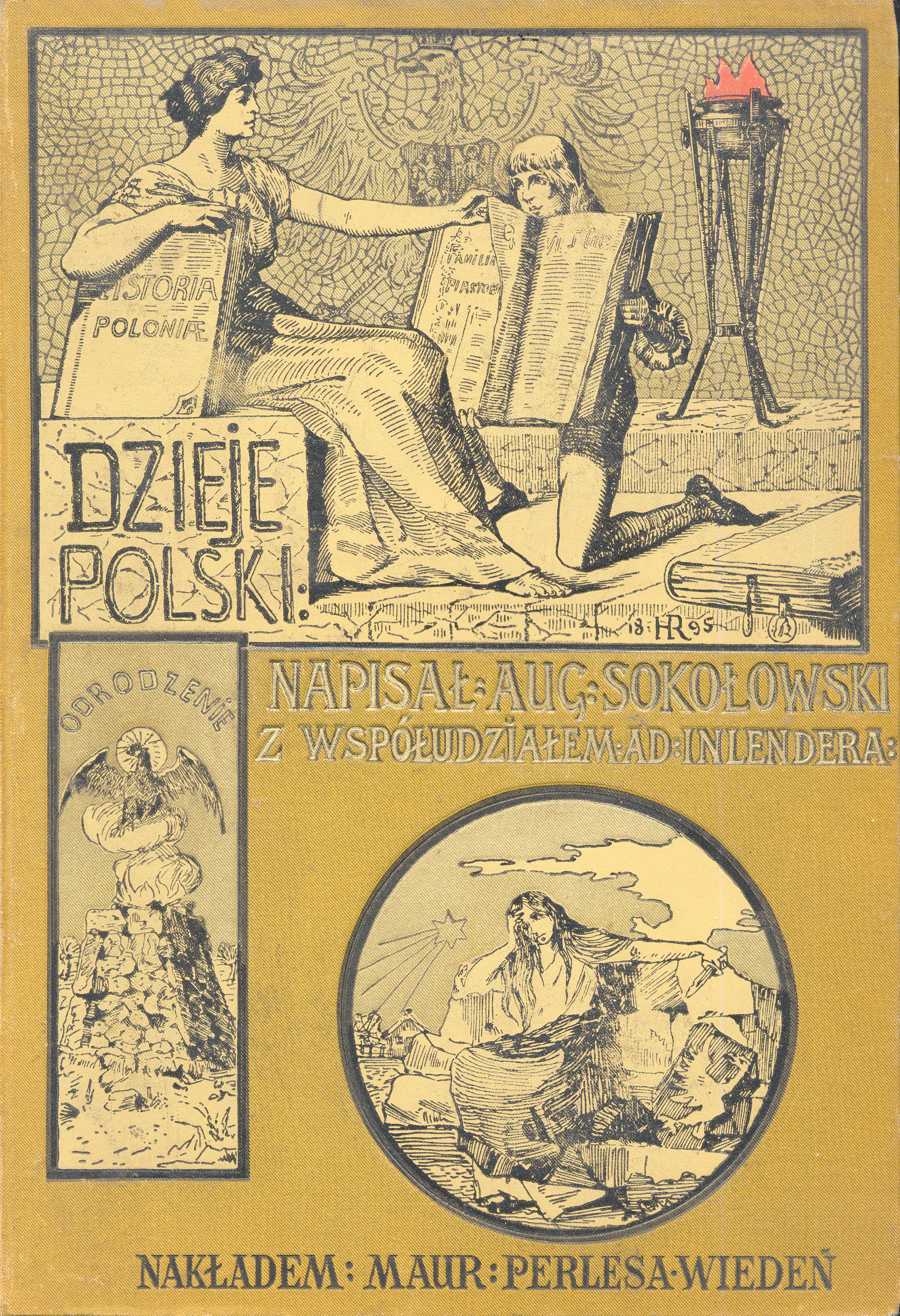
- Dzieje Polski book cover designed by Rauchinger
- Born: 1 January 1858; Kraków, Austrian Empire
- Died: 19 August 1942 (aged 84); Theresienstadt, Protectorate of Bohemia and Moravia

Heinrich Rauchinger (Polish name Henryk, pronounced /xɛnrɨk/, 1858–1942) was a Kraków-born history painter and portrait painter.

== Life ==
Rauchinger was born 1 January 1858.

During the years 1878–1879 he studied at the Jan Matejko Academy of Fine Arts in Kraków under Jan Matejko and afterwards at Academy of Fine Arts Vienna under August Eisenmenger and Christian Griepenkerl.

In 1886, after graduating, a scholarship enabled him to spend two years in Italy, especially in Rome, where he completed his training and did numerous landscape studies.

From 1888 he lived as a freelance artist in Vienna, where he presented his works at many painting exhibitions. In the years 1883–1899 he also exhibited at the Kraków Society of Friends of Fine Arts. In 1894 he participated in an exhibition of Polish art in Lviv.

He mainly dealt with portrait painting, creating portraits of Walter Breisky, Bertha von Suttner, and Stefan Zweig. He also designed book covers for Dzieje Polski (History of Poland) by August Sokołowski.

In 1895 Rauchinger converted from Judaism to Catholicism. After the joining of Austria with the Third Reich, he became a victim of Nazi Germany's antisemitic persecution. On 10 July 1942, at the age of 84, he was arrested and deported. He died on 19 August 1942 in Theresienstadt. His last place of residence before deportation was in Leopoldstadt.

== Works (selection) ==
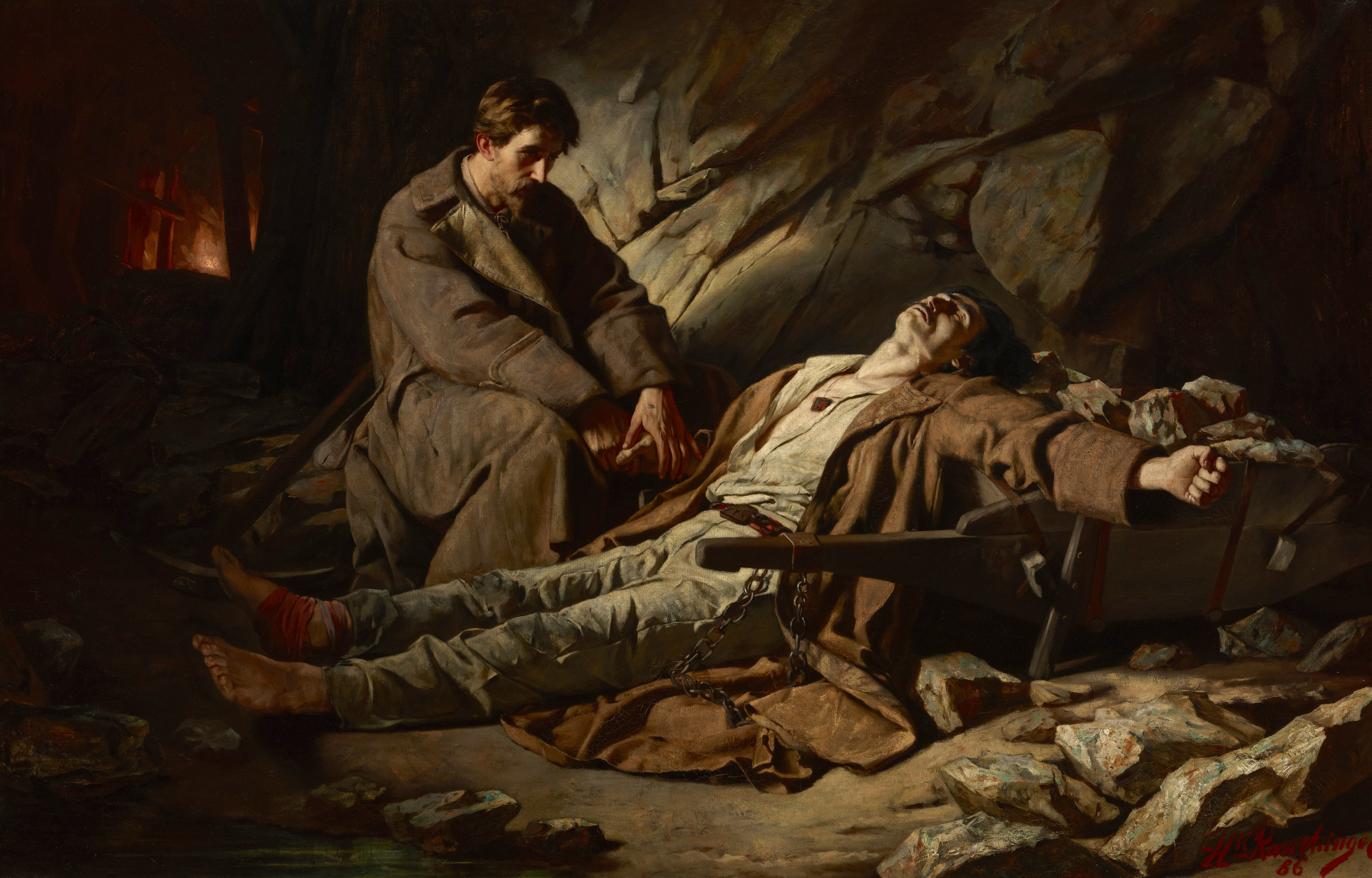
Heinrich Rauchinger: W katordze, 1886

- An early painting from 1886 with the Polish title W katordze ("In prison"), oil on canvas, 114 × 178 cm, is on display in the National Museum, Kraków.
- Four portraits in oil on canvas from around 1897–1920 are in the collection of the Jewish Museum in Prague.
- Portrait of Walter Breisky, 1922. Oil on canvas, approx. 110 × 90 cm, Museum of Military History, Vienna.
