= Péter Pázmány =

Cardinal, Archbishop of Esztergom and Prince Primate of Hungary (1570-1637)

His Eminence Péter Pázmány S.J.
- Cardinal Archbishop of Esztergom; Prince Primate of Hungary
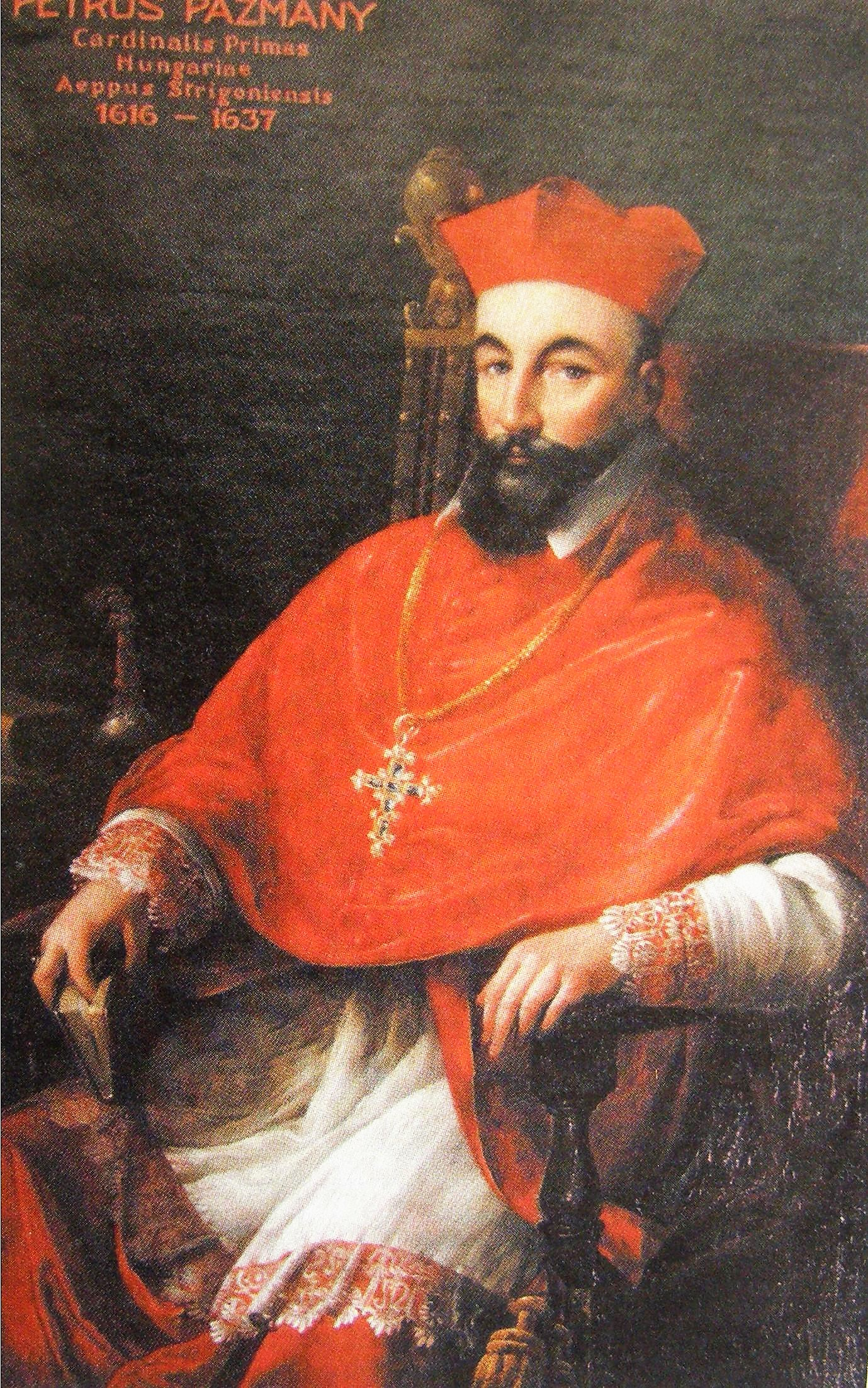
- See: Esztergom
- Appointed: 28 November 1616
- Term ended: 19 March 1637
- Predecessor: Ferenc Forgách
- Successor: Imre Lósy
- Other posts: Cardinal Priest of the Church of Saint Jerome of the Croats (1632–1637), Provost of Turóc (1616)

Orders
- Ordination: 1596
- Consecration: 12 March 1617 by Cardinal Melchior Klesl
- Created cardinal: 19 November 1629
- Rank: Cardinal Priest

Personal details
- Born: 4 October 1570 Nagyvárad, Principality of Transylvania
- Died: 19 March 1637 (aged 66) Pozsony, Royal Hungary
- Buried: St Martin's Cathedral, Bratislava
- Parents: Miklós Pázmány; Margit Massai
- Education: University of Vienna & Pontifical Gregorian University
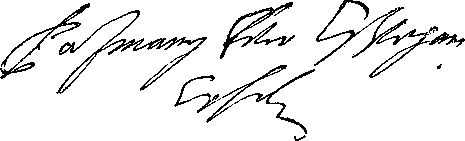
- Signature

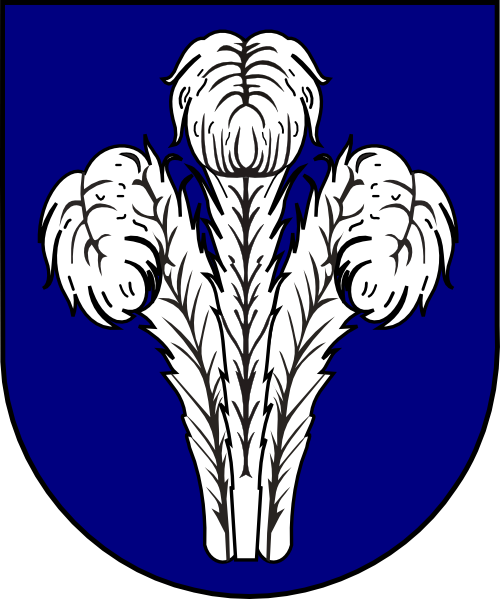
- Coat of arms

Péter Pázmány de Panasz, S.J. (Hungarian: panaszi Pázmány Péter, pronounced [ˈpɒnɒsi ˈpaːzmaːɲ ˈpeːtɛr]; Latin: Petrus Pazmanus; German: Peter Pazman; Slovak: Peter Pázmaň; 4 October 1570 – 19 March 1637), was a Hungarian Jesuit who was a noted philosopher, theologian, cardinal, pulpit orator and statesman. He was an important figure in the Counter-Reformation in Royal Hungary.

Pázmány's most important legacy was his creation of the Hungarian literary language. As an orator he was dubbed "the Hungarian Cicero in the purple". In 1867, a street in Vienna, the Pazmanitengasse, was named after him.

== Biography ==
=== Early life ===
Pázmány was born in 1570 in Nagyvárad, in the Principality of Transylvania (today Oradea, Romania), the son of Miklós Pázmány, vice-ispán of Bihar County. As a young man he was educated there and, under the Jesuits, in Kolozsvár (Cluj), which is where he converted from the Calvinist Reformed Church of Hungary to Roman Catholicism in 1583, partly under the influence of his stepmother, a Catholic. In 1587, he entered the Society of Jesus.

Upon entering the Jesuit Order, Pázmány went through his novitiate at Kraków, after which he studied philosophy in University of Vienna (1589–1592), and then theology at the Collegio Romano in Rome (now the Pontifical Gregorian University) under St. Robert Bellarmine, S.J. (1592–1596), after which he was ordained to the priesthood there. He was made a Doctor of Theology in 1597.

After his studies, Pázmány was sent to Graz, Austria, first serving on the staff of the Jesuit college there for a year, then lecturing in theology at the University of Graz. In 1601, he was sent to the Society's establishment at Sellye (today Šaľa, Slovakia), where his eloquence and dialectic won hundreds to Catholicism, including many of the noblest families. Count Miklós Esterházy and Pál Rákóczi were among his converts.

In 1607 Pázmány entered the court of Archbishop Ferenc Forgách of Esztergom. The following year he attracted attention in the Diet of Hungary by his denunciation of the 8th point of the Peace of Vienna, which prohibited the Jesuits from acquiring landed property in Hungary. Particularly remarkable from this period is Pázmány's Guide to Truth, which appeared in 1613. This manual was judged to have united all the advantages of scientific depth, methodical arrangement and popular style.

At the initiative of the archbishop and the request of King Matthias II of Hungary, Pope Paul V, by an apostolic brief dated 5 March 1616, granted Pázmány permission to leave the Society of Jesus and to enter the Somascan Clerics Regular; he never left the Jesuit Order, however, so there was only the submission of a request by third parties and the granting of a permission to leave.

=== Primate of Hungary ===
On 25 April 1616 Pázmány was appointed the Provost of Turóc (Slovak Turiec), and on 28 September he was appointed by the Holy See as Archbishop of Esztergom, the Primate of Hungary. Pázmány was to become the soul of the Catholic Counter-Reformation in Hungary.

As the chief pastor of the Catholic Church in Hungary, Pázmány used every means in his power, short of absolute contravention of the laws, to obstruct and weaken Protestantism, which had risen during the 16th century. In 1619, he founded a seminary for theological candidates in Trnava, and in 1623 laid the foundations of a similar institution at Vienna, the still famous Pázmáneum, at a cost of 200,000 florins. In 1635, he contributed 100,000 florins towards the foundation of the university in Trnava. The Faculty of Theology was later turned into Pázmány Péter Catholic University, and the rest of the university became what is now known as Eötvös Loránd University, which, from 1921 to 1950, was known as Péter Pázmány University. Its theological faculty became Catholic Péter Pázmány University, Budapest/Piliscsaba, in 1992. Pázmány also built Jesuit colleges and schools at Bratislava (Pressburg), and Franciscan monasteries at Nové Zámky (Érsekújvár in Hungarian) and Kremnica, all located in modernday Slovakia.

Pázmány played a considerable part in the politics of his day. It was chiefly due to him that the Diet of 1618 elected Archduke Ferdinand to succeed the childless Matthias. He also repeatedly thwarted the martial ambitions of Gabriel Bethlen, and prevented George I Rákóczi, over whom he had a great influence, from allying with the Ottoman Empire and the Protestants.

Pázmány was created a Cardinal Priest by Pope Urban VIII in the consistory of 19 November 1629. He received the red hat of a cardinal from the pope on 31 May 1629 at which time he was assigned for his titular church to Saint Jerome of the Croats.

=== Death ===
[[File:Pazmany-Peter writer.jpg|thumb|240px|right|

Jesuit and Cardinal Péter Pázmány
He tirelessly wrote letters and books, both alone and with his assistants, and proved the correctness of Catholic faith in comparison with Protestant teachings (painting from 17th century)]]

Pázmány died in Pressburg in 1637 and was buried underneath the floor of St. Martin's Cathedral, at the foot of the ancient tomb of St. John the Almsgiver, which he had embellished during his reign.

Pázmány's grave was discovered during reconstruction on 12 September 1859 by the Rev. Ferdinand Knauz and others. They found the body dry yet almost intact. His face was missing the nose and lips but was still bearded, and he still had his biretta on his head with some hair underneath. He was wearing red damask vestments and had simple leather shoes on his feet.

== Works ==
- The Four Books of Thomas à Kempis on the imitation of Christ (Hungarian, 1603), of which there are many editions
- Christian Prayer Book, 1606, translated in English by Christianfaith.info
- Diatribe theologica de visible Christi in terris ecclesia (Graz, 1615)
- Vindiciae ecclesiasticae (Vienna, 1620);
- Sermons for every Sunday in the Year (Hung., Pressburg, 1636)
- The Triumph of Truth (Hungarian, Pressburg, 1614)

== Sources ==
Grazer philosophische Disputationen von Péter Pázmány, ed. Paul Richard Blum and Emil Hargittay, Piliscsaba (Katholische Péter-Pázmány-Universität) 2003.

Pázmány Péter és kora [P. P. and his times], ed. Emil Hargittay, Piliscsaba (Pázmány Péter Katolikus Egyetem) 2001.

== Honors ==
Péter Pázmány was commemorated by Hungary by issuing six postage stamps on 25 September 1935.

== Sources ==
- This article incorporates text from a publication now in the public domain: Bain, Robert Nisbet (1911). "Pázmány, Péter". Encyclopædia Britannica. Vol. 21 (11th ed.). p. 2.
- Herbermann, Charles, ed. (1911). "Peter Pázmány" . Catholic Encyclopedia. Vol. 11. New York: Robert Appleton Company.
- Vilmos Fraknói, Péter Pázmány and his Times (Hung. Pest, 1868–1872); Correspondence of Pázmány (Hung. and Latin), published by the Hungarian Academy of Sciences (Pest, 1873). (R. N. B.)

Catholic Church titles
Preceded by Ferenc Forgách	Archbishop of Esztergom; 28 November 1616 – 19 March 1637	Succeeded by Imre Lósy
