= Prater Liliputbahn =

Narrow gauge light railway in Vienna, Austria

Coordinates: 48°12′36″N 16°24′24″E

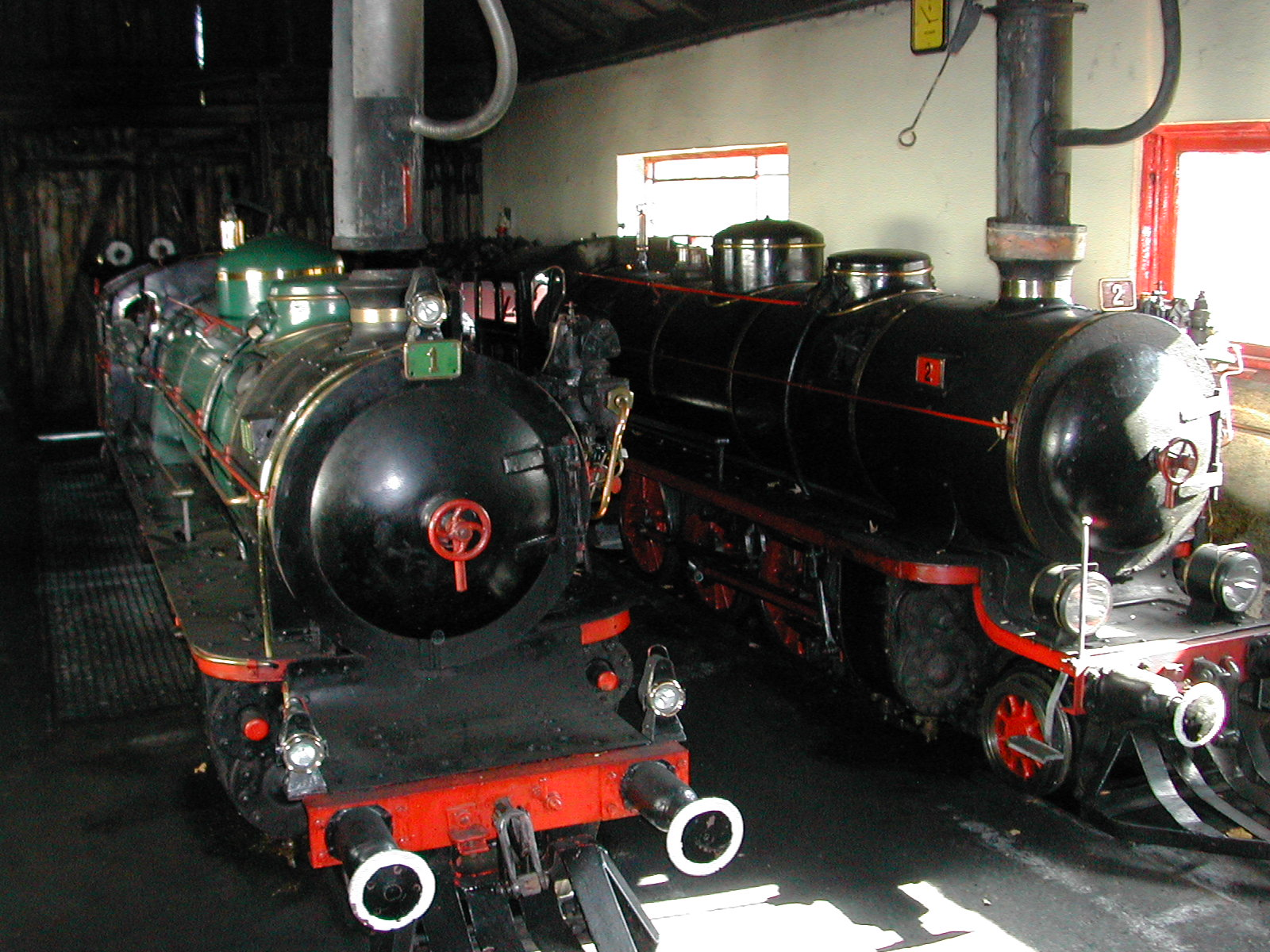
Locomotives 1 and 2 in the Steam Shed.

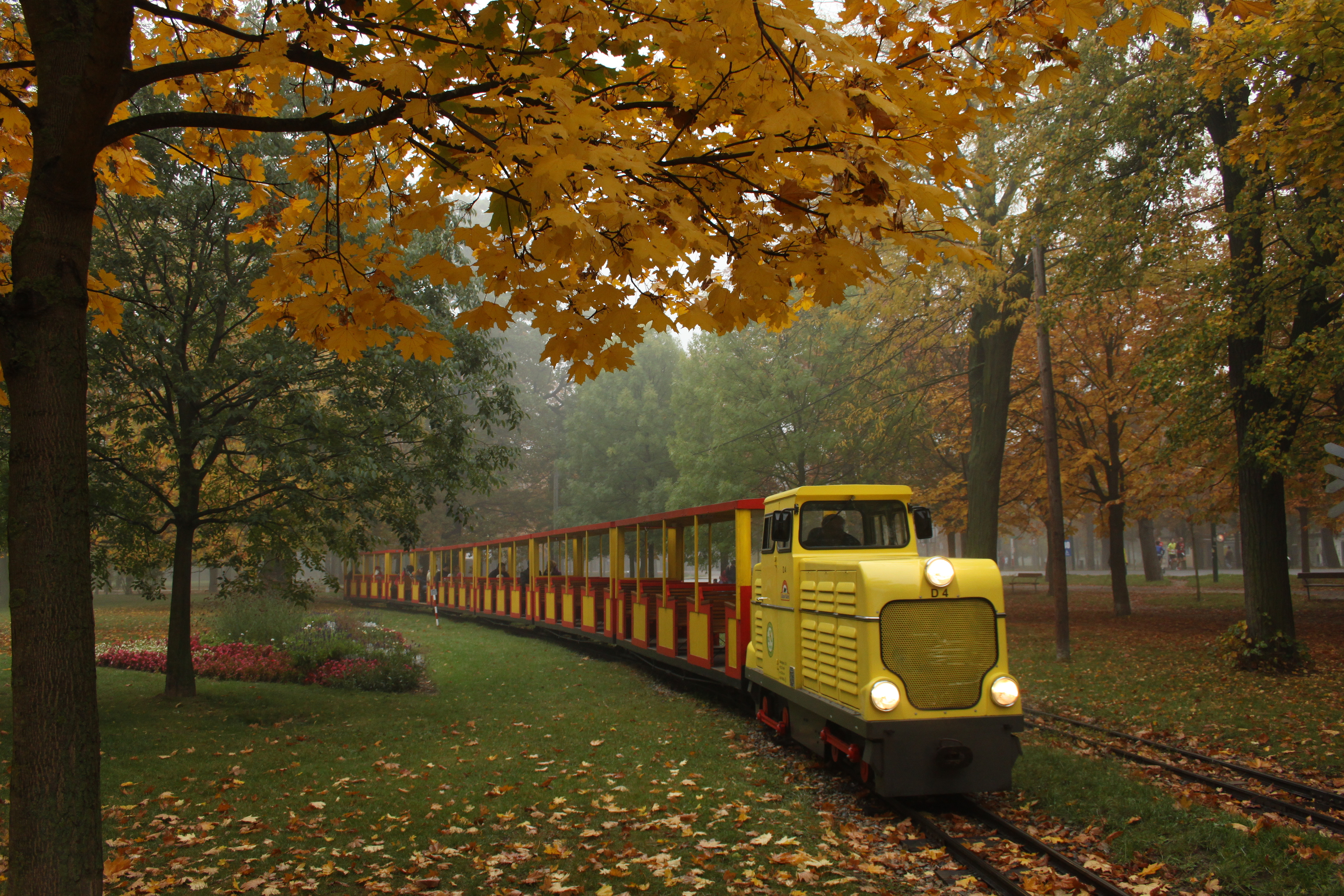
Locomotive D4 following reconstruction (compare with picture below).

The Prater Liliputbahn is a 381 mm (15 in) gauge light railway in Vienna, Austria. Opened in 1928, and extended in 1933, the railway, which operates primarily as a tourist attraction, runs for almost 4 kilometres (2.5 mi) around the Prater park, an extensive public recreation area in the Austrian capital. Originally a year-round service, the railway now operates from March to October. Initially steam-operated, the railway now uses a mixture of steam and diesel motive power.

The railway is named after the fictional island Lilliput, inhabited by tiny people in Gulliver's Travels by Jonathan Swift.

== History ==
The railway opened on 1 May 1928, the line runs for almost 4 kilometres (2.5 mi) around the Prater and the adjoining Wurstelprater amusement park. At its opening, it ran for 2 kilometres (1.2 mi). The design for a 15 in (381 mm) gauge locomotive was drawn up in 1923 by Chief Engineer Martens of the Mthe Munich-based engineering firm Krauss and Company, based on a German 1,435 mm (4 ft 8+1/2 in) standard gauge 4-6-2 design. Twenty of these locomotives were built between 1925 and 1950. Three locomotives from the second batch were ordered for the Prater Liliputbahn, but only two were delivered and are still operating there today. The order for the third engine was cancelled. The railway was extended in 1933, almost doubling its length. The entire 3.95-kilometre route is marked every 100 metres with white-painted milestones.

== Stations ==
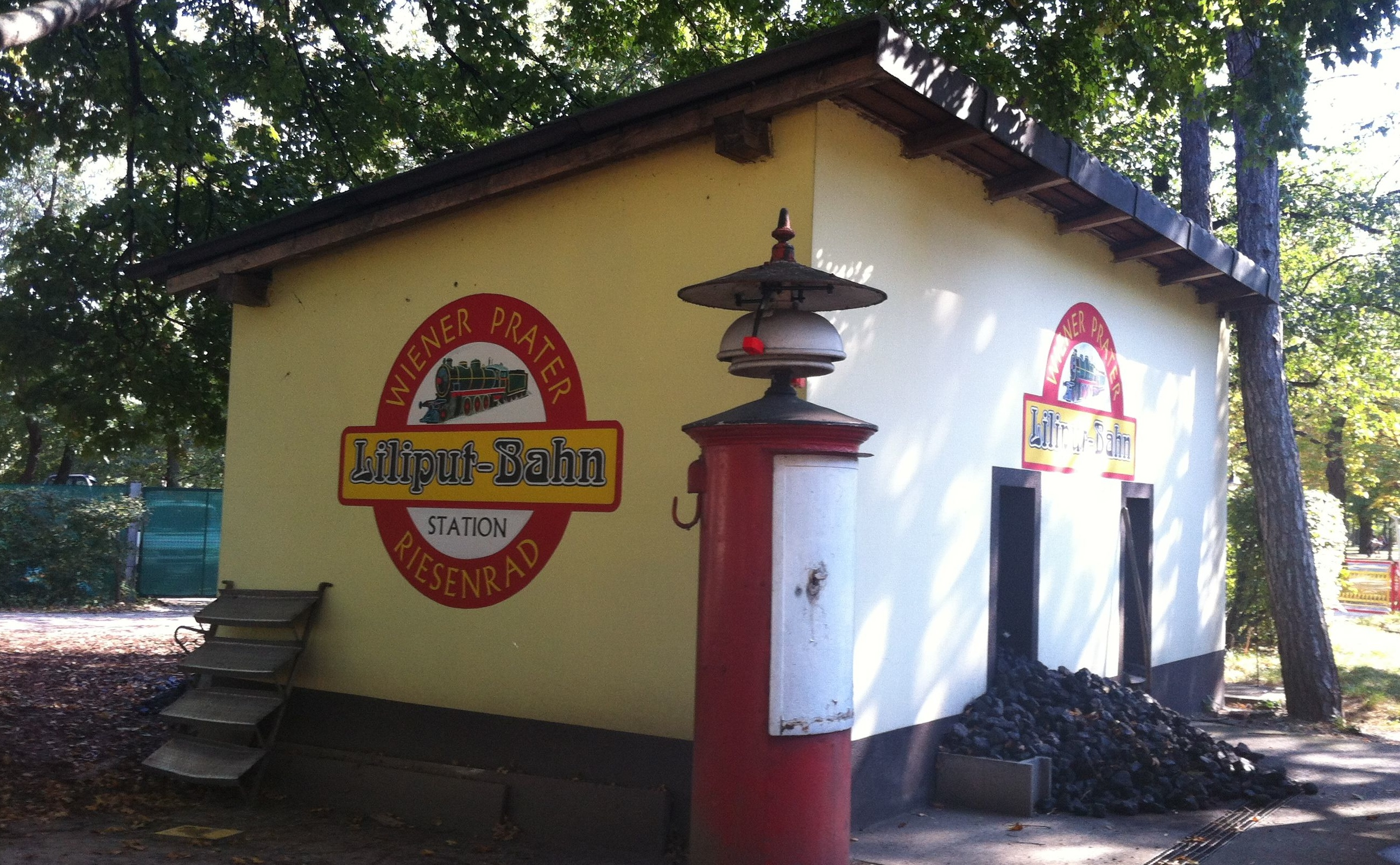
Prater Hauptbahnhof (Central Station), showing the locomotive fueling area.

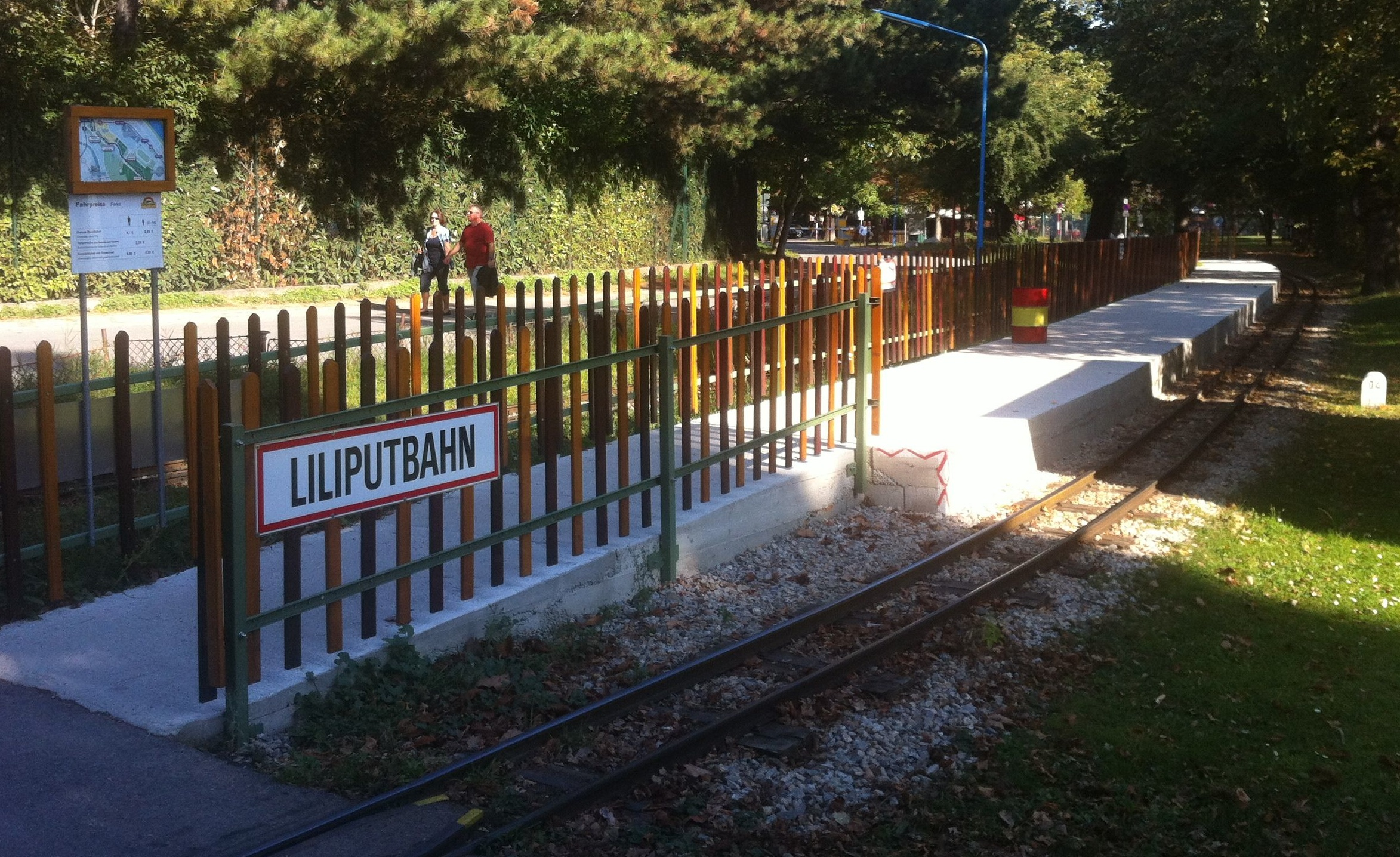
Schweizerhaus Luftburg (Swiss House Station), showing the single platform.

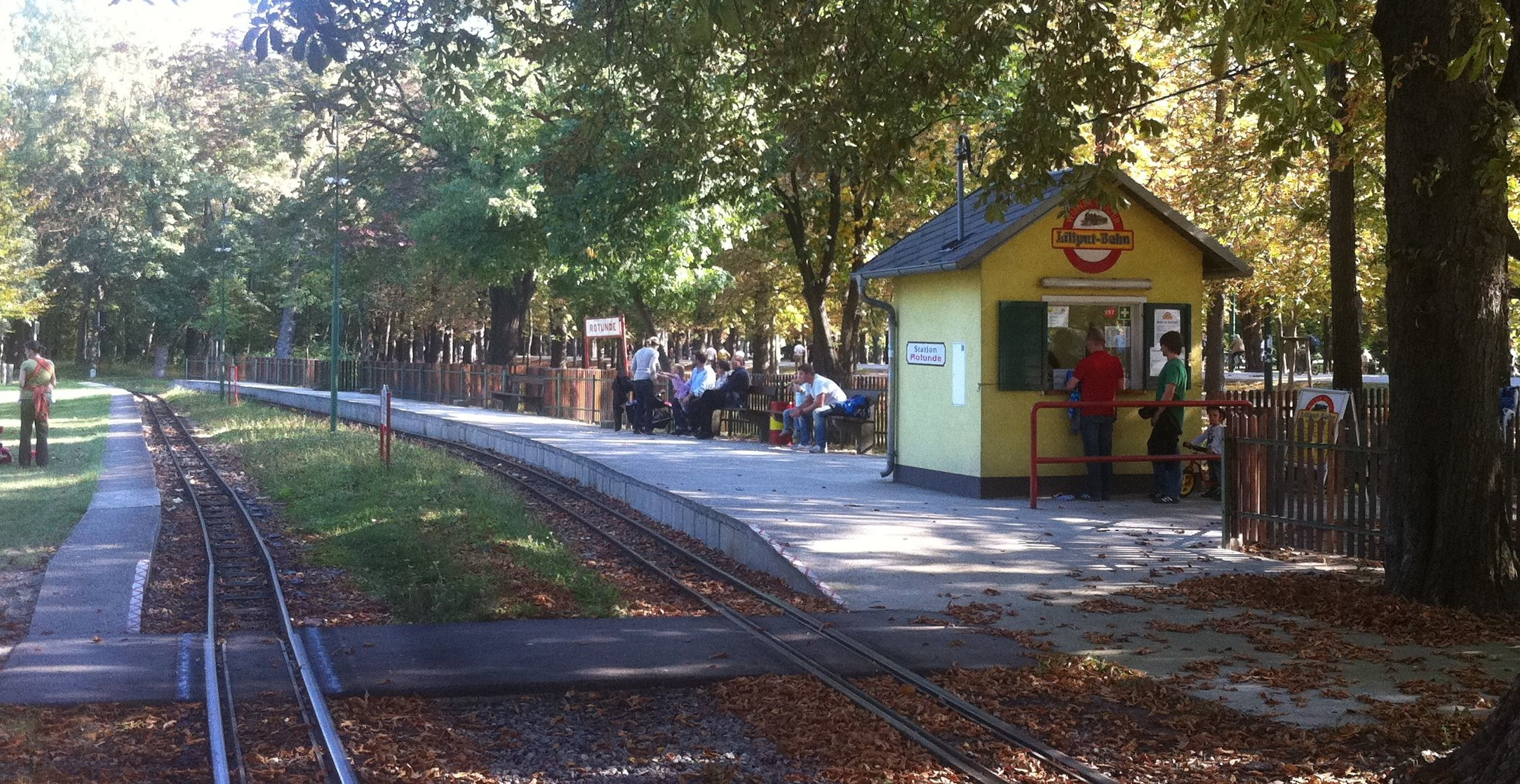
Rotunde (Rotunda Station), showing both platforms and booking office.

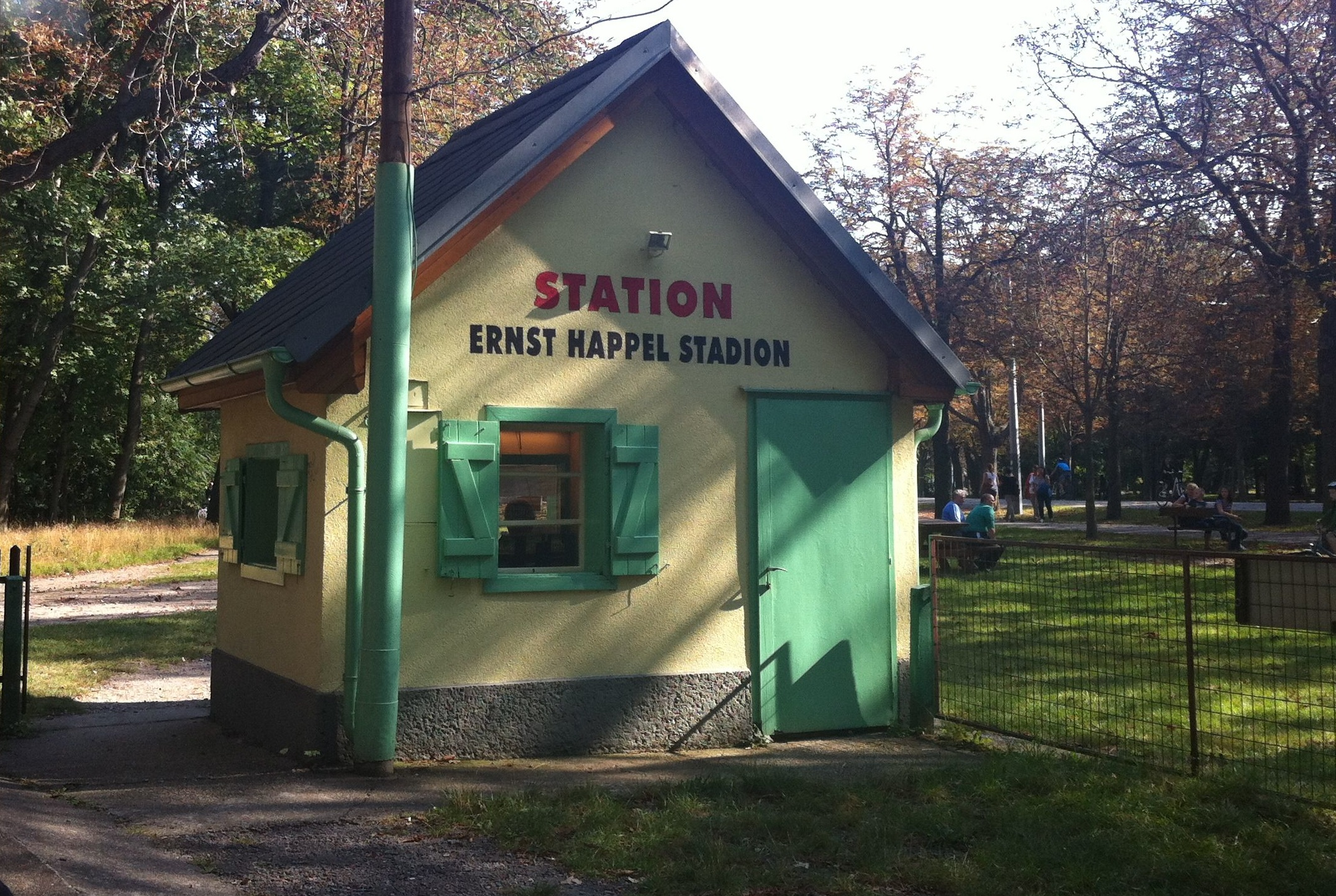
Ernst-Happel Stadion (Stadium Station), showing the booking office.

Although there is no 'true' terminus station since both ends of the line feature turning loops, Prater Hauptbahnhof and Rotunde were originally built to serve the two ends of the original (shorter) railway. When the line was extended to the Ernst-Happel sports stadium in 1933, a new 'terminus' was constructed. The newest station opened in 2011, in partnership with local businesses. The main line is double track throughout, allowing trains to run in both directions at the same time.

=== Prater Hauptbahnhof ===
Situated within the Prater amusement park, this station (English: Prater Central Station) serves as the headquarters of the railway. Facilities include a large staff room, a ticket office, and provisions for coaling and watering steam locomotives. Nearby is the main railway depot, which comprises a three-road steam shed and a large carriage shed that also houses the diesel locomotives. There are two platforms, both located on the outside of the turning loop, effectively forming two stations.

For most of its history, the railway required passengers to alight at one platform and board at the other to manage passenger flow. However, this practice was gradually phased out in the early 21st century and ended by 2011. The former 'arrival' platform is now largely unused but is still maintained for special events.

=== Schweizerhaus Luftburg ===
This new station opened in March 2011. The station's name (English: Swiss House - Air Castle) comes from two nearby restaurants, the Schweizerhaus and the Luftburg, on the southern edge of the amusement park. The station has a single platform, as trains stop only in the eastbound direction (leaving the Prater).

=== Rotunde ===
Once the easternmost limit of the railway, this station has been an intermediate station since 1933. It features two platforms with a ticket office. The station saw a significant increase in traffic after a tram line was completed, linking Vienna city centre to the rotunda. Trams terminate at a stop less than a minute's walk from Rotunda Station, giving the Prater Liliputbahn a direct connection to the Vienna public transport system.

=== Ernst-Happel-Stadion ===
The line terminates in the woods west of the Ernst-Happel-Stadion, the largest stadium in the city. The station features a single platform at the entrance to the turning loop and includes a ticket office. Upon departure, trains make a sharp turn into the loop, passing through the trees before rejoining the main line for the return journey.

== Locomotives ==
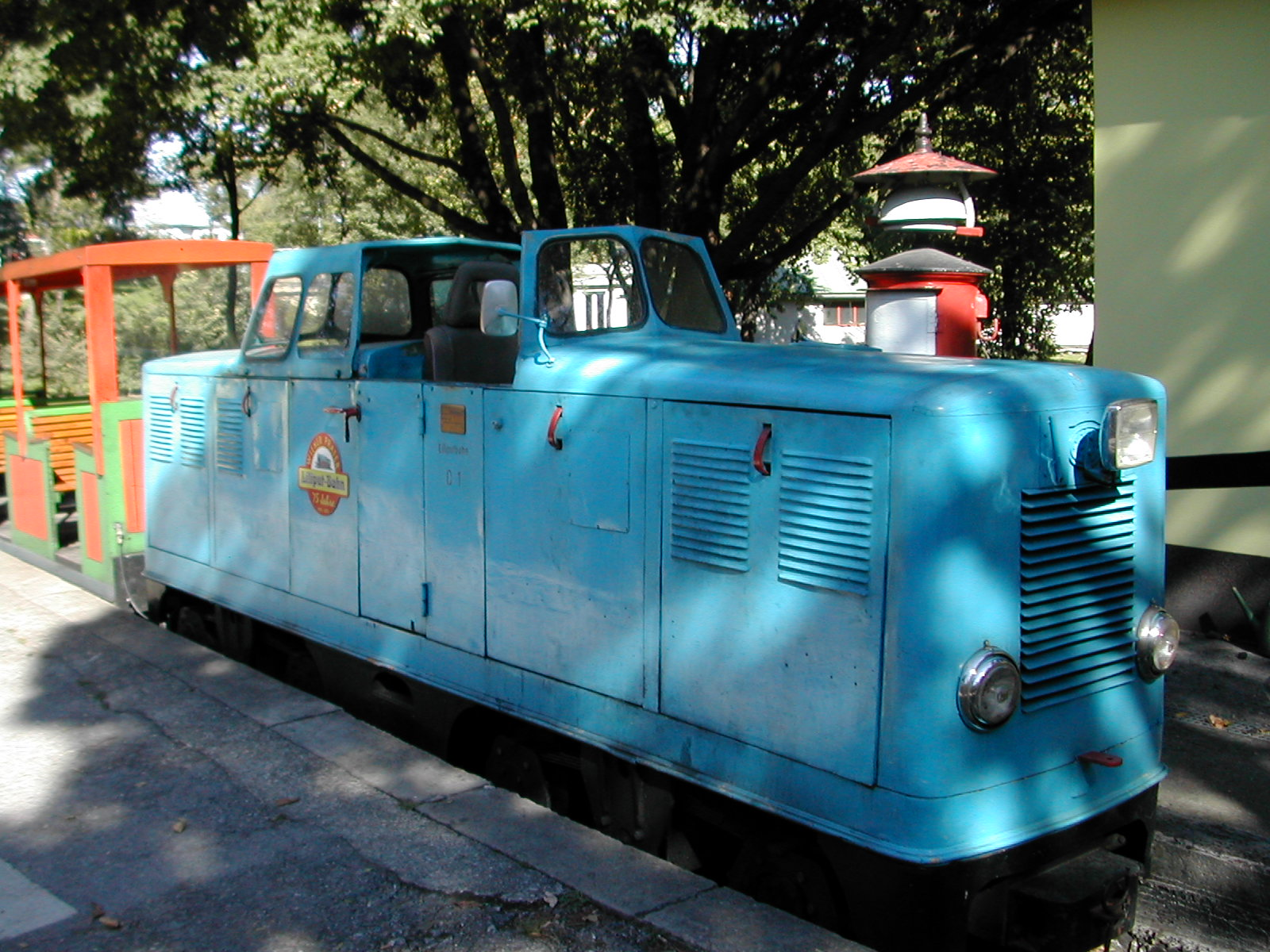
Locomotive D1 on a service train at Prater Central Station.

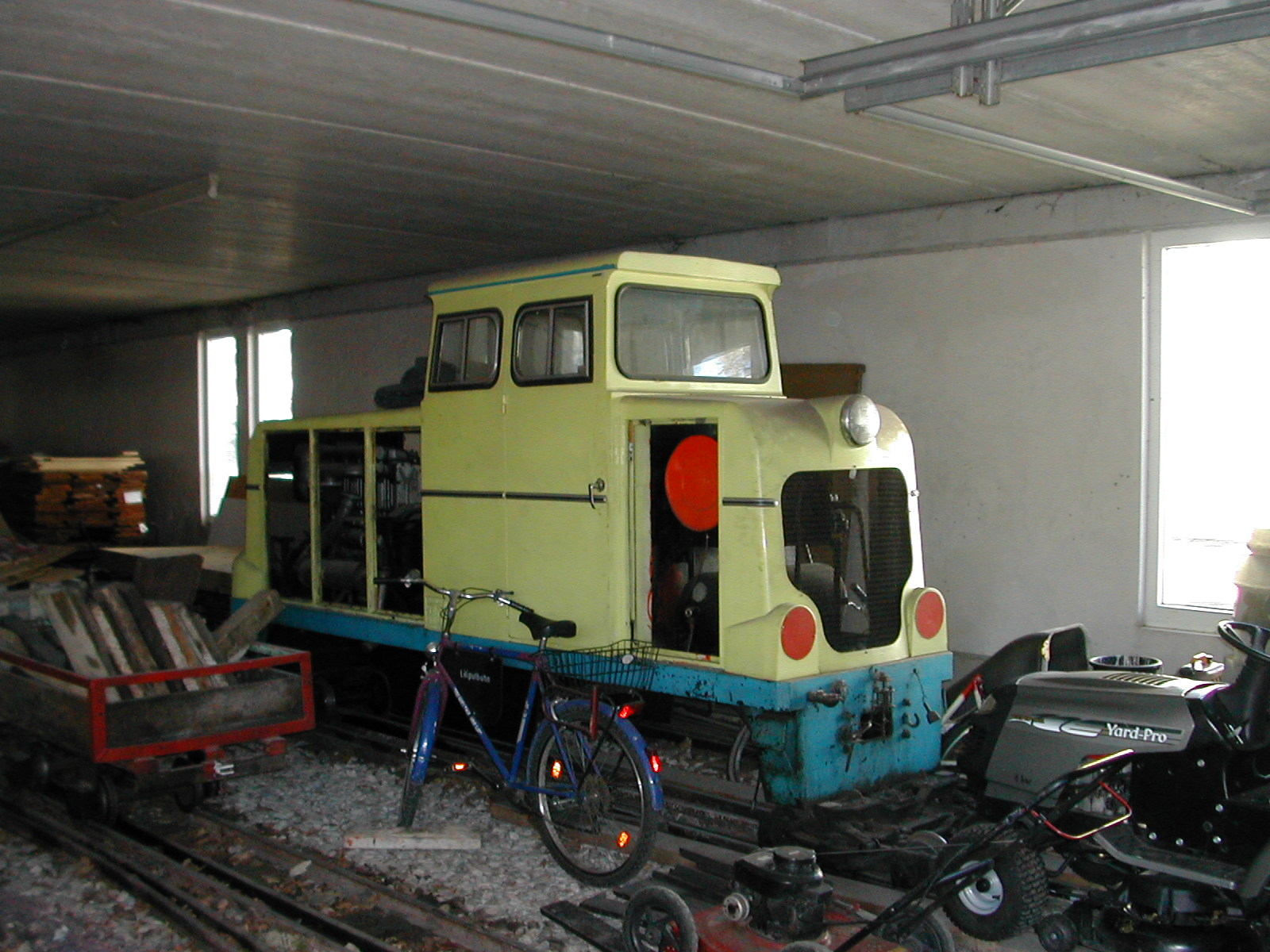
Locomotive D4 in dilapidated condition in the carriage shed in 2003; this locomotive has since been rebuilt and returned to service in 2009.

=== Steam engines ===
The two original 4-6-2 'Pacific' steam locomotives are still in operation, numbered 1 and 2. They are used in summer high-season operations. Three such engines were ordered from Krauss & Company, but the third was cancelled before delivery, due to initially poor passenger numbers. This third locomotive had, however, already been built. The builders, Krauss, who had sent the first three locomotives of this class to a Munich transport exhibition in 1925, and subsequently on tour (with positive sales results) now used the 'spare' locomotive for similar tours of engineering exhibitions. Its eventual fate is unknown. However, after the 1933 lengthening of the line, traffic increased, and eventually a third locomotive was again required. It was ordered from Krauss, who were still constructing the same class of locomotive as Nos. 1 and 2 (construction continued until 1950) and entered service as No. 3 in 1942. This third locomotive was subsequently withdrawn and scrapped, its wheels and frames being used to construct a diesel locomotive, still in service as locomotive D2. The original boiler of No 3 is still on static display in the Prater park.

=== Diesel engines ===
During the bulk of the year the railway is operated by its four diesel locomotives, numbered D1 to D4. Locomotive D4 underwent an extensive rebuild and renewal in 2009, following several years out of service. Although none of the locomotives carry nameplates, and the official website makes no mention of locomotive names, the English translation website of the railway company does assign names to each of the locomotives currently in service. The diesel engines provide year-round service, even when the steam engines are in use, as the high season operation of the line requires three locomotives off-peak, and four locomotives at peak times.

=== Hydrogen engine ===
In 2018 an experimental locomotive was moved to the railway, powered by electricity, with generation through a hydrogen fuel cell in a tender. The locomotive is intended to demonstrate the capabilities of hydrogen power for the wider rail industry, and has been developed by a consortium consisting of ÖBB Infra (a division of the Austrian Federal Railways), Liliputbahn/TEMO, Air Liquide, Railway Competence and Certification GmbH, and Prosoft Süd Consulting GmbH. The locomotive has been named Hydro-Lilly.

=== Summary of motive power ===
Locomotive Number	Locomotive Type	Year Built	Builder	In service?	Notes
Steam Locomotives
1	4-6-2	1928	Krauss & Co., Munich	Yes	Original locomotive. Builder number: 8441.
2	4-6-2	1928	Krauss & Co., Munich	Yes	Original locomotive. Builder number: 8442.
3	4-6-2	1928	Krauss & Co., Munich	No	Builder number: 8445. Rebuilt as D2, below.
Diesel Locomotives
D1	B'2'	1957	Gebus, Vienna & Salzburg	Yes	The oldest diesel, still in regular service.
D2	4-6-2	1961	Schreiner & Sohn, Vienna	Yes	Diesel locomotive built on frames, wheels, and motion of original steam locomotive 3 (see above).
D3	2'B2'	1964	Schreiner & Sohn, Vienna	Yes	This engine and a rake of carriages are currently running in an all-over pink advertising livery for Manner biscuits.
D4	B'B'	1967	Tobisch KG, Vienna	Yes	After several years out of use this engine was heavily rebuilt and returned to traffic in 2009.
Hydrogen (electric) Locomotives
?	2'B2'	2018	OBB, Temo, RCC	On trial	Experimental hydrogen locomotive "Hydro-Lilly" undergoing tests from April 2018 onwards.

=== Environmental upgrade ===
Following extensive conversations with local authorities and environmental groups, the Prater Liliputbahn has become a world pioneer in the use of environmentally friendly miniature railway locomotion. A refurbishment programme commenced in 2008, with the diesel locomotives converted (in numerical order, starting with engine D1) to burning recycled vegetable oil. The effect is carbon-neutral operation. Locomotive D4 was harder to convert, owing to its engine type, but by 2010 all diesel locomotives had been converted. These engines are now powered by vegetable oil recycled from the restaurants of the Prater amusement park.

The locomotive Hydro-Lilly (see above) is a further stage in the railway's development of environmentally-friendly traction.

== Rolling stock ==
An extensive stock of passenger coaches is sufficient to operate four passenger trains simultaneously. There is also a limited stock of wagons, used for maintenance purposes. The standard passenger carriage has 16 seats, in four compartments, of four seats each, two facing the direction of travel, and two with backs to the direction of travel. Each standard coach will therefore accommodate sixteen adults, or a larger number of children. A small number of coaches have received alteration so as to be able to accommodate wheel chairs. One coach has a non-standard seating pattern, with bench type seats around the four sides of a central table in one half of the carriage, and standard compartments in the other half. There are no specialist vehicles for luggage or guards, but a compartment is reserved for the train guard on each train.

The current passenger coaches, although rebuilt and repaired with time, still operate on the original frames. In normal operation each train consists of a set of six carriages. There are twenty-four principal carriages, made up into four train sets, and currently each individual set is painted in a particular livery, including two that advertise local businesses. Passenger coaches and goods wagons are maintained on site by the railway's staff.

== See also ==
- Fifteen-inch gauge railway
