= Leopoldstadt =

Coordinates: 48°12′37″N 16°24′44″E

Leopoldstadt Leopoidstod (Bavarian)
- 2nd District of Vienna
- Coat of arms

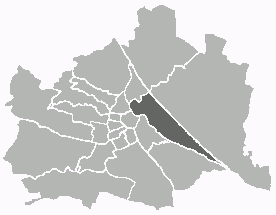
- Location of the district within Vienna
- Country: Austria
- City: Vienna

Government
  - District Director: Alexander Nikolai (SPÖ Wien)
  - First Deputy: Christopher Zich (SPÖ Wien)
  - Second Deputy: Seitz Bernhard (Green)

Area
  - Total: 19.27 km^{2} (7.44 sq mi)

Population (2016-01-01)
  - Total: 103,233
  - Density: 5,357/km^{2} (13,880/sq mi)
- Postal code: A-1020
- Address of district office: Karmelitergasse 9 A-1020 Wien
- Website: wien.gv.at/bezirke/leopoldstadt/

Leopoldstadt (German pronunciation: [ˈleːopɔldˌʃtat]; Viennese: Leopoidstod; lit. 'Leopold-Town') is the second municipal district of Vienna (German: 2. Bezirk) in Austria. As of 1 January 2016, there are 103,233 inhabitants over 19.27 km^{2} (7 sq mi). It is situated in the heart of the city and, together with Brigittenau (20th district), forms a large island surrounded by the Danube Canal and, to the north, the Danube. It is named after Leopold I, Holy Roman Emperor. Due to its relatively high percentage of Jewish inhabitants before the Holocaust (38.5 percent in 1923), Leopoldstadt gained the nickname Mazzesinsel ('Matzo Island'). This context was a significant aspect for the district twinning with the New York City borough Brooklyn in 2007.

== Landmarks ==
Places of interest include the Wiener Prater (from Latin pratum meaning 'meadow'), former imperial hunting grounds to which the public was denied access until 1766. The area of the Prater closest to the city centre contains a large amusement park, known as the Volksprater ('People's Prater') or Wurstelprater (after the Harlequin-type figure of Hanswurst), and at its entrance there is the giant Wiener Riesenrad Ferris wheel opened in 1897 which features prominently in the movie The Third Man and which has become one of Vienna's landmarks. The Schweizerhaus ('Swiss Hut'), an establishment boasting a huge beer garden, sells the original Czech Budweiser draught beer. The owners claim that, back in the 1920s, the potato crisp was invented there. Nearby you can find the "Republic of Kugelmugel", a micronation proclaimed in 1984 that became a landmark of the area. There is also a miniature steam railway (Liliputbahn) which, on its track through the woodland parallel to the Hauptallee, passes Vienna's Ernst-Happel-Stadion.

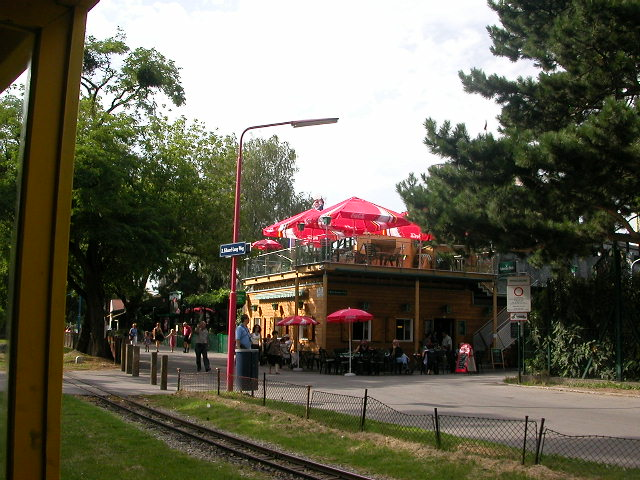
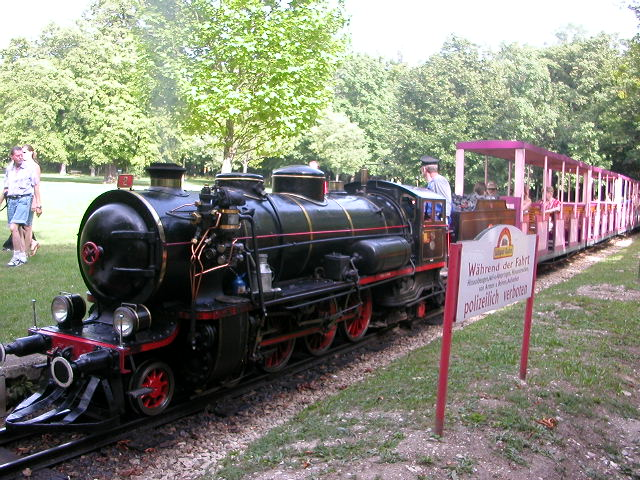
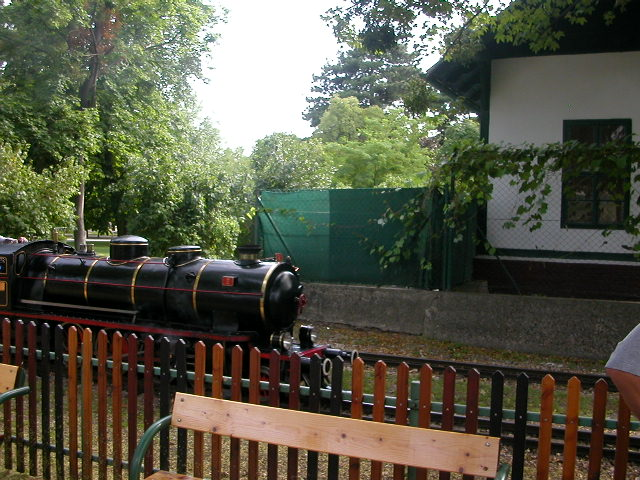
Prater Liliputbahn

Another, smaller, park in Leopoldstadt is the topiary-type Augarten, which is the home of the Vienna Boys' Choir and of a porcelain manufactory (Augarten-Porzellan). Its distinguishing marks are two disused Flak towers built towards the end of the Second World War.

== Jewish Leopoldstadt ==
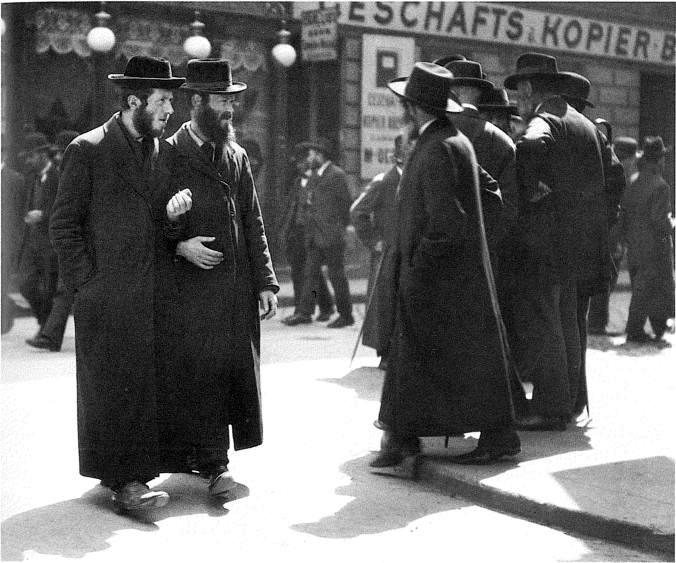
Haredi Jews at the Karmelitermarkt in Leopoldstadt during the Austro-Hungarian Empire, in 1915. The once flourishing Viennese Jewish culture was destroyed during the Holocaust.

In 1625, Rabbi Yom-Tov Lipmann Heller became the rabbi of Vienna. At the time, the Jews of Vienna were scattered throughout the city, not having a central community. Heller obtained for the Jews the right to establish a central Jewish community in Leopoldstadt, which was already then a suburb of Vienna. He was instrumental in reorganizing the community, and he drew up its constitution.

By the mid-17th century, part of the built-up area was the Jewish ghetto. At that time the area was called Im Werd, with the Jewish population living in an area called Unterer Werd. The hatred that Leopold I, Holy Roman Emperor held for the Jews led to the forceful expulsion of the Jewish community in 1670 (Vienna Gesera, from Hebrew: גזרה, 'decree'), with the popular support of the local non-Jewish population. As a thanksgiving for the expulsion, the inhabitants renamed the area Leopoldstadt ('Leopold's city'), after the emperor. During the time of the Austro-Hungarian Empire, Jewish immigrants from eastern parts of the realm again flocked to Leopoldstadt, owing to the proximity of the Nordbahnhof railway station, which was one of the main railway stations at which migrants from other parts of the empire arrived in Vienna. The high number of Jewish inhabitants led to the area being called Mazzesinsel ('Island of Matzo', referring to the unleavened bread eaten during Passover). Several important synagogues were located there, including the Schiff Shul, the Leopoldstädter Tempel, the Türkischer Tempel, the Polnische Schul, and the Pazmanitentempel, as well as yeshivas.

None of the synagogues escaped the destruction during the Kristallnacht pogroms of November 1938 following the annexation of Austria by Nazi Germany. A fragment of a Torah scroll was saved by Heschel Messias from one of the synagogues as it burned. The Jewish population was increasingly isolated and terrorised and was finally deported and exterminated in concentration camps such as Auschwitz. The once thriving communal life was completely destroyed. Only a handful of survivors were able to hide until the end of the war, from an original population of several thousands.

With the fall of the Iron Curtain in 1989, and renewed immigration from Eastern Europe, especially the former Soviet Union, the Jewish population of Leopoldstadt was able to grow again. Today, many members of Vienna's Jewish community live there again, and there are a number of shops and restaurants selling kosher food. Several parts of the old residential areas have been gentrified, resulting in a gentle shift from Leopoldstadt's traditional, predominantly working class roots towards a somewhat wealthier population.

== Transport ==
The U1 metro line runs east to west through central Leopoldstadt, with stops at Nestroyplatz and Praterstern and Vorgartenstrasse. The U2 metro line, opened in May 2008 in time for the European Football Championship, links Leopoldstadt with the northern edge of the city centre and runs south east over the Donaustadtbrücke.

Praterstern railway station provides direct links to Vienna International Airport in the south and Floridsdorf to the north east, and inner city stations Wien Mitte and Wien Hauptbahnhof. The station sits amid a large roundabout, which connects to the A22 Donauufer Autobahn over the Reichsbrücke.

Multiple tram lines service the district, including the terminal of the '1' tram in the Wiener Prater.

== Coat of arms ==
Crest of Leopoldstadt

The arms of the Leopoldstadt district, since the retirement of Brigittenau from the 2nd District, contains three parts, symbolizing the former independent communities:

- Saint Leopold in the upper left part (heraldic: upper right) part, symbolizes the historical Leopoldstadt, the former Lower Werd, the area between Augarten, Taborstraße and the Danube Canal. He is in a blue gown and a red cloak, trimmed with ermine; on his head, he wears the crown of the dukes of Austria. In his hands, he holds the banner of the archduchy of Austria below the Enns, and also a church model that symbolizes the patronage of the parish church.
- The upper right (heraldic: upper left) part of the crest represents the district section Jägerzeile, the area around today's Praterstraße. It shows the stag of St. Hubert in silver on a green meadow. On the head of the stag are 12-point golden antlers, and a golden cross in the middle. As a symbol of the hunt, the stag represents the earlier use of the Prater and the Danube as a hunting area.
- The lower part of the coat of arms stands for the district section of Zwischenbrücken. It shows a red tongue on a blue background, surrounded by a golden halo, which has five gold stars. The emblem symbolizes St. John of Nepomuk, the patron saint of bridges. Before the regulation of the Danube in 1870–75, the area lay between several branches of the Danube and its bridges.

== Arts and culture ==
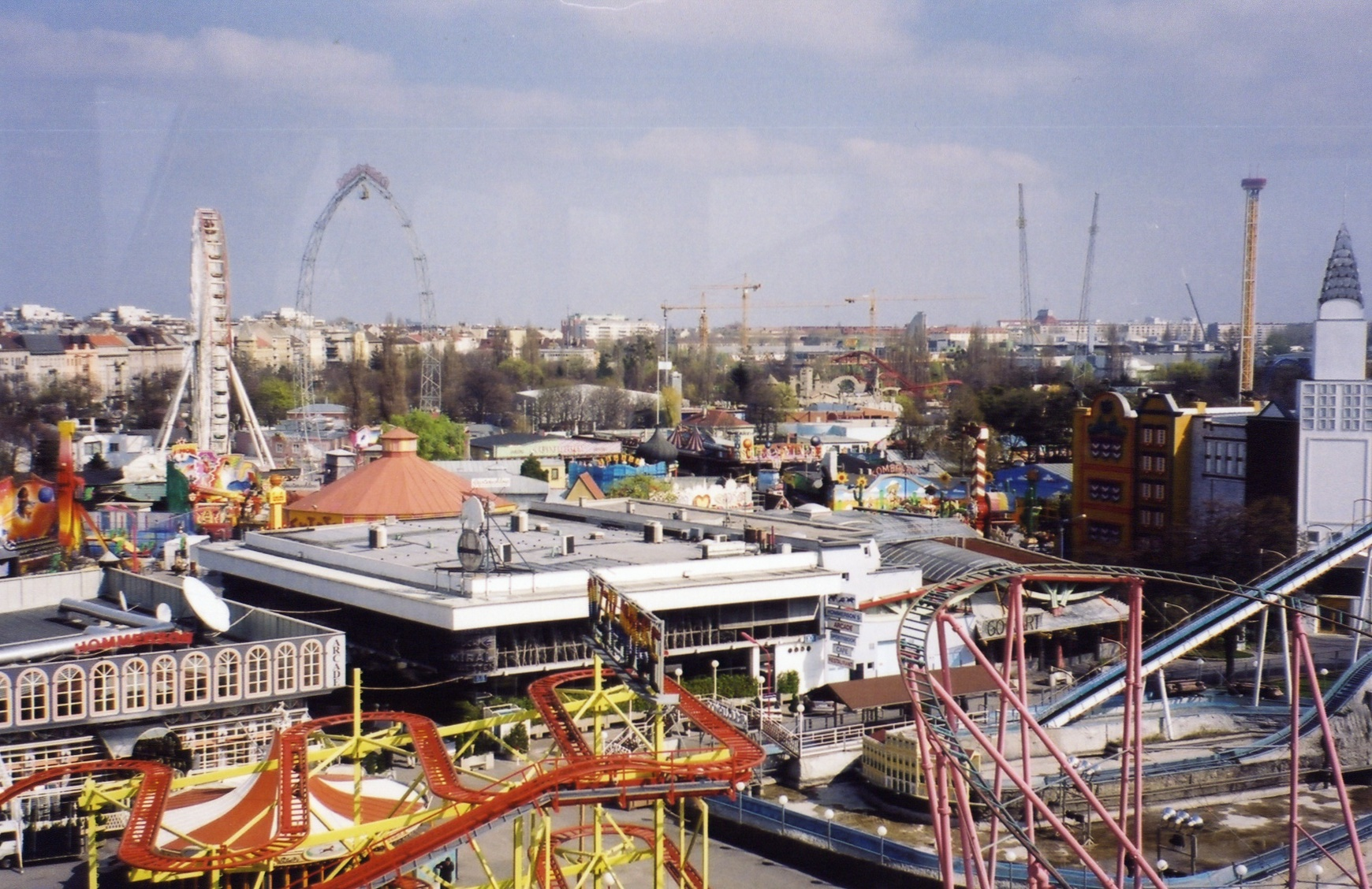
The Volksprater amusement park in the Wiener Prater

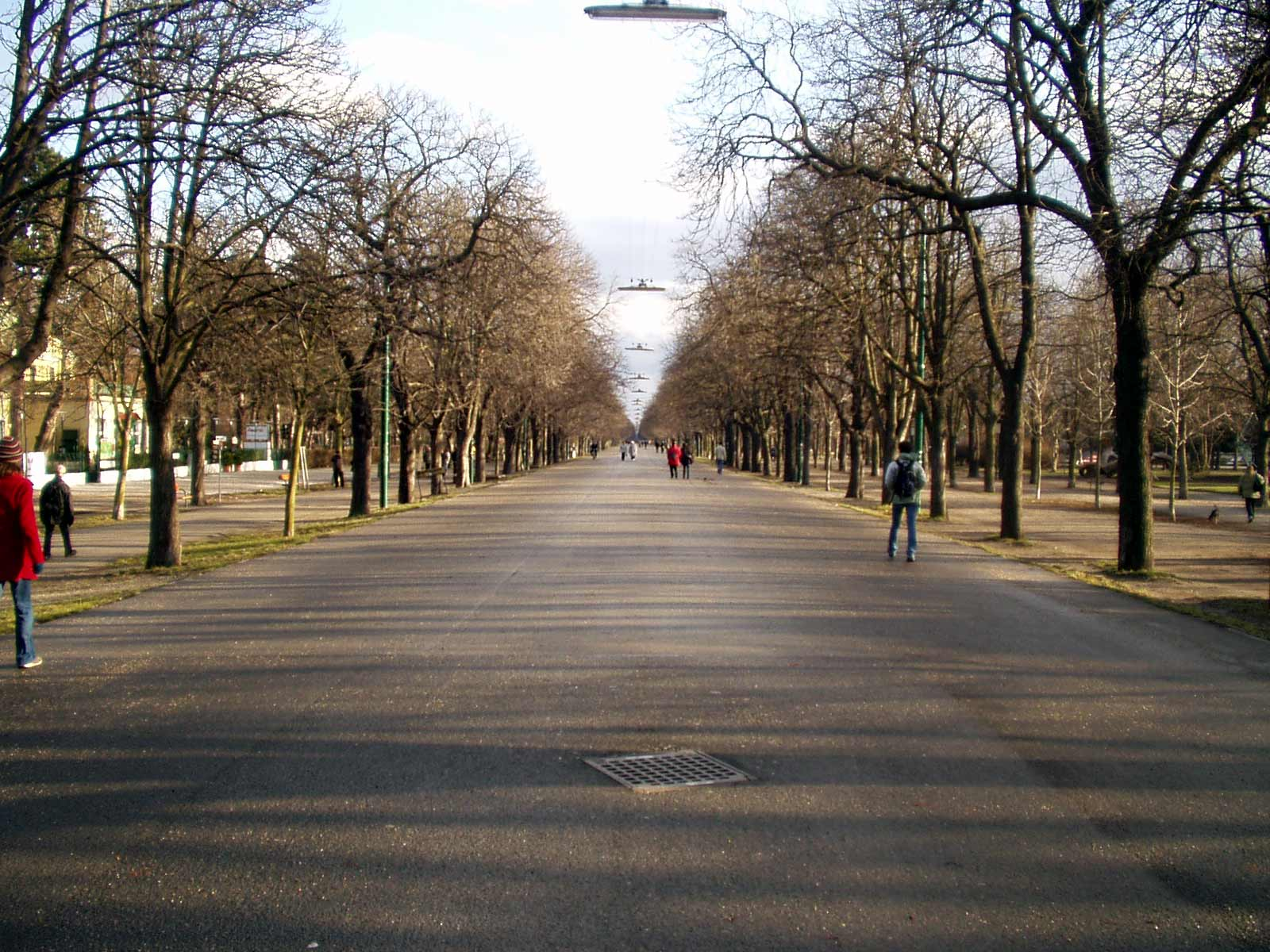
The Hauptallee in the Prater

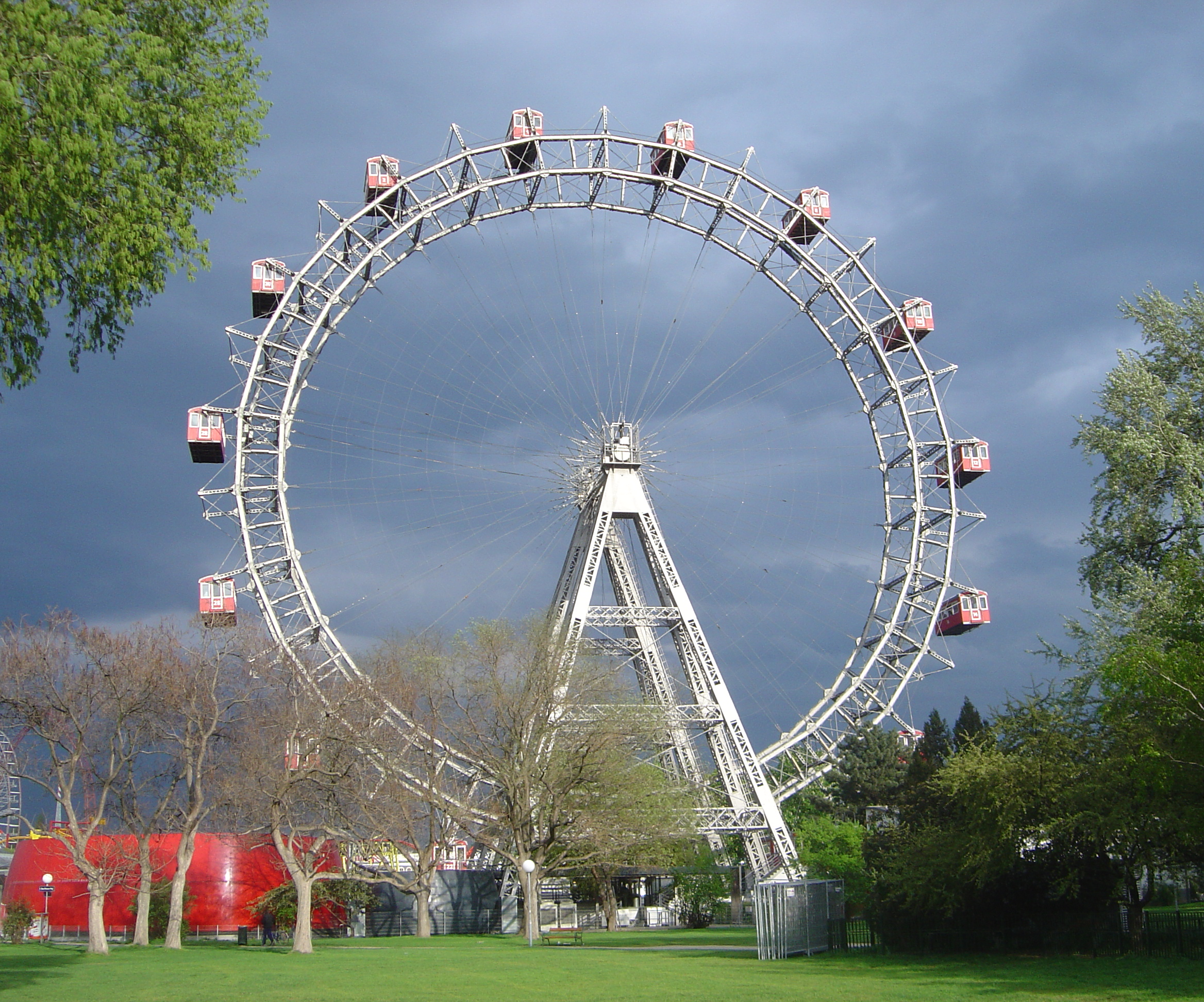
Wiener Riesenrad Ferris wheel

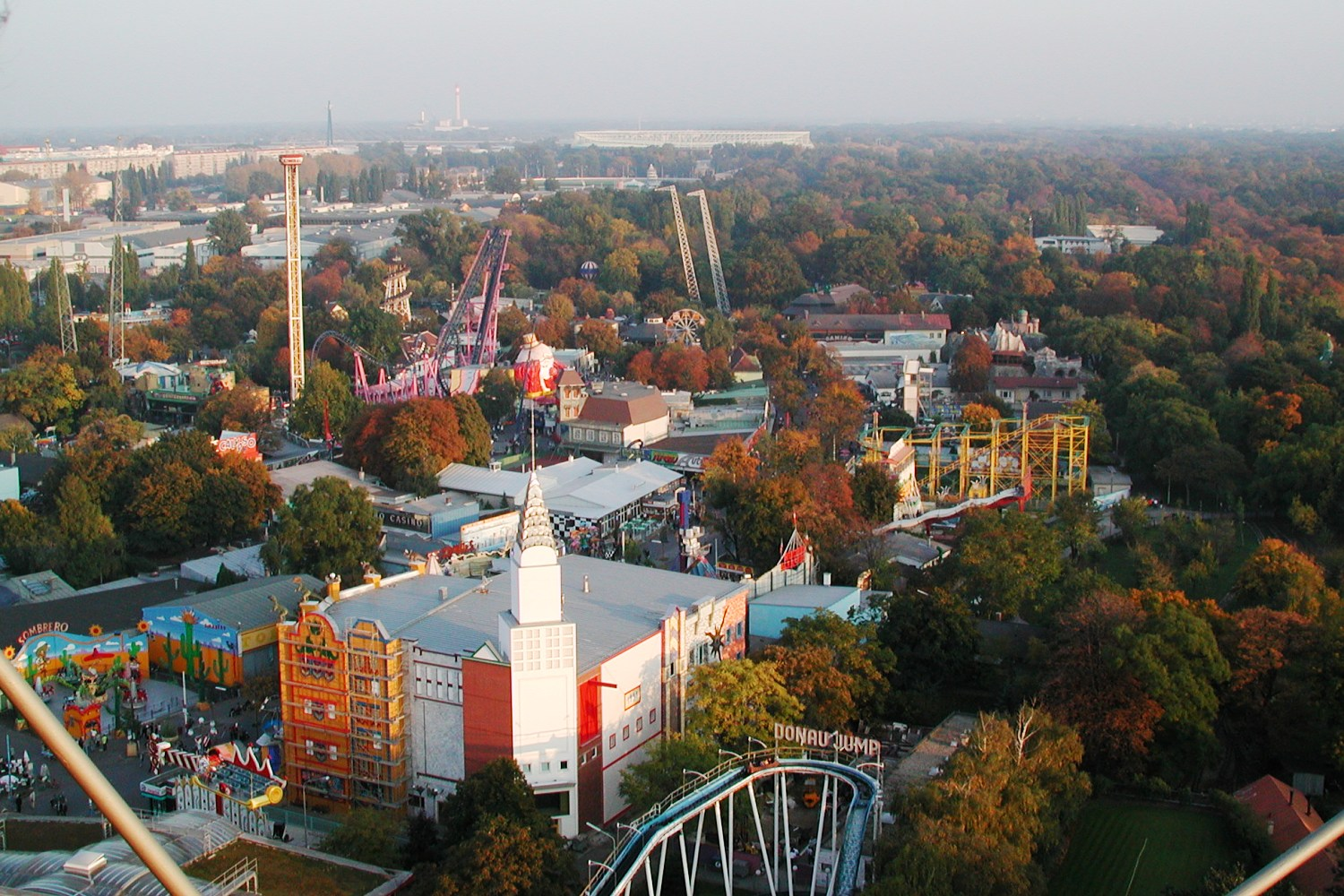
Volksprater, seen from the Ferris wheel

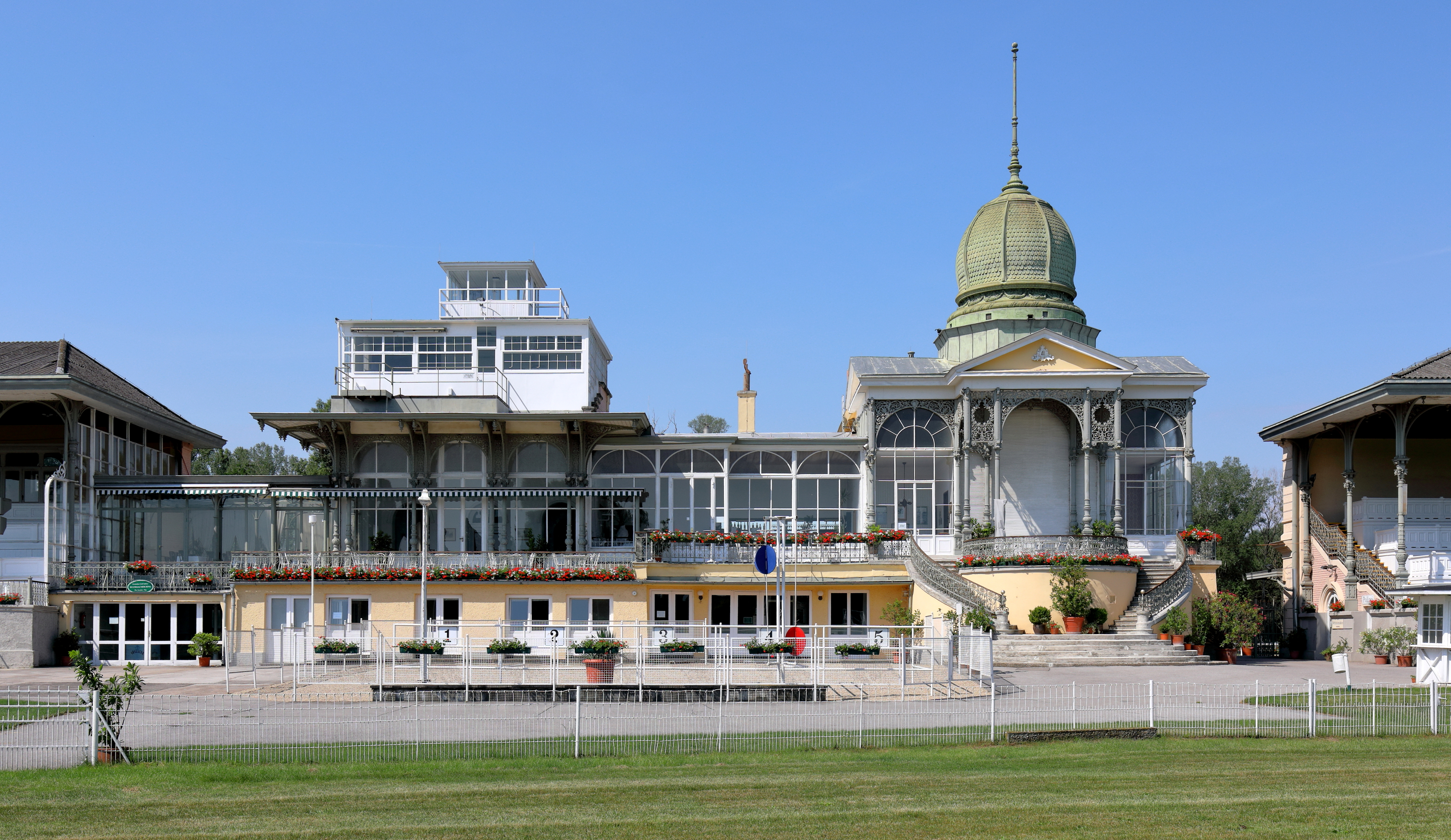
Galopprennplatz Freudenau

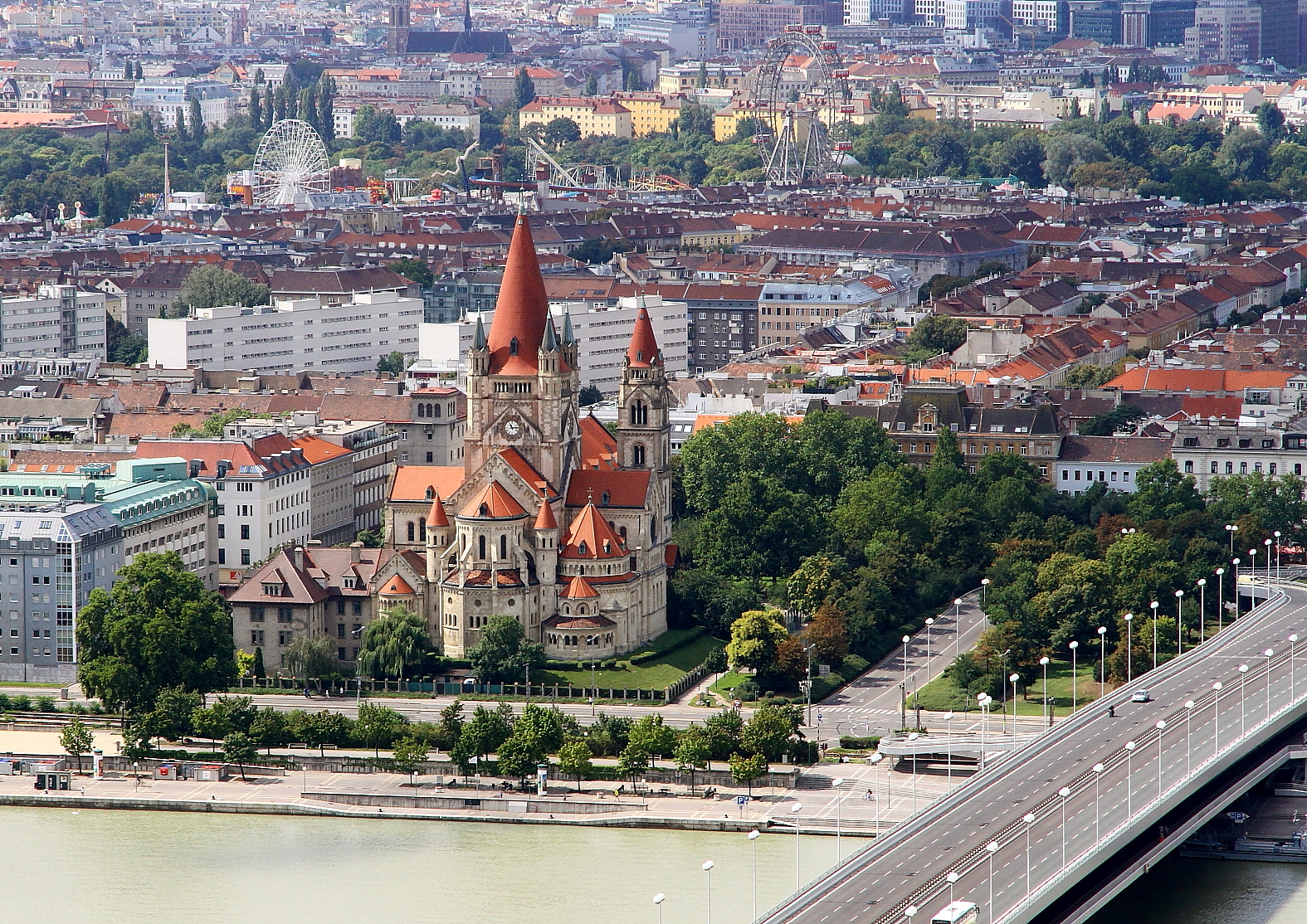
The "Mexico Church"

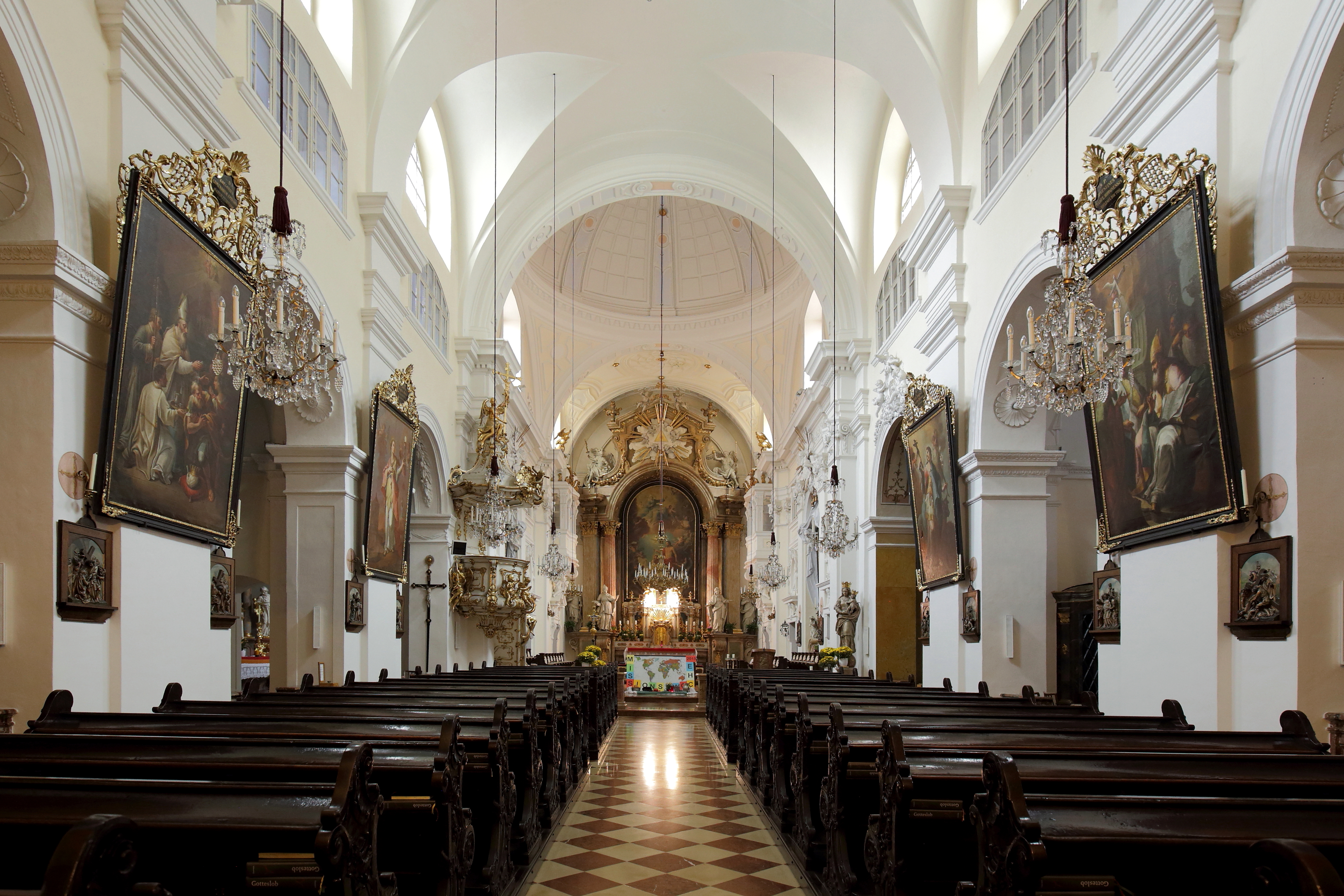
Interior of the Church of the Barmherzigen Brüder Listen to the noon bells.

- Wiener Prater
  - Wiener Riesenrad giant Ferris wheel
  - Lusthaus (Vienna)
  - Prater Liliputbahn
  - Vienna planetarium
  - Prater Museum (Vienna Museum)
- Augarten
  - Porcelain Manufacture Augarten
  - Vienna Boys' Choir (Wiener Sängerknaben)
  - Augarten Contemporary (operated by the Belvedere)
  - Gustinus Ambrosi Museum
- Johann Strauss residence (Vienna Museum)
- Augarten Bridge
- Agricultural products market, today Odeon (see below)
- Leopold Church
- The St. Francis of Assisi Church, Vienna or "Mexico Church"
- Tegetthoff Monument
- Vienna Crime Museum
- District Museum Leopoldstadt

=== Museums ===
The Leopoldstadt Museum has a particular emphasis on the arts. The focus is on, among other things, the Theater in Leopoldstadt, the Carl-Theater, the Leopoldstädter Theater, the Prater, and the Jewish Ghetto. The Museum für Unterhaltungskunst covers the history of clowns, artists, and circuses; whereas the Museum des Blindenwesens in his exhibition shows the development of teaching and lessons for the blind and Braille. The Wiener Kriminalmuseum ("Vienna Crime Museum"), connected with the Museum of the Vienna Federal Police Directorate, brings the visitor closer to the history of the judiciary and the police and of criminality from the late Middle Ages forward.

Two major museums in Vienna have branch offices in Leopoldstadt. The Vienna Museum (formerly the Museum of the City of Vienna) operates the Prater Museum (next to the Ferris wheel) on the history of the Wurstelprater amusement park and also allows visits to the home of the "Waltz King" Johann Strauss the Younger in the Praterstraße. The Belvedere has also two branch offices in the 2nd District: Augarten Contemporary (contemporary art) and the neighboring Gustinus-Ambrosi Museum. The Augarten factory has regular exhibits of porcelain in the foyer of the Palais Augarten.

=== Theater ===
In the great hall of the former Agricultural Products Exchange (Taborstraße 10), the team of Serapions Ensembles to Erwin Piplits and Ulrike Kaufmann with the assistance of the City Council until 1988, created the Odeon, a flexible theater space of considerable proportions. The Serapionsensemble, Neue Oper Wien, and other artists appear here. The name recalls the Odeon dance hall, which was located in the area of today's Odeongasse, behind the Agricultural Exchange. Opened in 1845 and destroyed by fire in 1848, it was the largest dance hall in Vienna at that time, with room for several thousand persons.

=== Outdoor cinema and former cinemas ===
As a traditional theater district, Leopoldstadt had, in the middle of the 20th century, numerous cinemas. As a result of the spread of television in Austria from the late 1950s, cinemas began to close in the 1960s, by which the 2nd District was severely affected. By and by, Leopold townspeople cinemas were closed, and now there is no single regular cinema in the district area. Even the UCI opened in 1999, at the Mehrsälekino Lassallestraße, was already closed three years later because of poor attendance.

The former cinemas, in the order of closure, are:

- Stern (Rotensterngasse 7a), −1962
- Adria (Am Tabor 22), −1964
- Diana (Praterstraße 25), −1968
- Luna (Taborstraße 69), −1971
- Planetarium Studio 2 (Oswald Thomas Platz 1, at the Planetarium), −1972
- Augarten (Malzgasse 2), −1973
- Nestroy (Nestroyplatz, im Nestroyhof), −1975
- Wohlmuth (Wohlmuthstraße 15–17), −1979
- Filmpalast (Prater, near Wiener Riesenrad), −1981 (abgebrannt); aka Lustspieltheater, Lustspielkino, Leopoldstädter Volkskino und Tegethoff
- Helios (Taborstraße 36), −1983
- Münstedt Kino Palast (Prater), −1984
- Panorama Center 1–3 (Praterstern, in Schnellbahnviadukt), −1993; first Mehrsälekino of Vienna.
- Tabor (Taborstraße 8), −1996
- Prater Nonstop (Prater), −1997; Sexkino
- UCI (Lassallestraße 7a), −2002; 1999 opened as Mehrsälekino

This development is however an increasing demand for outdoor summer cinema, since the early 1990s, before the Vienna City Hall every summer, the Film Festival at the Vienna City Hall Square takes place. In the 2nd District, there are currently four summer open-air cinemas:

- Kino unter Sternen ("Cinema under the stars") – Augarten, beim Flakturm
- Kino wie noch nie ("Cinema as never before") – Augartenspitz, Obere Augartenstraße 1
- Prater Film Festival (Kaiserweise, before the Wiener Riesenrad)
- Sommerkino Tribüne Krieau ("Summer movie gallery") – Trabrennplatz Krieau

In Augarten (Obere Augartenstraße 1), the Austrian film archive established here and at the Metro Cinema (1st district) shows historical films and scientific research.

== District partnership ==
In the year 2007, Brooklyn, New York City entered into a district partnership with the Viennese district of Leopoldstadt.

== Notable residents ==
- Ute Bock
- Heidemarie Cammerlander (1942–), member of the Municipal Council and Landtag of Vienna
- Elias Canetti (1905–1994), writer
- Otto Erich Deutsch (1883–1967), musicologist
- Carl Djerassi
- Andrea Maria Dusl, writer and filmmaker
- Bernd Fasching
- Viktor Frankl (1905–1997), neurologist and psychiatrist, Holocaust survivor
- Sigmund Freud, psychoanalyst
- Bernhard Gál, artist, composer
- Karl Goldmark (1830–1915), composer
- Theodor Herzl
- Rudolf Hilferding
- Ludwig Hirsch (1946–2011), songwriter and actor
- Hans König (1947–), politician and writer (SPÖ)
- Henry Koerner (1915–1991), painter and graphic designer
- Theodor Kramer (1897–1958), Austrian poet
- Fritz Kreisler (1875–1962)
- Marie Langer, psychoanalyst
- Emil Mayer, (1871–1938), photographer and inventor
- Lise Meitner, scientist
- Robert Menasse (1954–), writer
- Johann Nestroy
- Richard Neutra (1892–1970), architect
- Alfred Polgar (1873–1955), columnist, drama critic, writer and translator
- Michoel Pressburger, rabbi
- Heinrich Rauchinger (1858–1942), painter
- Arthur Schnitzler
- Arnold Schoenberg, composer
- Jura Soyfer
- Max Steiner, film composer
- Ursula Stenzel
- Johann Strauss I, composer
- Johann Strauss II, composer
- Hannes Swoboda (1946–), politician (SPÖ)
- Billy Wilder (1906–2002), American film director and producer
- Alexander von Zemlinsky, composer

== See also ==
- History of the Jews in Austria
