= Ferenc Forgách (archbishop of Esztergom) =

Hungarian Roman Catholic Cardinal

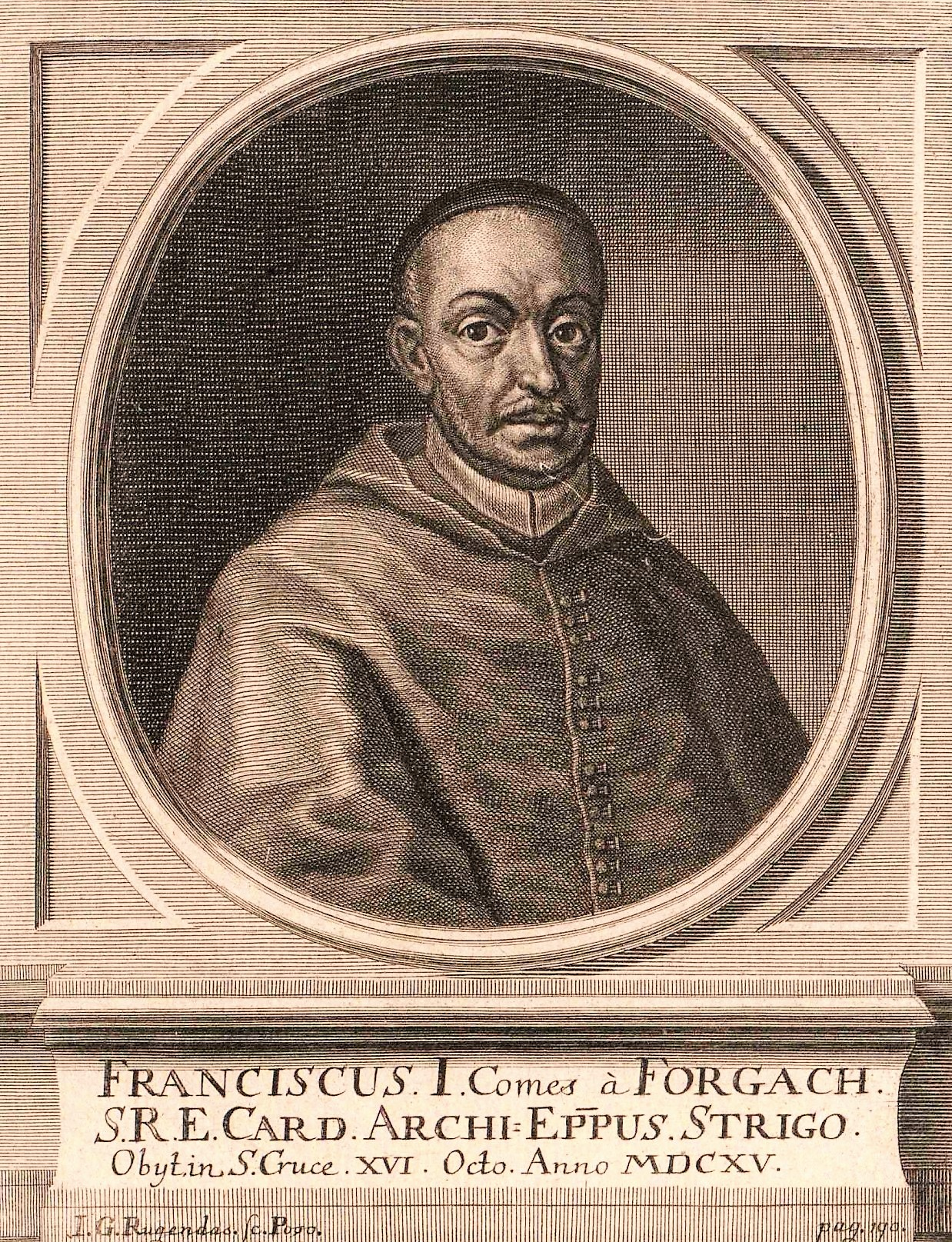
- Archdiocese: Esztergom
- Installed: 4 July 1607
- Term ended: 16 October 1615
- Predecessor: János Kutassy
- Successor: Péter Pázmány
- Other posts: Bishop of Veszprém; Bishop of Nyitra; Chancellor of Hungary

Personal details
- Born: 1560 Szentkereszt, Kingdom of Hungary (today: Sklené Teplice, Slovakia)
- Died: 16 October 1615 (aged 54–55) Garamszentkereszt, Kingdom of Hungary (today: Žiar nad Hronom, Slovakia)
- Denomination: Catholic
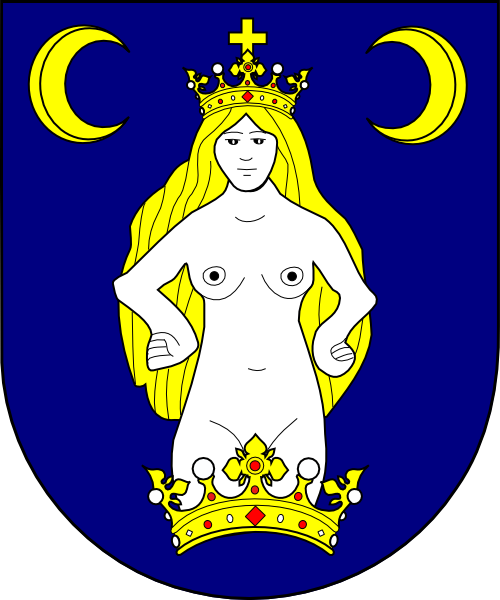
- Coat of arms

Baron Ferenc Forgách de Ghymes et Gács (1560 – 16 October 1615) was a Hungarian Cardinal of the Roman Catholic Church, who served as archbishop of Esztergom from 1607 to 1615.

== Family ==
The Forgách family was one of the eldest houses of Hungary. Ferenc's parents were Baron Simon Forgách (died 1598) and Orsolya Pemflinger. His father functioned as Master of Cup-bearers. They had ten children (five boys and five girls), including Zsigmond Forgách, Palatine, and Mihály Forgách, a soldier.

Ferenc Forgách was born as a Lutheran. He converted to Roman Catholicism under the influence of his uncle, Ferenc Forgách, who functioned as Bishop of Várad (today: Oradea).

== Bibliography ==
- Markó, László: A magyar állam főméltóságai Szent Istvántól napjainkig - Életrajzi Lexikon p. 225. (The High Officers of the Hungarian State from Saint Stephen to the Present Days - A Biographical Encyclopedia) (2nd edition); Helikon Kiadó Kft., 2006, Budapest; ISBN 963-547-085-1.
- Szabó de Bártfa, László: A Hunt-Pázmán nemzetségbeli Forgách család története History of the Forgách family from the kindred of Hont-Pázmány; 1910, Esztergom.
- Ackermann, Kálmán: Forgách Ferenc bíboros, esztergomi érsek. Budapest, 1918.

Catholic Church titles
Preceded by János Kutassy	Archbishop of Esztergom; July 4, 1607 – October 16, 1615	Succeeded by Péter Pázmány
