= Pazmanitentempel =

Synagogue in Leopoldstadt, Vienna, Austria

- German: Synagoge in der Leopoldstadt
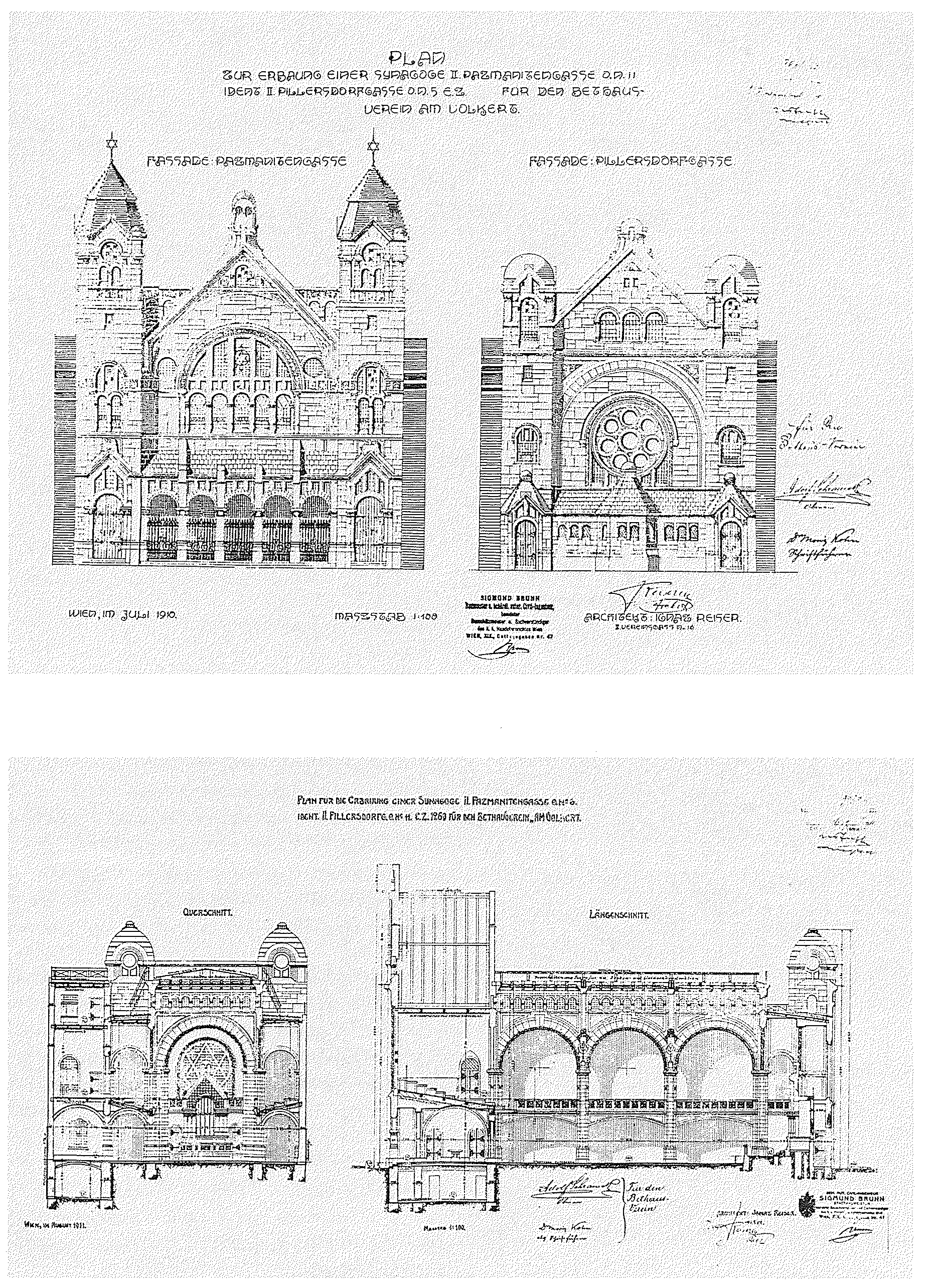
- Plans of the former synagogue, by Ignaz Reiser

- Location of the former synagogue in Austria

Religion
- Affiliation: Judaism (former)
- Ecclesiastical or organizational status: Synagogue (1913–1938)
- Status: Destroyed

Location
- Location: Pazmanitengasse 6, Leopoldstadt, Vienna
- Country: Austria
- Interactive map of Pazmanitentempel
- Coordinates: 48°13′14″N 16°23′05″E

Architecture
- Architect: Ignaz Reiser
- Type: Synagogue architecture
- Funded by: Adolf Schramek
- Established: 1875 (as a congregation)
- Completed: 1913
- Destroyed: 9–10 November 1938 on Kristallnacht

The Pazmanitentempel, also known as the Jubiläumstempel (German: Synagoge in der Leopoldstadt), was a Jewish synagogue, located at Pazmanitengasse 6, Leopoldstadt, in the 2nd district of Vienna, Austria. Completed in 1913, the synagogue was destroyed on Kristallnacht in 1938.

== History ==
The congregation was established in 1875 as the Association Aeschel Awrachom, also known as German: Am Volker.

The synagogue was designed and constructed by the architect Ignaz Reiser and dedicated on 28 September 1913. It was built to commemorate the 80th birthday of Franz Joseph I. The building was financed by Adolf Schramek (1845–1915) who signed the contract with the builder in 1910. Originally from Leipnik, Moravia, Schramek became one of Vienna's most successful coal merchants.

The Pazmaniten synagogue was, therefore, not built by the Kultusgemeinde but by a temple club (Verein) Am Volkert, or Aeschel Awrachom (Tent of Abraham) of which Schramek was the president. Plans and photographs of the virtual reconstruction of the synagogue are illustrated in The Destroyed Synagogues of Vienna.

The former synagogue was once described as the most beautiful in Vienna. It was destroyed during the Nazi pogroms of the Kristallnacht after the Anschluss of Austria to Nazi Germany in 1938.

== See also ==
- History of the Jews in Vienna
