= Heidemarie Cammerlander =

Austrian politician (born 1942)

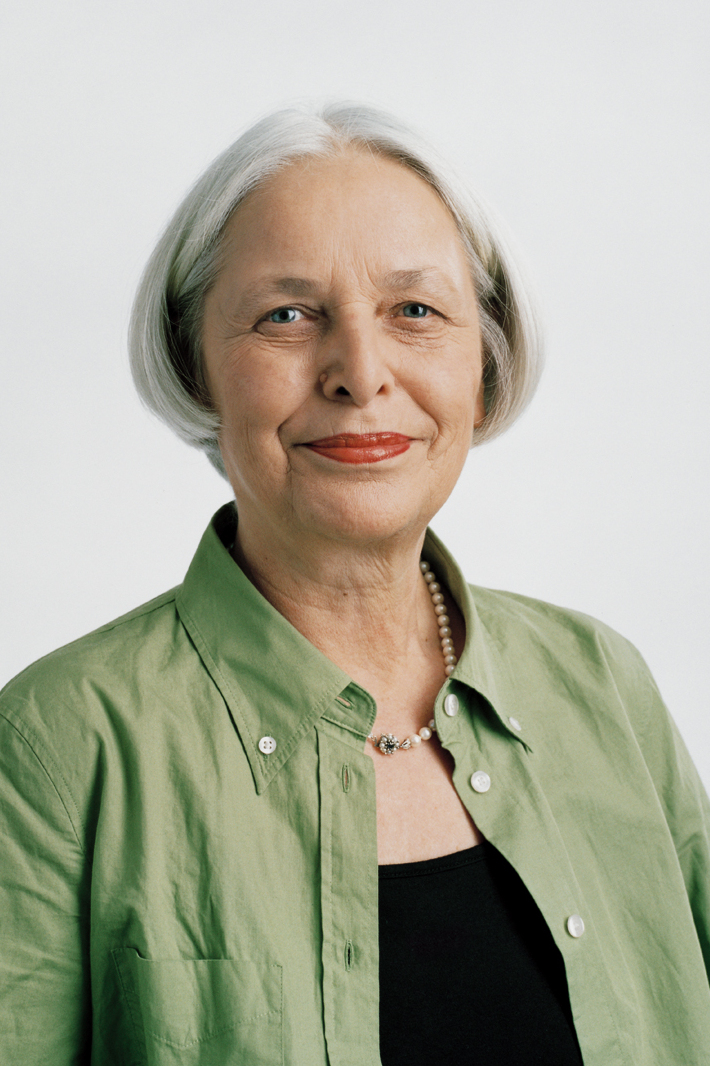

Member of the Municipal Council and Landtag of Vienna for Leopoldstadt
- In office 18 November 2005 – 25 November 2010

Personal details
- Born: 26 September 1942 (age 83) Innsbruck, Nazi Germany
- Party: The Greens

Heidemarie "Heidi" Cammerlander (born 26 September 1942) is an Austrian social worker and politician who served in the Municipal Council and Landtag of Vienna from 2005 until 2010, representing Leopoldstadt. A member of The Greens, she advocated for measures against drug and gambling addiction, including the establishment of safe consumption rooms and the banning of all low-cost slot machines in Vienna.

== Biography ==
Heidemarie Cammerlander was born on 26 September 1942 in Innsbruck, Austria (then part of Nazi Germany). After completing secondary school, she attended a commercial school (Handelsschule). Cammerlander worked as a manager and director for several social projects, including a program which provided aid for released prisoners; she also worked with a development cooperation firm in Guatemala.

A member of The Greens, Cammerlander represented the party in the district councils of Landstraße and Leopoldstadt in Vienna. In the 2005 Viennese state election, she was one of fourteen Greens elected to the Municipal Council and Landtag of Vienna, representing Leopoldstadt. Prior to her election, she was also an office manager for the Vienna Greens, and was the chairwoman of the local Green Education Workshop (Grüne Bildungswerkstatt). While in the Landtag, Cammerlander was a member of the committees on migration and human rights, and was the social policy spokesman for the Vienna Greens.

During her tenure, Cammerlander advocated for measures against drug and gambling addictions. She supported shifting drug policy to focus on "prevention, harm reduction and treatment", and promoted the establishment of safe consumption rooms at the U-Bahn station in Karlsplatz, which had a large concentration of drug users. She also criticized a renovation plan at the station, arguing that "turning Karlsplatz Passage into a glass case is not going to make drug addiction and alcoholism disappear". Additionally, Cammerlander introduced a bill which would have banned small-scale gambling in Vienna, citing an increase in gambling addiction, particularly among minors. The bill targeted 2,000 "low-stakes" slot machines, which provided over 34 million euros in tax revenue for the city government per year; she argued that the low cost of the machines, which were capped by law at a maximum of fifty cents per game, made them much more attractive to minors. She left office at the end of her term on 25 November 2010.
