= Schweizerhaus =

Restaurant in Vienna, Austria

Coordinates: 48°12′50″N 16°24′04″E

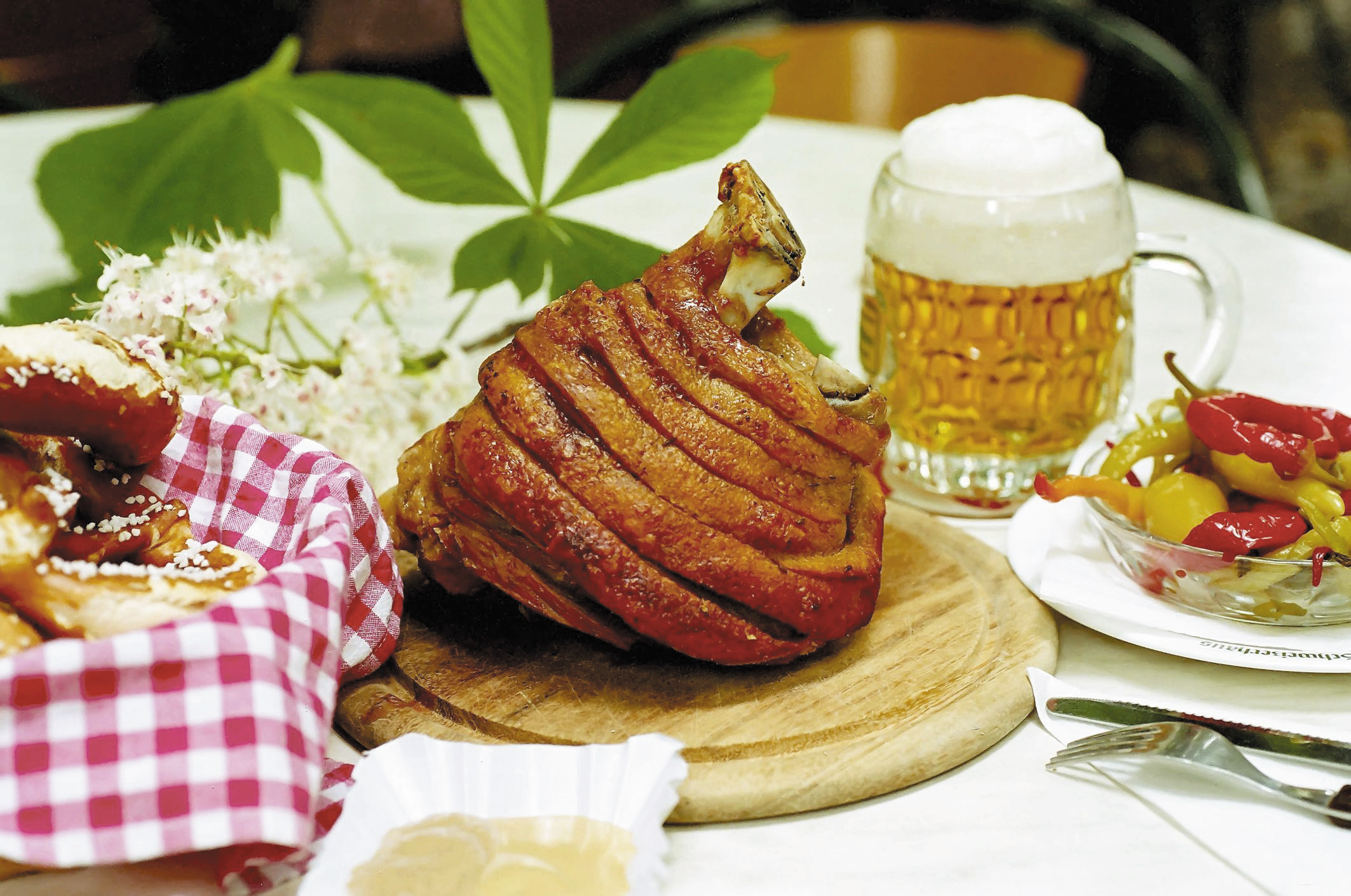
Roast pork knuckle

The Schweizerhaus (literally "Swiss house") is a Viennese restaurant, rich in tradition, that is inseparably linked with the Prater, a large public area and park in Leopoldstadt, the second district of Vienna, Austria's capital.

== Beer garden ==
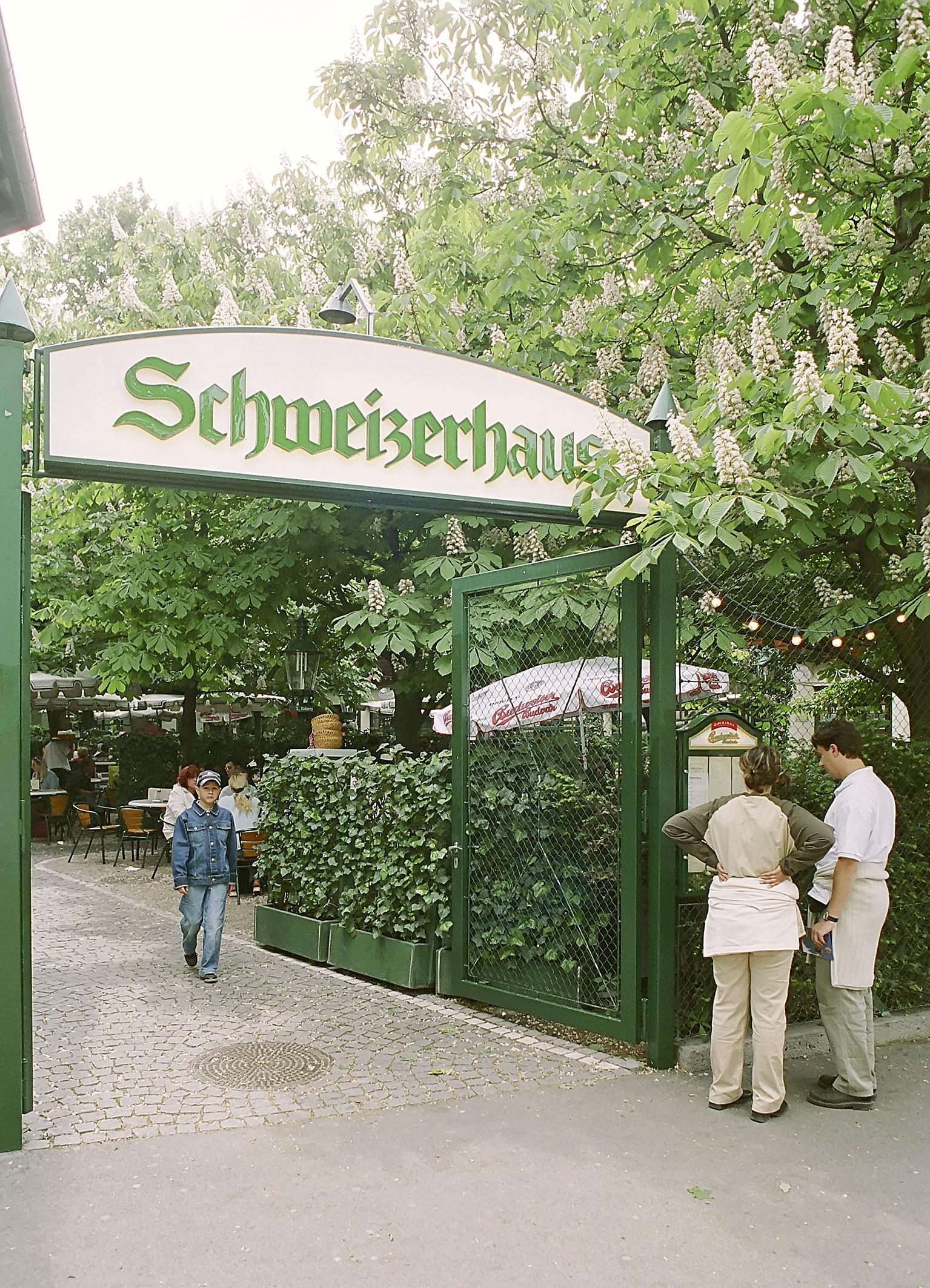
Entry to the Schweizerhaus

The restaurant has a huge beer garden which is subdivided into smaller areas, each of which is named accordingly to a town district of Vienna (itself being situated in Leopoldstadt, the 2nd of 23), with the bar being an exception. Its name Franz-Josef-Bahnhof (railway station) is taken from the Vienna train station of the same name. There are also two areas named for Vienna city sectors: Oberlaa and Kaisermühlen, so called independent regions. This arrangement is meant, above all, for easier orientation within the garden, and the various geographical reference points serve as an aid for the crew.

Besides the classic Viennese culinary specialties, such as goulash and Wiener Schnitzel, the trademark dish of the restaurant is Schweinsstelzen (pig shanks). Another specialty is Budweiser Budvar beer, a popular beer brand from the Czech Republic, served fresh from the tap. The Schweizerhaus is open from March 15 until October 31.

== History ==
The name Schweizerhaus is derived from a Schweizer Meierei (Swiss dairy) that was opened in the Prater in 1868. It supposedly already existed in 1766 as the Schweizer Hütte (Swiss lodge) in the Prater, which was not yet a public park at this time. In 1814 it was reputedly renamed Zum russischen Kaiser (Russian Tsar). From 1907 to 1920, there was already a restaurant at the present location of the Schweizerhaus. It was operated by a host named Jan Gabriel before Karl Kolarik took it over and made it into a family business.

The term Schweiz (Switzerland) in the name of the restaurant has little or nothing to do with Switzerland, and is not even due to an original Swiss owner. Rather, the name came about because, in the time of the emperors, Switzerland had been, for centuries, associated with opulence and sophisticated gastronomy.

=== Fire in the Schweizerhaus ===
On the night of the 10th and 11 June 2005, a fire broke out in the Schweizerhaus . According to police reports, it was a case of arson by a yet unknown person.

== See also ==
- List of restaurants in Vienna
