= Wiener Looping =

Steel roller coaster at Wiener Prater

Wurstelprater
- Location: Wurstelprater
- Park section: Plots 34, 35, 143, 143a, 144, and 144a of Wiener Prater
- Coordinates: 48.216458°N 16.401085°E
- Status: Operating
- Opening date: May 23 2025
- Replaced: Bachsteinhalle

General statistics
- Type: Steel
- Manufacturer: Mack Rides
- Designer: Julian Omonsky
- Model: BigDipper
- Lift/launch system: Lift hill
- Height: 101.7 ft (31.0 m)
- Length: 1,699.5 ft (518.0 m)
- Speed: 50.3 mph (81.0 km/h)
- Inversions: 3
- Max vertical angle: 92°
- G-force: 4.2
- Height restriction: 130 cm (4 ft 3 in)
- Trains: 2 trains with a single car; riders arranged 4 across in 2 rows for a total of 8 riders per train
- Wiener Looping at RCDB

Wiener Looping is a steel roller coaster at Wurstelprater (located within Wiener Prater) in Leopoldstadt, Vienna, Austria. Built by Mack Rides, the coaster spans multiple sections of the amusement park and is one of its few attractions operated by owner Stefan Sittler-Koidl.

Wiener Looping was first announced in 2021 but was marred by several construction setbacks, most notably the unauthorized demolition of a nightclub and its associated legal injunction. The coaster opened on May 23 2025.

== History ==
=== Background ===
Wiener Prater has typically consisted of several independent operators running most of the park's attractions, with only a couple owned by the park itself. Prater president Stefan Sittler-Koidl described it as a childhood dream to eventually build and operate his own roller coaster.

Planning for the new attraction first began as early as 2019. In June 2021, Sittler-Koidl first spoke of the new "Vienna Looping” coaster, promised to span several plots of land and become the largest permanent roller coaster in Austria. Depending on approvals, construction was earmarked to have begun that September and have the coaster opened in early 2022.

Although progress had not been made by that time, ride designer Julian Omonsky instead teased the involvement of Mack Rides in January 2022. Further reports emerged soon after claiming that the coaster would be the company's customized BigDipper model and occupy land next to Megablitz and the Ghost Train, with a 2023 debut targeted. The first pieces of concept artwork were released in December 2022, with work slated to begin in the next year.

=== Kantine Demolition and Legal Case ===
Construction of Wiener Looping would require the demolition of the former Bachsteinhalle building on Plot 34, which had sat vacant for years and formerly housed a Novomatic Casino, coffee shop, and warehouse. Prior to the building's planned demolishment, it was set to temporarily host the Kantine nightclub from October 2022 until November. The Kantine's tenants disagreed with Prater on their move-out date and filed an injunction; in response, on January 7, 2023, Sittler-Koidl himself operated an excavator and illegally demolished part of the building. Motion sensors and surveillance notified Kantine director Anna Jurjans of a break-in; upon arriving, she found the building partially torn down and notified the police. The construction firm contracted for its demolition confirmed that they'd had no involvement in the incident, and Sittler-Koidl admitted to carrying out the illegal work himself, frustrated that Wiener Looping's construction was two months behind schedule.

The Kantine's owners claimed about €250,000 in damages and negotiated with Prater for a settlement. Despite ride hardware beginning to arrive onsite, the injunction remained in place and forced construction to be postponed by another year. Sittler-Koidl later spoke to the EuroAmusement Professional magazine of an attempted sale of Wiener Looping; it had been placed on the market in July and attracted an interested buyer, but the project ultimately stayed at Wiener Prater.

=== Announcement and Construction ===
Wiener Looping track was first stored at the Hafen Wien harbor in May 2023, and Prater soon installed the first support columns within the site's neighboring Ghost Train building. Demolition of the Bachsteinhalle was able to resume by February 2024. The first track piece was delivered to the construction site on March 20, 2024, as a part of a press event, in which Wiener Prater officially announced the new coaster. Animation and statistics of Wiener Looping were released at this time, along with an expected September 2024 debut; due to delays however with station building planning, assembly of the main coaster structure didn't begin until late October. The highest piece of track was lifted into place on December 4, 2024 using a 450-ton crane, while the final piece was installed on December 18.

== Ride experience ==
Departing the station, riders will make a left hand turn into the lift hill, ascending overtop a guest pathway to a peak height of 101.7 feet (31.0 m) at a speed of 4 m/s (13 ft/s). At the top, the train makes a slow 180° turn to the left before descending a 92° drop. An airtime hill carries the train back over the pathway before plummeting into a trench and two successive inversions; a Banana Roll and elongated vertical loop, offering a brief stall while upside down. The car follows up into a sharply ascending right turn only to exit into a dive loop/drop. Riders navigate a counterclockwise helix and airtime hill before making a final turnaround to the lift in the brake run.

== Characteristics ==
=== Statistics ===
Wiener Looping will be 101.7 feet (31.0 m) tall, 1,699.5 feet (518.0 m) long, and reach a top speed of 50.3 mph (81.0 km/h) throughout the ride. The coaster will run with two single-car trains, each of which will seat eight riders in two rows of four.

=== Etymology ===
The coaster was named after the original Wiener Looping, a modified Anton Schwarzkopf Shuttle Loop designed to be portable and fit within a tight plot of land at Wiener Prater. First set up in 1982, the coaster never opened to the public due to noise complaints from local residents, and was quickly taken down. The coaster was sold off and through its lifetime has operated at and/or with Boardwalk and Baseball, German fairground operator Goetzke, Flamingo Land Resort, and most recently and currently at Selva Mágica.
