= Wurstelprater =

Amusement park in Vienna, Austria

Prater
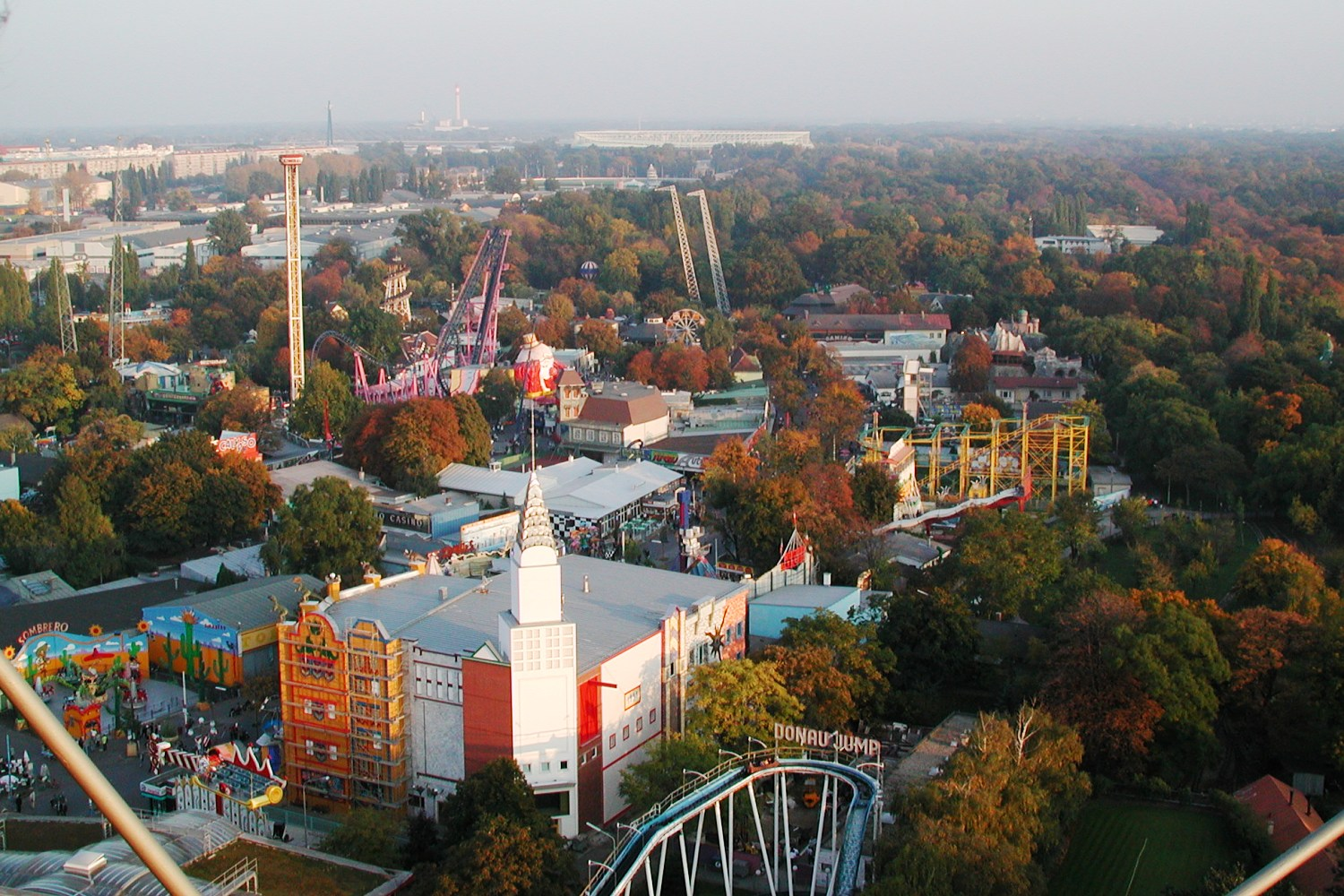

- Location within Vienna
- Location: Vienna, Austria
- Coordinates: 48°12′58″N 16°23′44″E
- Opened: 1895
- Owner: City of Vienna
- Attendance: 6,6 million (2019)
- Area: 64 acres (26 ha)

Attractions
- Total: over 200
- Website: www.praterwien.com/en/

The Wurstelprater, often simply known as the Prater, is an amusement park located in Vienna, Austria, established in 1895. Situated south-east of the city centre within the larger Prater, a park in the district of Leopoldstadt, it is home to the iconic Riesenrad, one of Vienna's most recognisable landmarks.

== History ==
The Wurstelprater derives its name from Hanswurst, a character in traditional folk theatre created by Austrian actor Josef Anton Stranitzky. During the Age of Enlightenment in the late 18th century, these popular theatrical performances were displaced from the marketplaces of what is now the historic city center. They found new venues within the Prater, which had been opened to the public by Emperor Joseph II in 1766. Businesses, including coffee houses and inns, settled in the area, followed by early amusement attractions such as swings, carousels, and bowling alleys.

In 1780–1781, Emperor Joseph II ordered the redesign of the Prater's entrance. A large square was created, later known as the Praterstern, making the Prater accessible at all hours.

By 1782, 47 establishments, known as Praterhütten ("Prater huts"), were recorded in the Wurstelprater, including 43 inns and two carousels. By 1873, the number had increased to 187. On 6 July 1791, Jean-Pierre Blanchard undertook his first hot air balloon flight in Vienna from the Prater, landing in Groß-Enzersdorf.

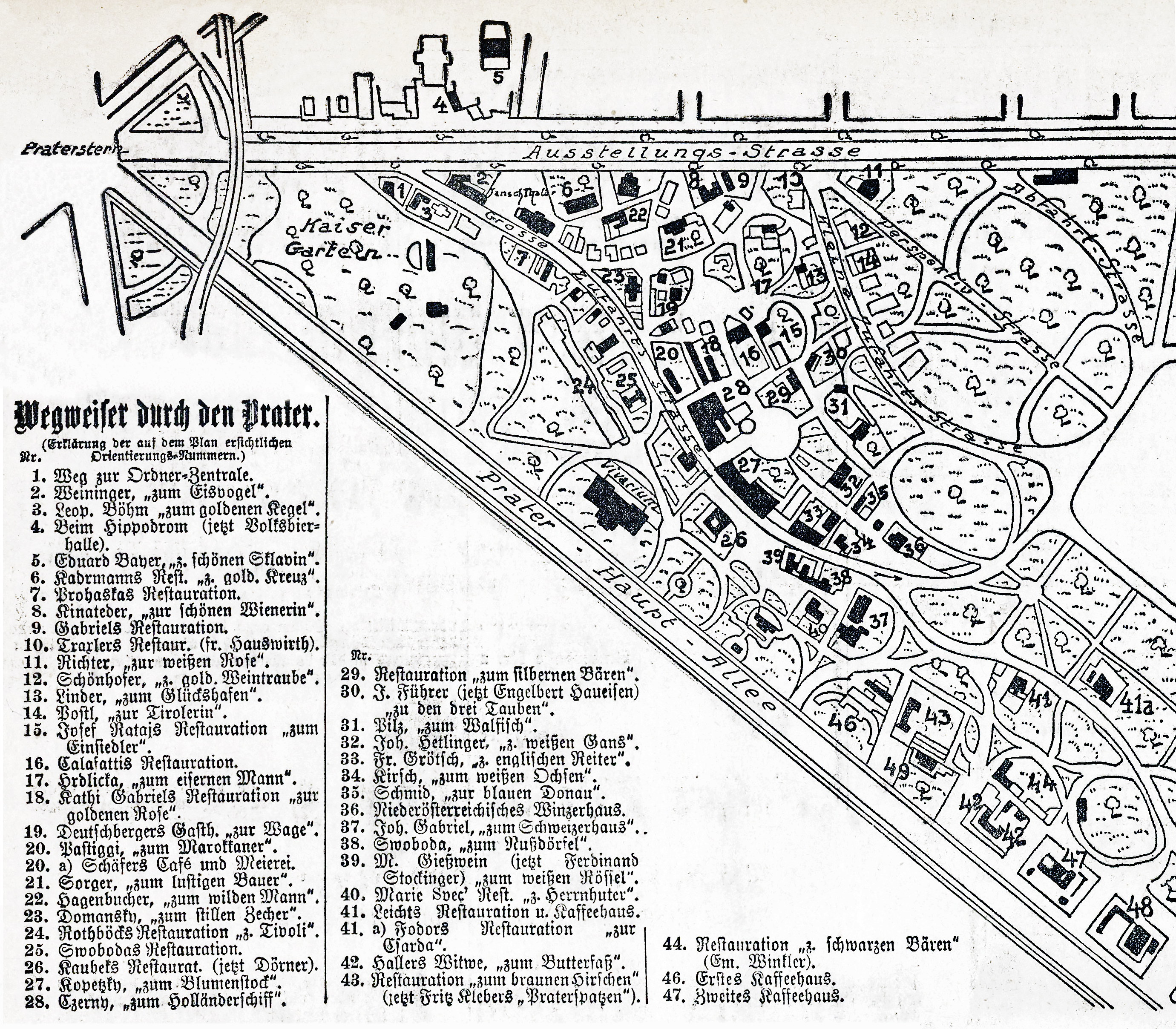
The Prater in 1914

In 1895, the amusement complex Venedig in Wien ("Venice in Vienna") was established. Two years later, in 1897, the Wiener Riesenrad, one of the city's most iconic landmarks, was constructed at its center, along with a roller coaster, an autodrome, and numerous circus attractions. Over time, the Prater evolved into a major center of culture and entertainment. For children, several puppet theaters were set up in simple wooden booths, with Hanswurst playing a central role.

The park suffered extensive destruction in April 1945 during the Vienna offensive. It was rebuilt in the following years, albeit on a smaller scale.

In autumn 1948, significant portions of The Third Man were filmed in the Prater.

In connection with the UEFA Euro 2008 (the Ernst Happel Stadium, one of the tournament venues, is located in the Prater), the Wurstelprater was given a redesigned entrance area called Riesenradplatz, named after the Riesenrad. Designed by Emmanuel Mongon, the entrance area featured a circular layout and was surrounded by restaurants, information booths, and shops arranged in the style of Vienna around 1900. At the edge of the square, the Praterdome, at the time Austria's largest nightclub, was opened in late 2008.

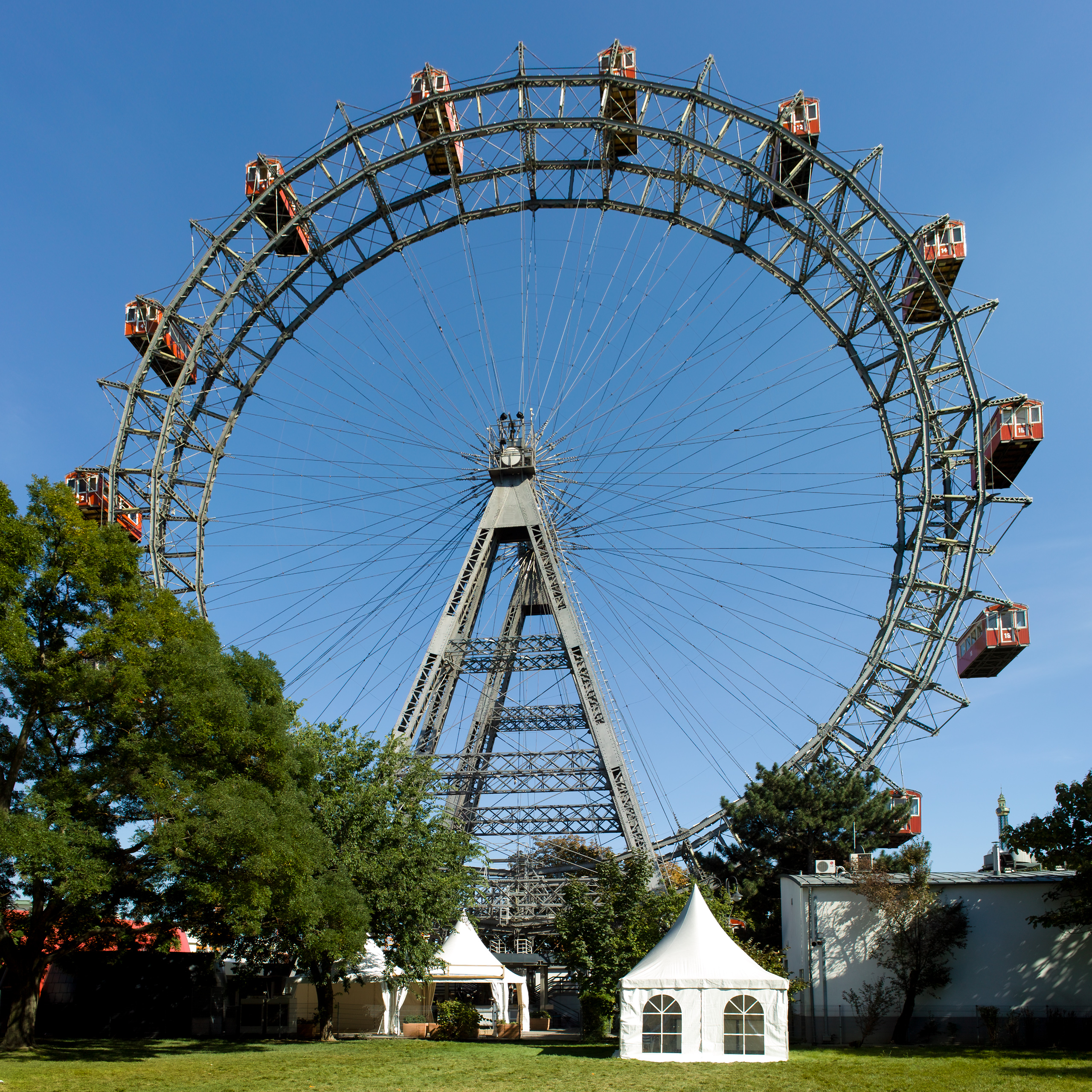
The Riesenrad

== Today ==
Unlike many other amusement parks, entry to the Prater grounds is free; visitors pay individually for each attraction. While the Wurstelprater has a shared marketing structure, the individual plots of land are leased by the City of Vienna to private operators, who run their businesses at their own risk. The main season runs from mid-March to the end of October.

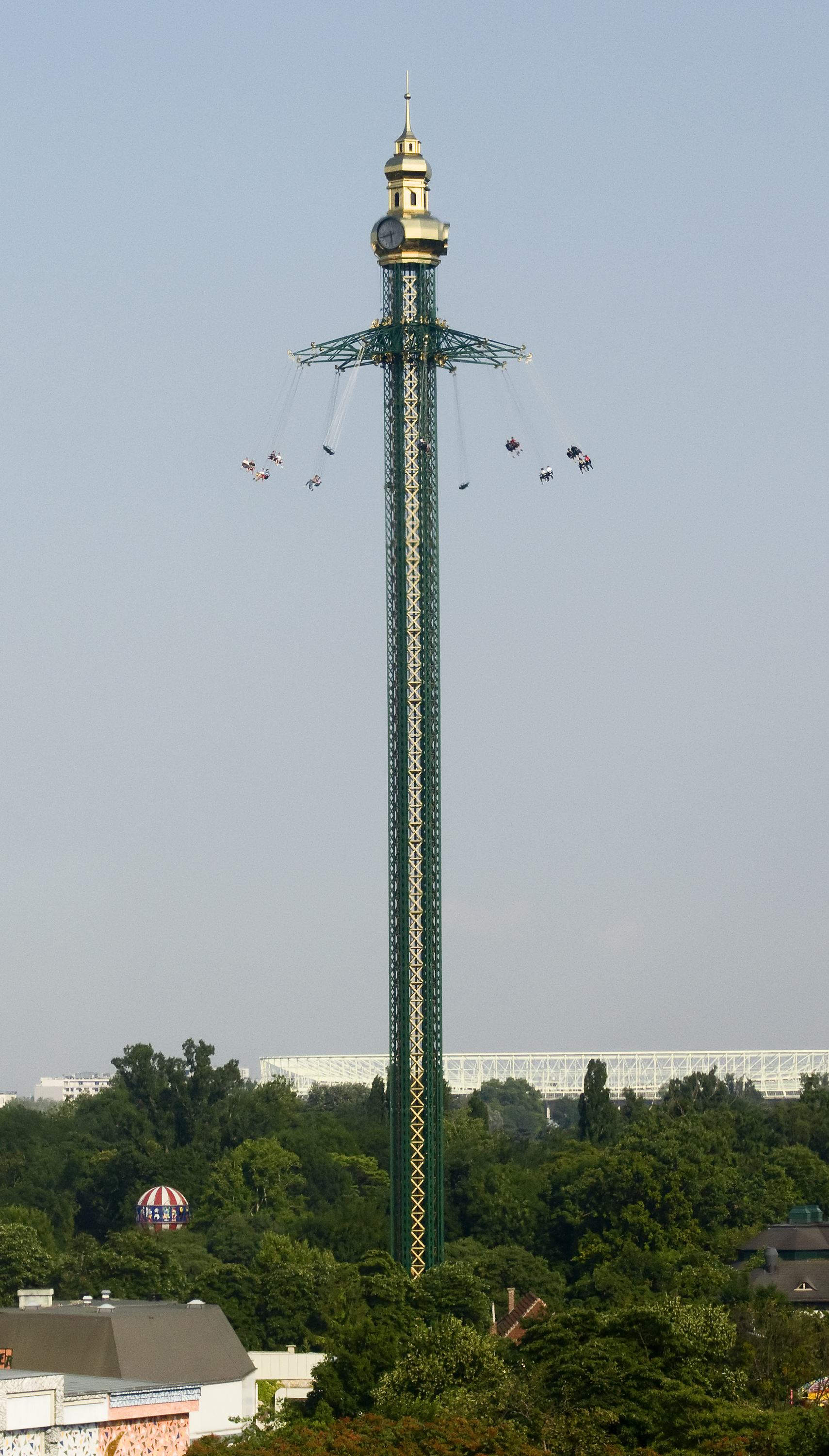
The Praterturm

=== Attractions ===
The park is home to over 250 rides and kiosks. Among its most notable attractions are two Ferris wheels: the famous Riesenrad, standing at 64.75 metres, which played an important role in The Third Man and Before Sunrise, and the lesser-known Blumenrad, which reaches 45 metres in height. The park also features 14 roller coasters, the largest and newest of which is Wiener Looping. During select seasons between 2016 to 2025, Olympia Looping, the world’s largest transportable roller coaster, was also temporarily installed. The oldest roller coaster is the wooden Auto BergBahn, which opened in 1948. Additionally, the park offers two log flumes, multiple ghost trains, bumper cars, a hall of mirrors, a funhouse, pendulum rides, and various chair swing rides, including the Praterturm, which reaches a height of 117 metres.

In addition, the park features several arcade halls, as well as an indoor skydiving facility and a bowling alley. It is also home to a Madame Tussauds wax museum, showcasing lifelike figures of famous personalities, including Mozart and Marie Antoinette. The Liliputbahn, a miniature railway, runs through the Prater amusement park. Nearby, Kugelmugel, a unique spherical building, has become a landmark in Vienna, known for its history as a self-declared micronation. The Planetarium Vienna, located near the park, offers astronomical shows and exhibits, providing an educational experience about space.

=== Food ===
The Wurstelprater offers a diverse range of culinary options. Among the most popular items are Lángos, a deep-fried Hungarian dough dish available at numerous stalls, and the Schweizerhaus restaurant. The restaurant is particularly known for serving authentic Budweiser beer, which is carbonated with a minimal amount of CO_{2} to accommodate its high turnover, resulting in a lighter taste. Another regional specialty served at the park is Schweinsstelze, roast pig’s knuckle.

=== Figures ===
The Prater is home to several distinctive statues and figures that have become important landmarks within the park. One of the most recognisable is Calafati, a large Chinese figure that stands as a unique attraction. Another prominent figure is the Watschenmann, a statue that reflects traditional Viennese humour. The park also features various comic statues, which depict characters from folklore and popular culture, including a large statue of the Wolfman.

== Gallery ==
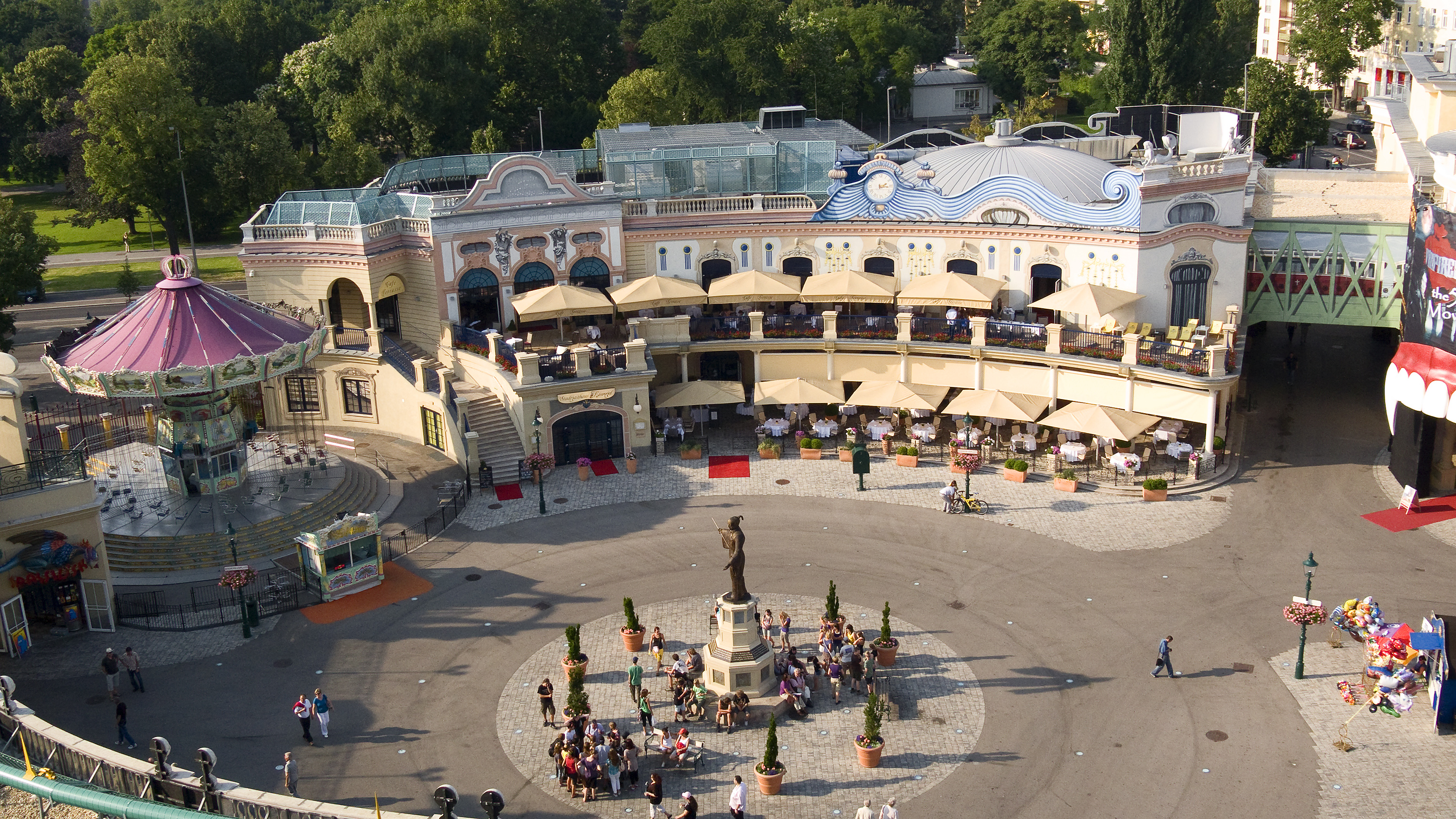
Riesenradplatz

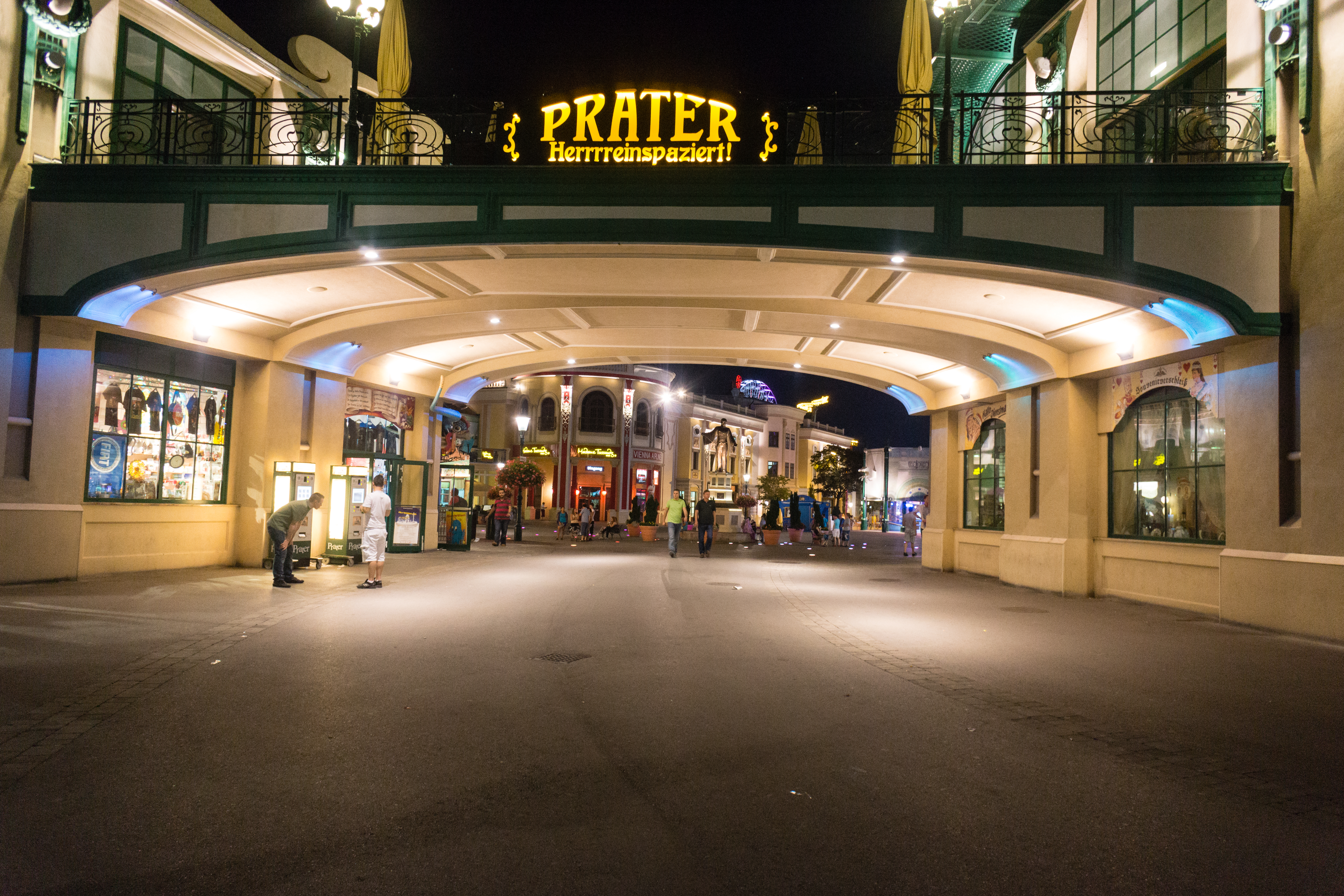
The entrance at night

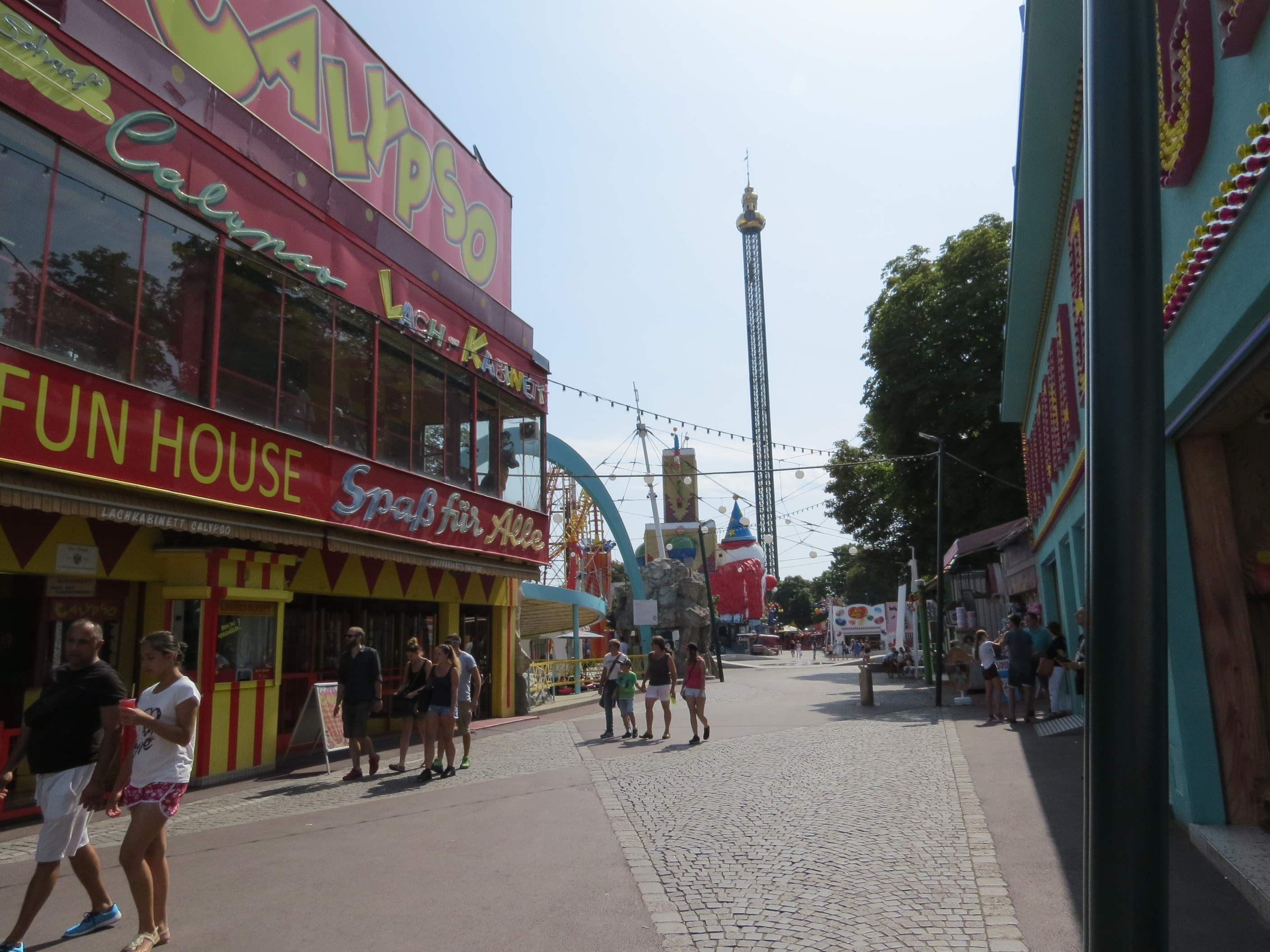
A path through the park

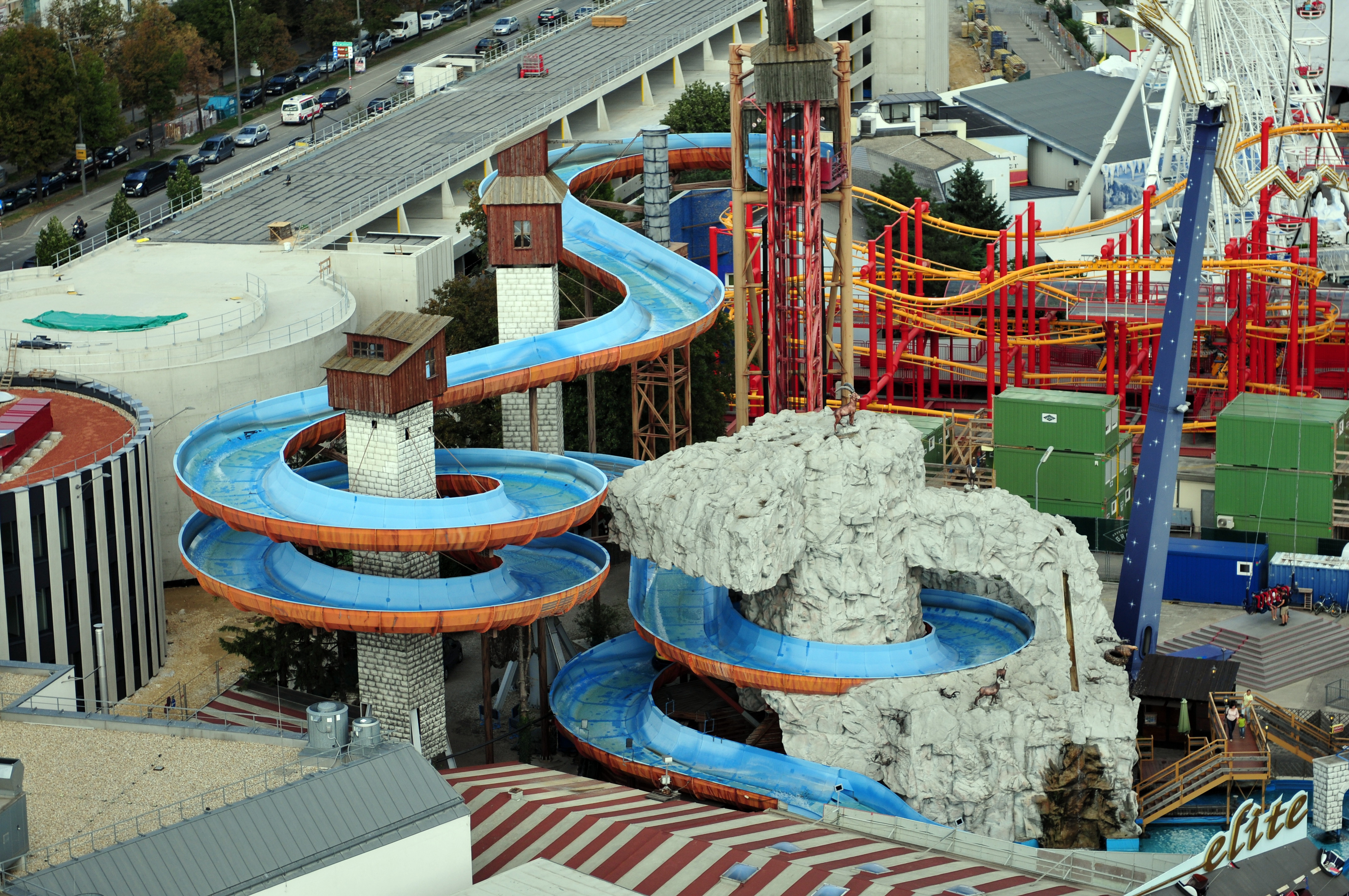
Wildalpenbahn ride

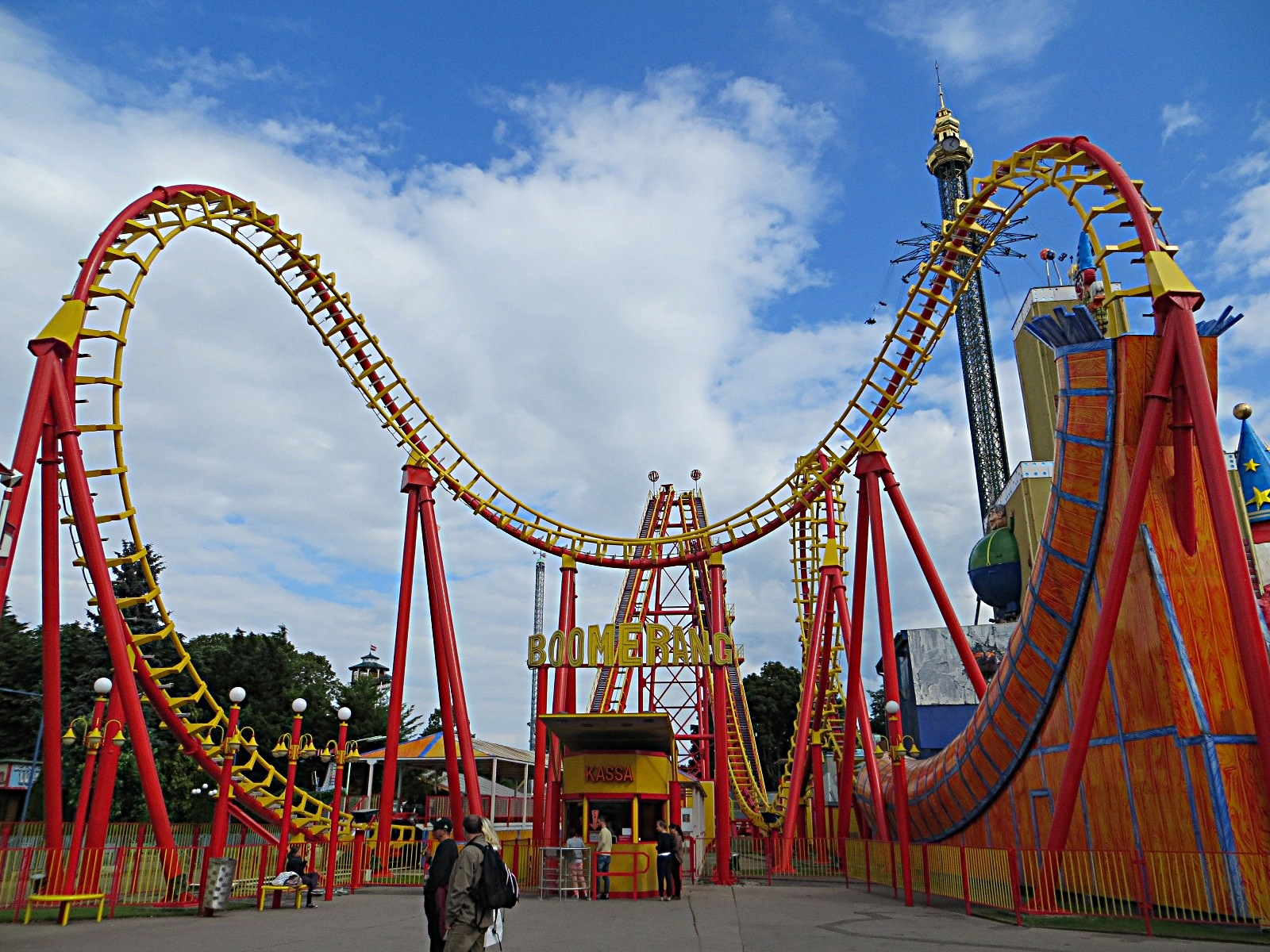
Boomerang roller coaster

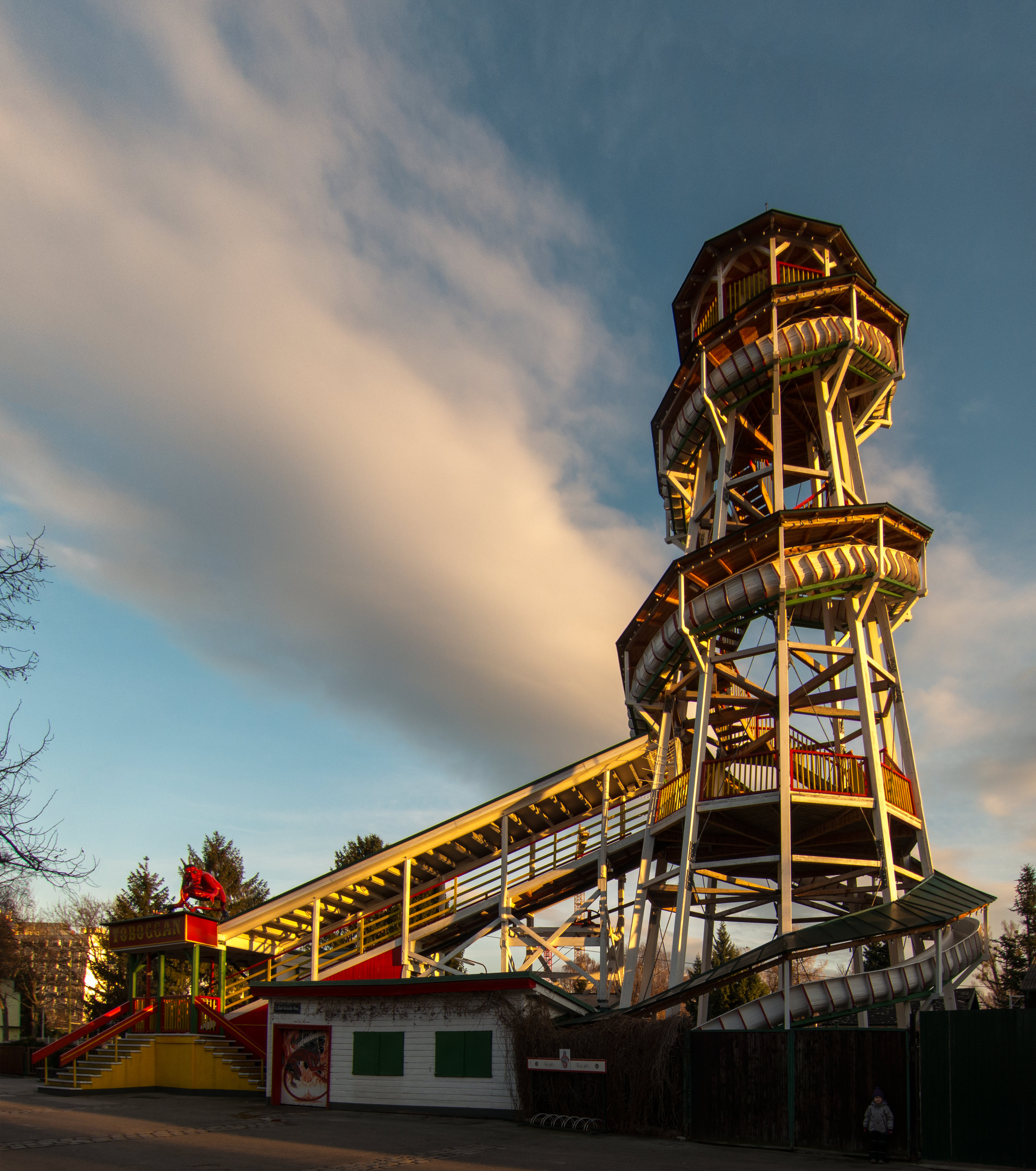
The Toboggan, a slide

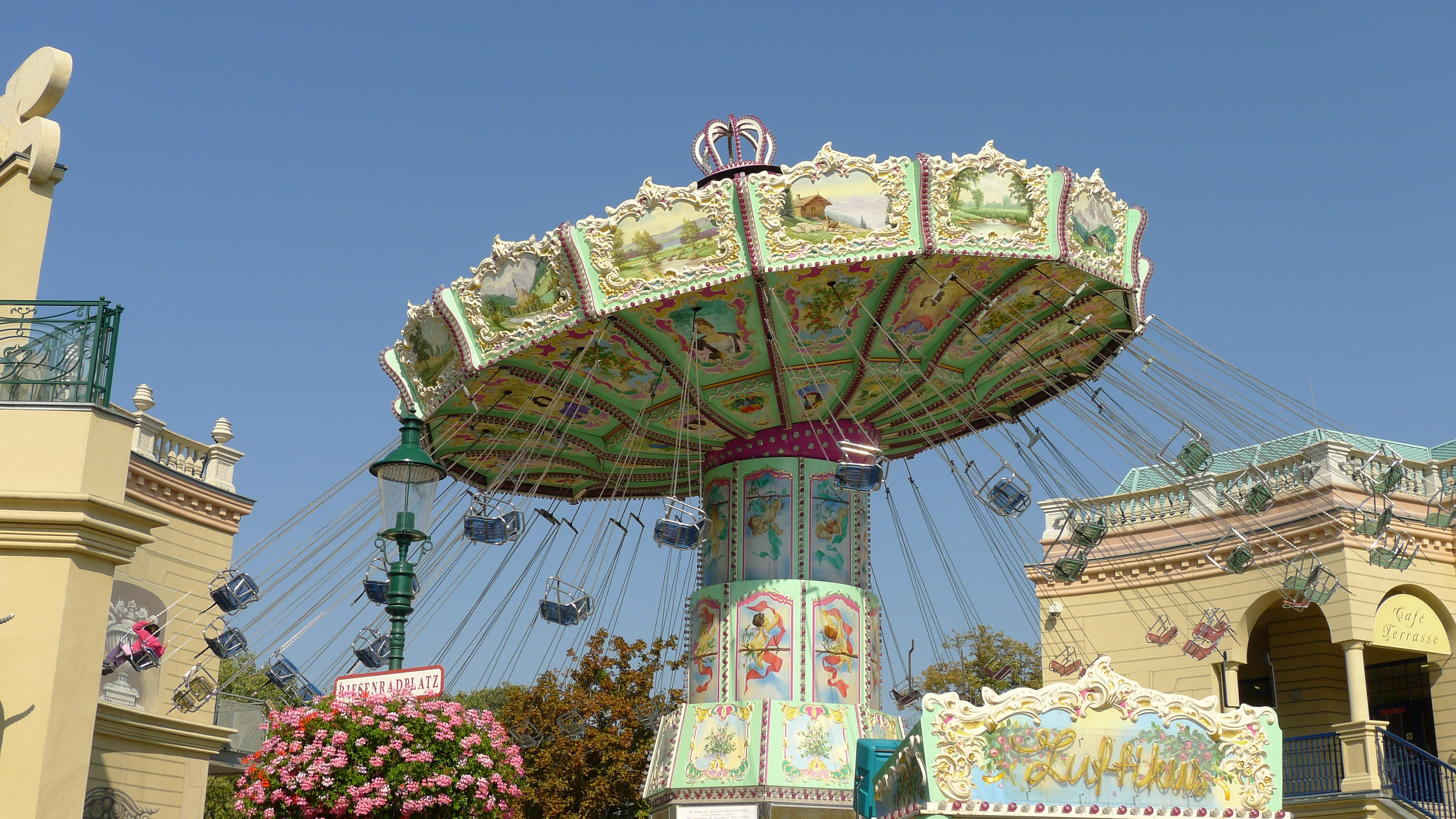
Chair swing ride

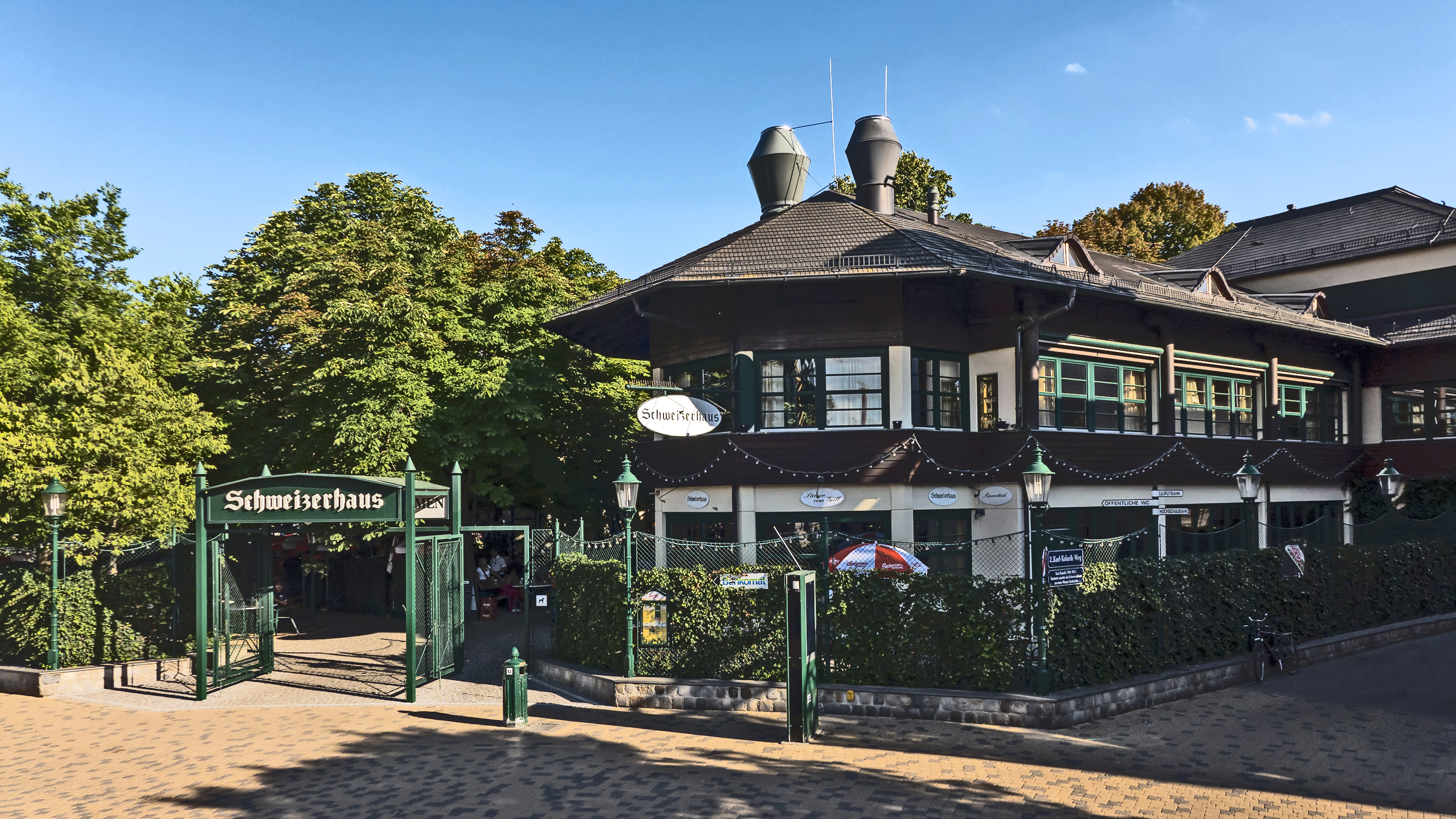
The Schweizerhaus

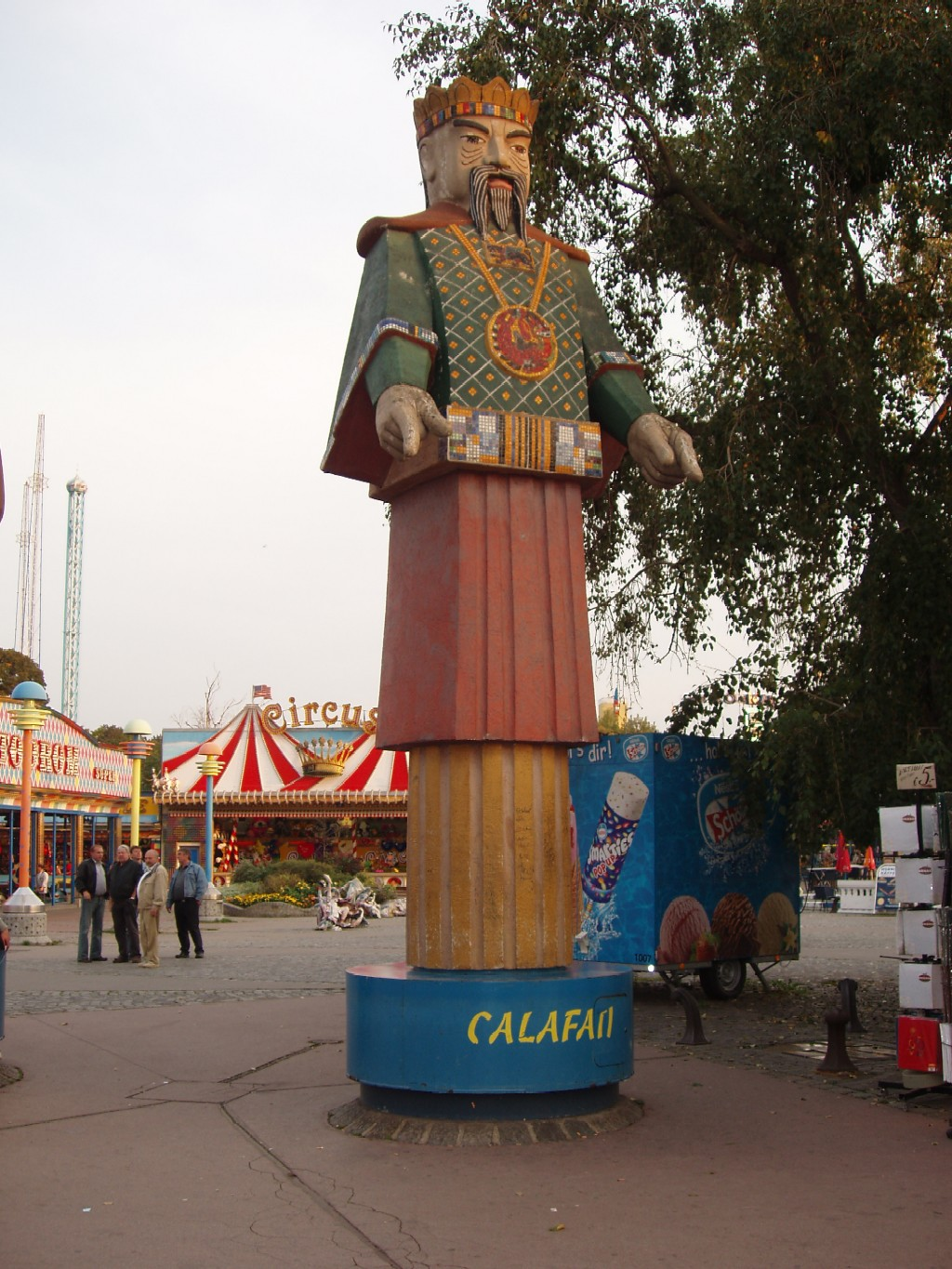
Calafati

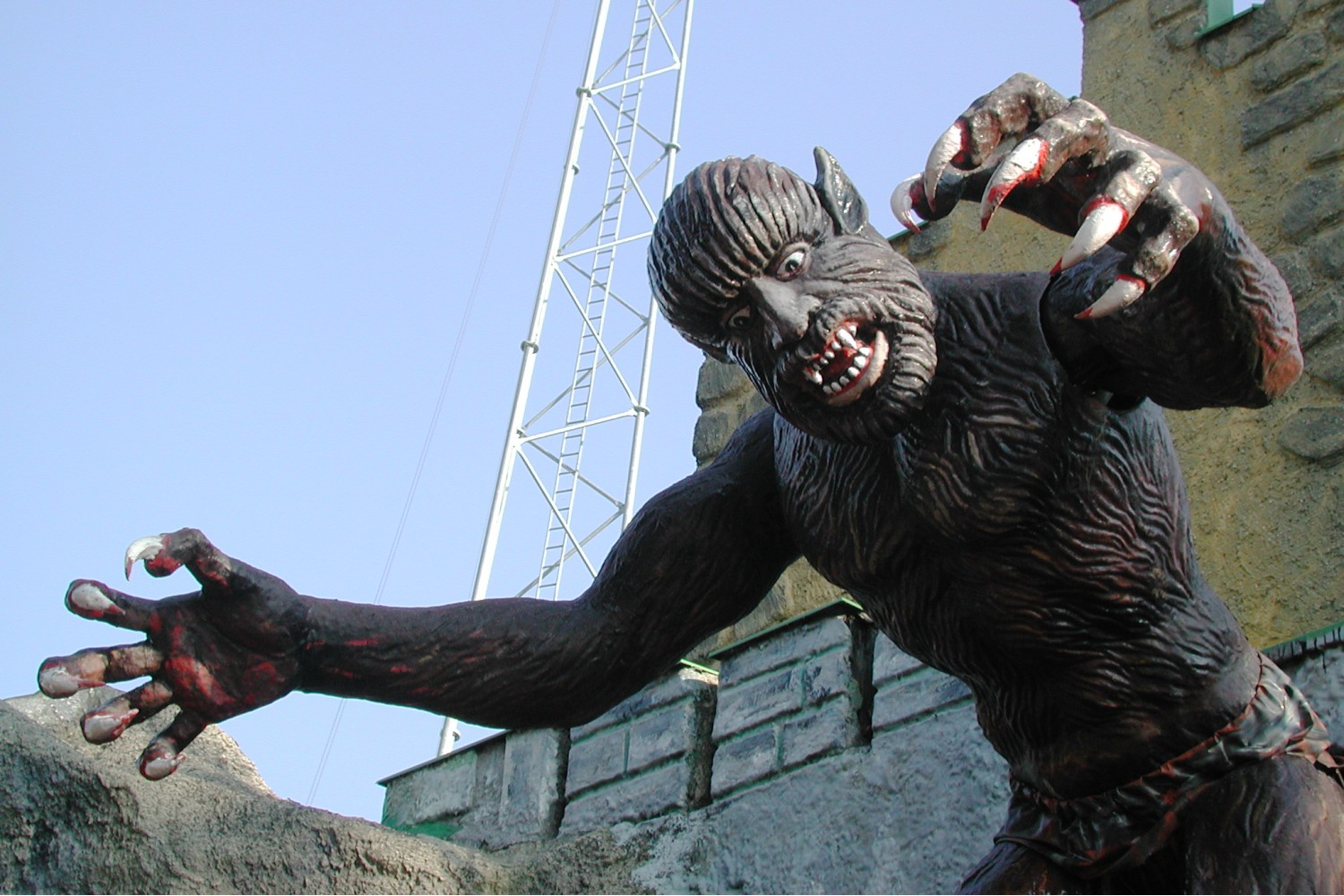
The wolf man

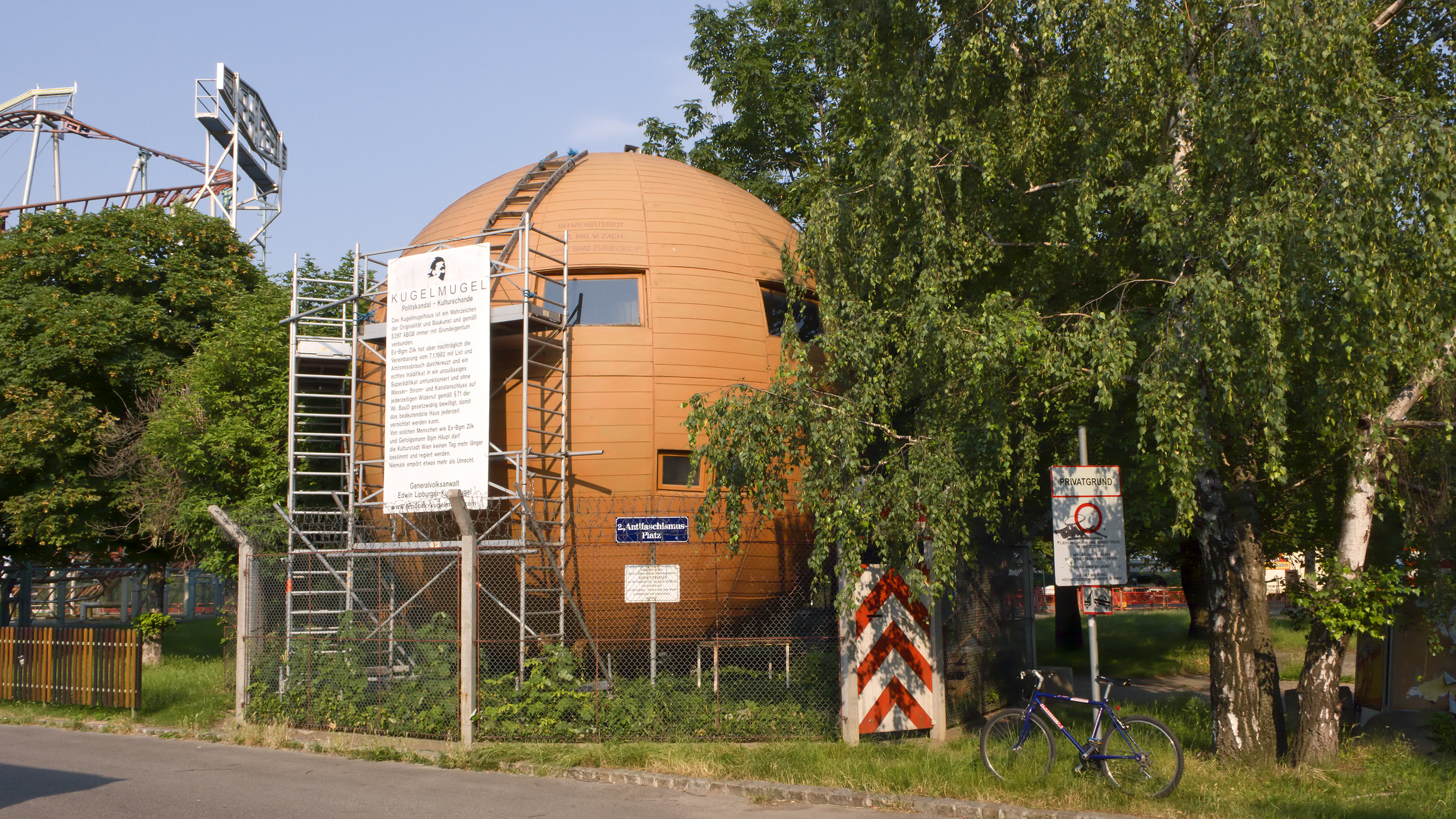
Kugelmugel

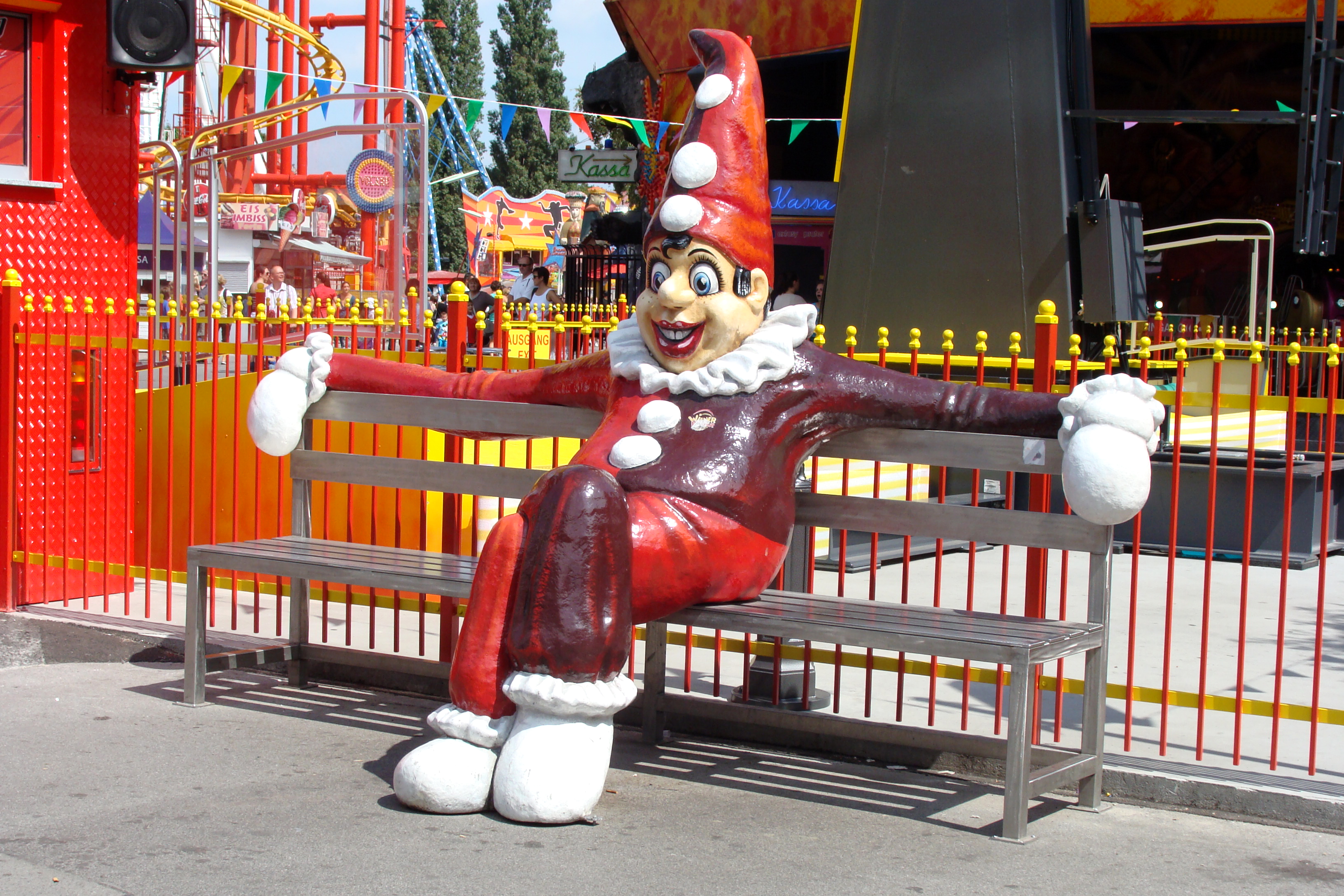
A statue in the park

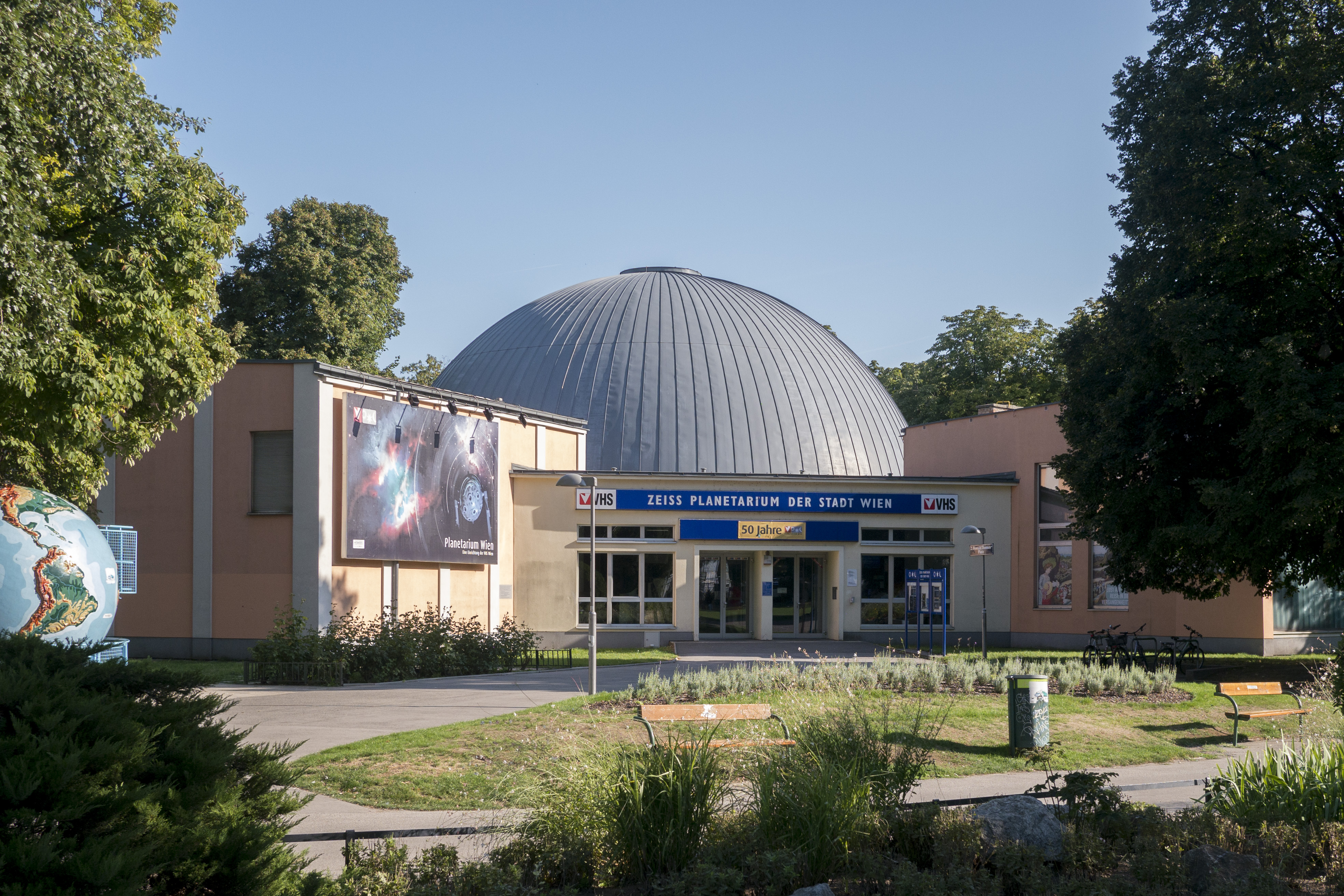
The Planetarium
