= German cuisine =

Culinary traditions of Germany

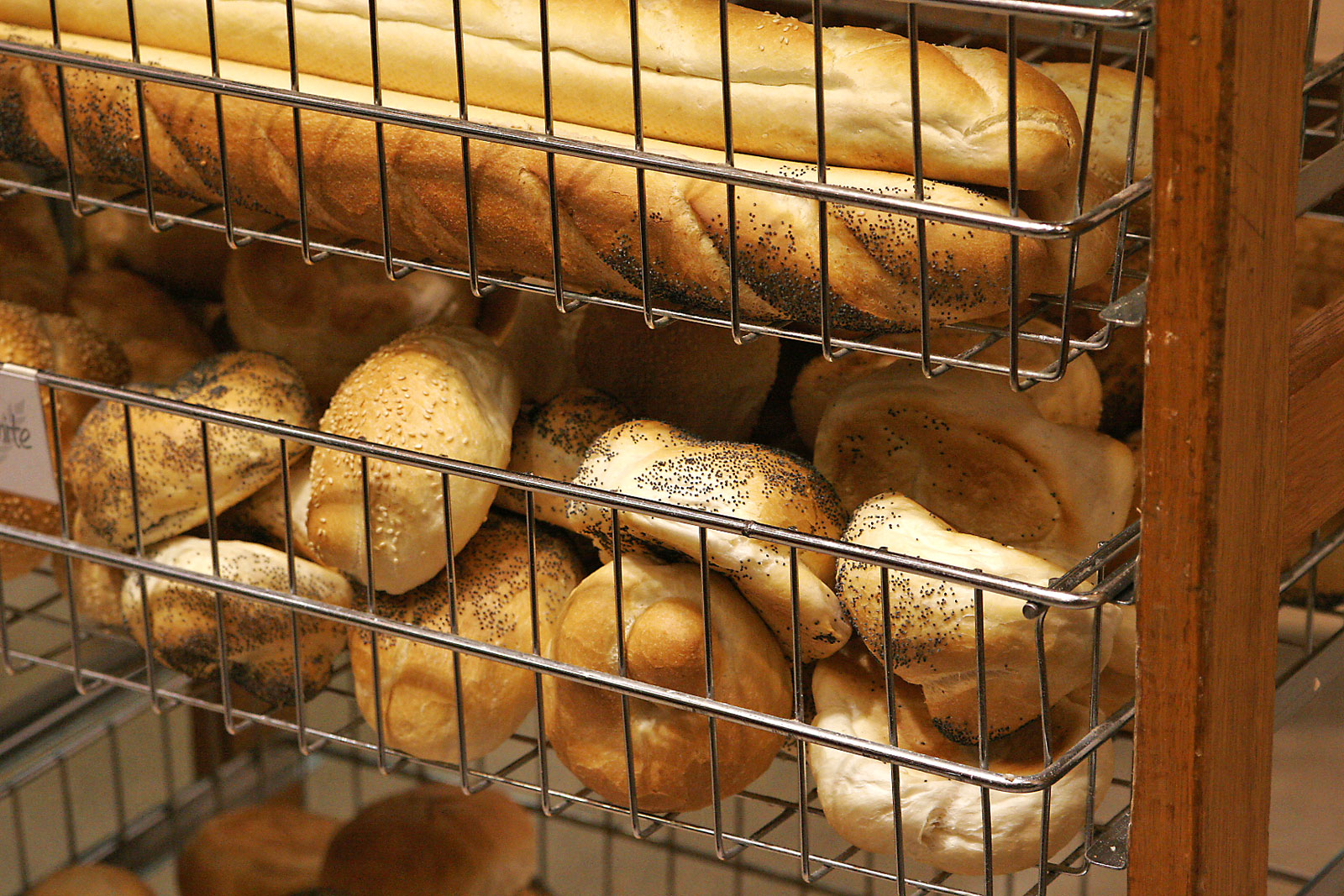
Brötchen or Semmel

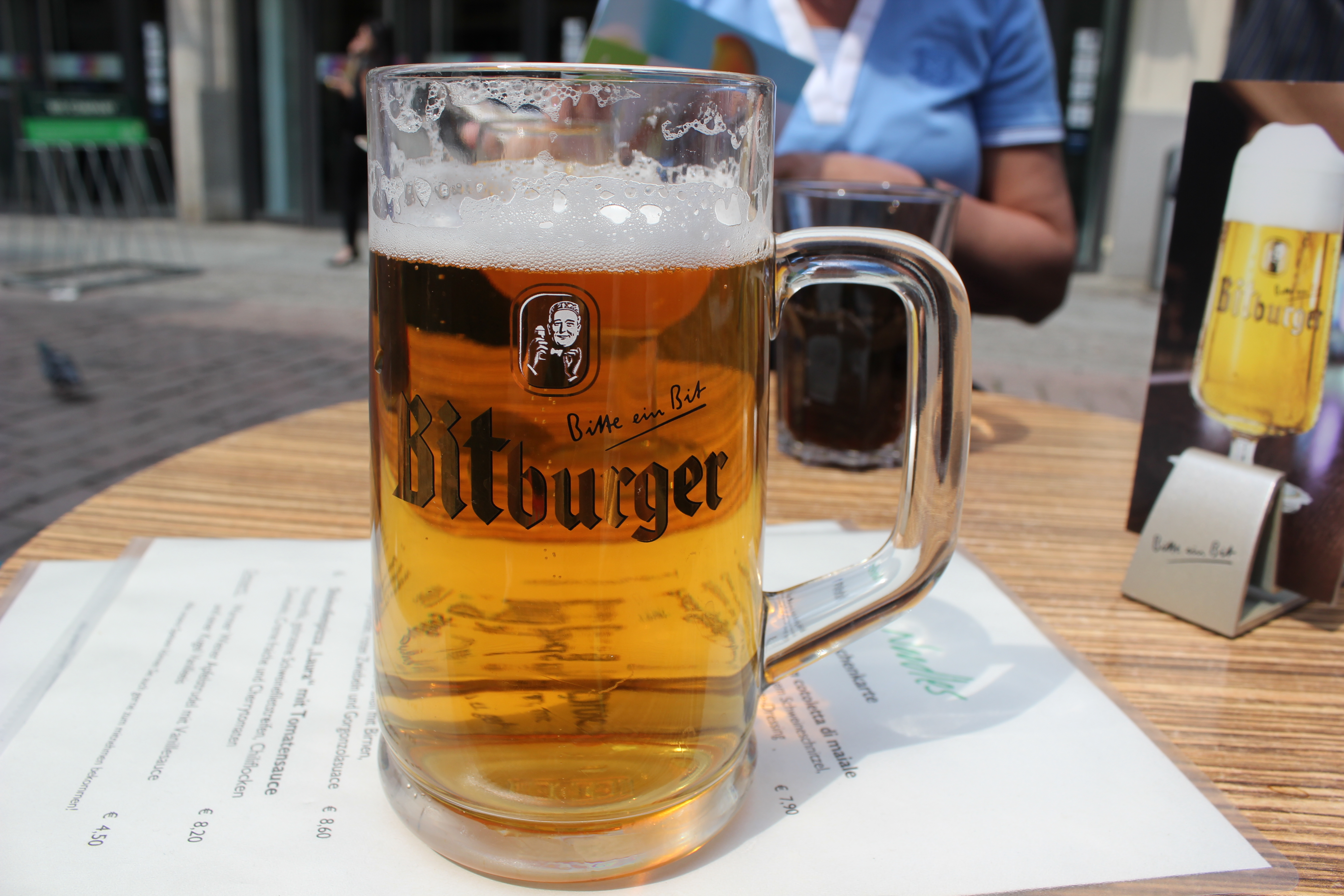
Lager beer

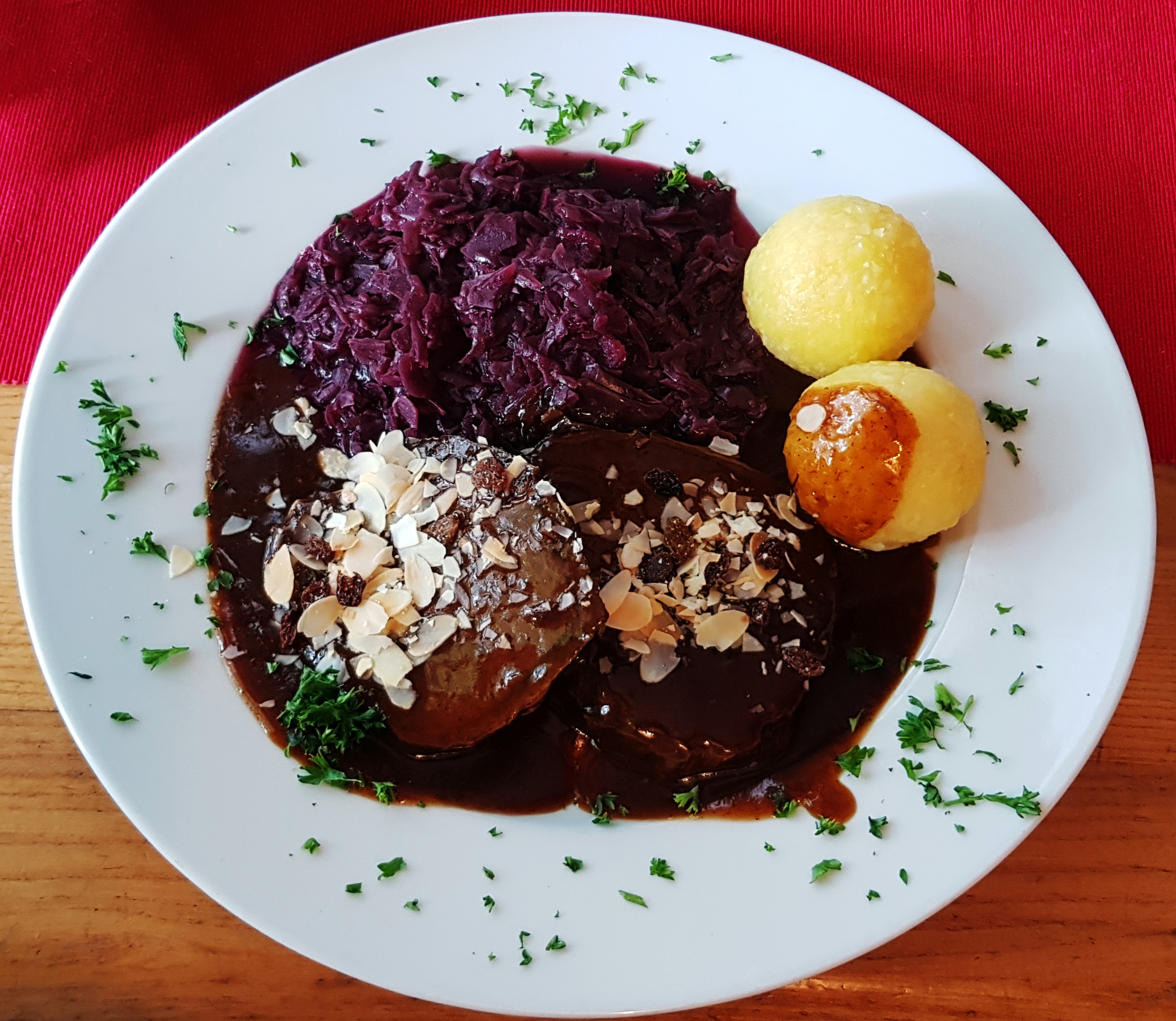
Sauerbraten with Kartoffelklöße

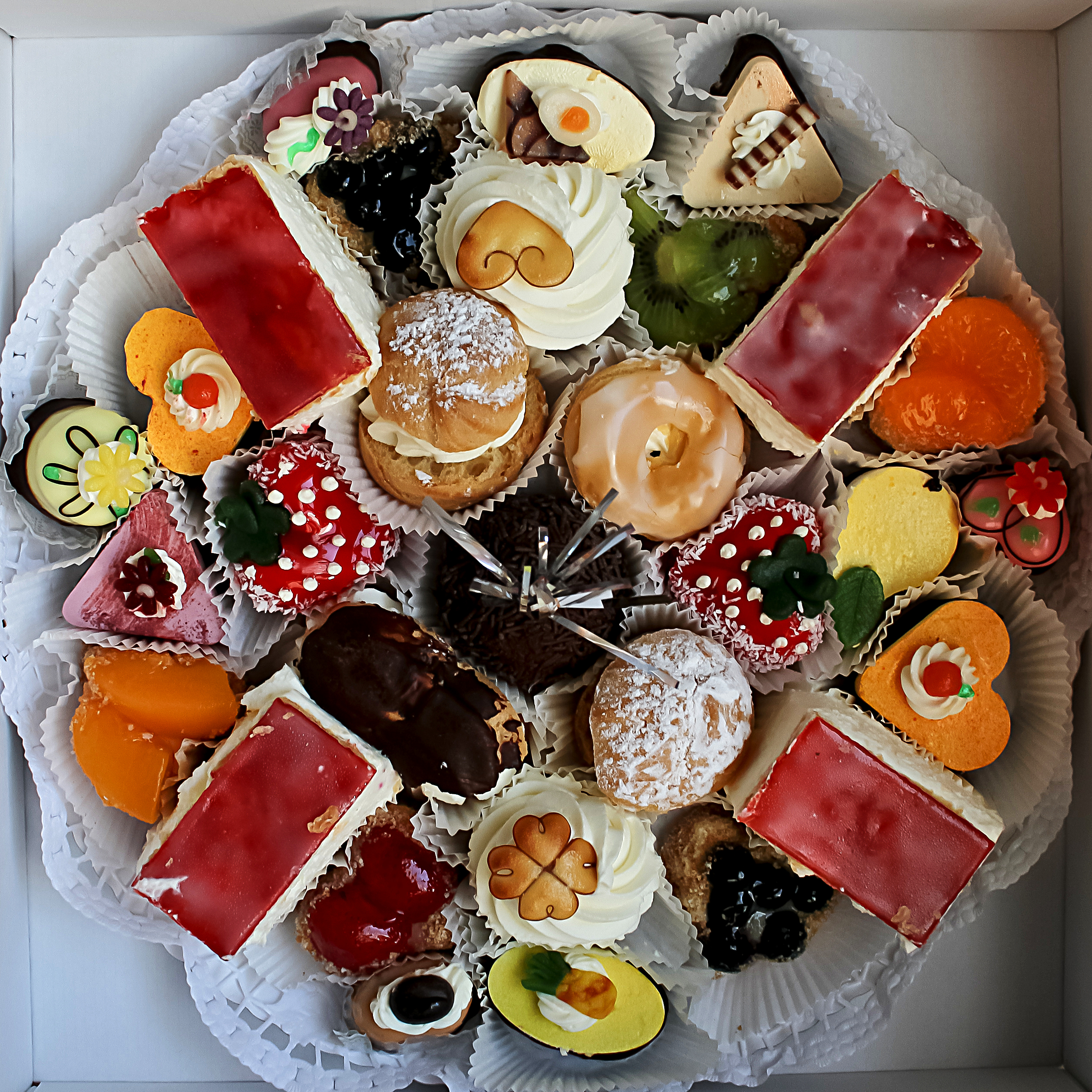
Desserts and pastries

German cuisine consists of many different local or regional cuisines, reflecting the country's federal history. Germany itself is part of the larger cultural region of Central Europe, sharing many culinary traditions with neighbouring countries such as Poland and the Czech Republic (and Slovakia as well). In Northern Europe, in Denmark more specifically, the traditional Danish cuisine had also been influenced by German cuisine in the past, hence several dishes being common between the two countries (e.g. potato salad).

At the same time, German cuisine also shares many similar characteristics with Western European cuisine, as is reflected by some common traditional dishes served in the Low Countries (i.e. Netherlands, Belgium, and, most notably, Luxembourg). Southern German regions, such as Bavaria and Swabia, share dishes with Austrian cuisine and parts of Swiss cuisine as well. The German cuisine has also influenced other European cuisines from Central-Eastern Europe such as those of Hungary or Romania, both countries sharing past and current German heritage in general, through their ethnic German minorities (see also, for example in this regard, the Transylvanian Saxon cuisine or Danube Swabian cuisine).

The Michelin Guide of 2025 awarded a three-star ranking (the highest designation) to 10 restaurants in Germany, while 46 more received two-star rankings and 265 one-star rankings. As of November 2017, Germany had the fourth-highest number of Michelin three-star restaurants in the world, after Japan, France, and the United States.

== Hot dishes ==
=== Meat ===
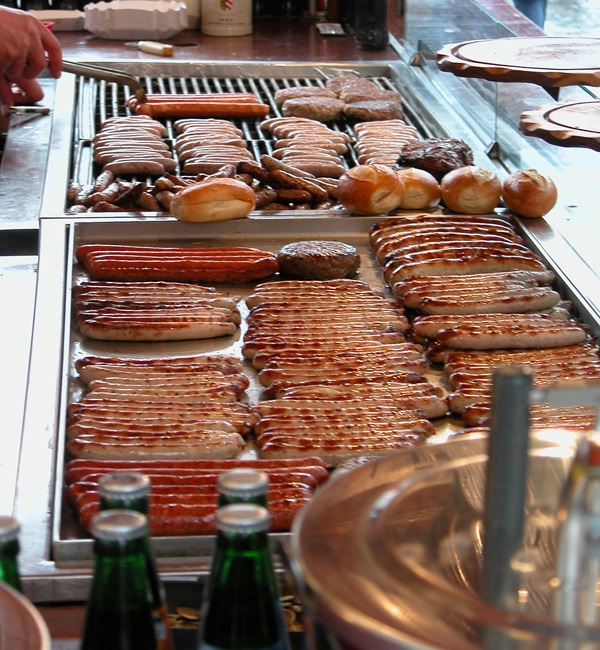
A variety of German Bratwürste

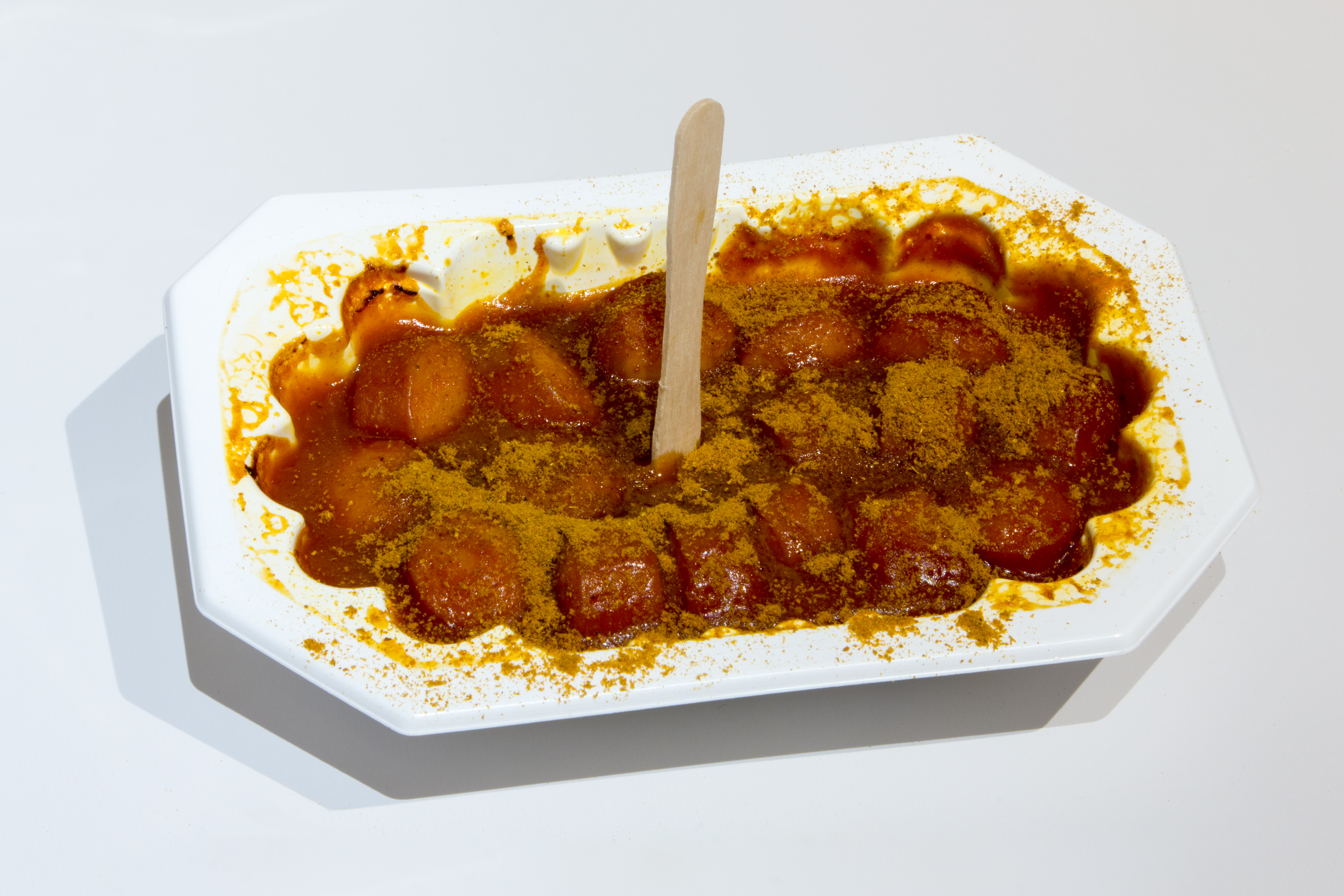
Currywurst

The average annual meat consumption is 59.7 kg (132 lb) per person. The most common varieties are pork, poultry, and beef.

Meat is usually braised; fried dishes also exist, but these recipes usually originate from France and Austria. Several cooking methods used to soften tough cuts have evolved into national specialties, including Sauerbraten (sour roast), involving marinating beef, horse meat or venison in a vinegar or wine vinegar mixture over several days.

A long tradition of sausage-making exists in Germany; more than 1,500 different types of sausage (German: Wurst) are made. Most Wurst is made with natural casings of pork, sheep or lamb intestines. Among the most popular and most common are Bratwurst, usually made of ground pork and spices, the Wiener (Viennese), which may be pork or beef and is smoked and fully cooked in a water bath, and Blutwurst (blood sausage) or Schwarzwurst (black sausage) made from blood (often of pigs or geese). Thousands of types of cold cuts also are available which are also called "Wurst" in German. There are many regional specialties, such as the Weißwurst (white sausage) popular in Bavaria or the Currywurst (depending on region, either a steamed pork sausage or a version of the Bratwurst, sliced and spiced with curry ketchup) popular in the metropolitan areas of Berlin, Hamburg and the Ruhr Area. Strict regulations governing what may and may not be put into them have been in force in Germany since the 13th century. In the market ordinance of Landshut in 1236, it was set down that only top-quality meat could be made into sausages. Different types of sausages include also: Bierschinken, Bockwurst, Frankfurter Würstchen, Jagdwurst, Knackwurst, Liverwurst, Mettwurst, Nürnberger Bratwürste, Nürnberger Rostbratwurst, Regensburger Wurst, Saumagen, Teewurst, Thuringian sausage, Westfälische Rinderwurst and Wollwurst.

=== Fish ===
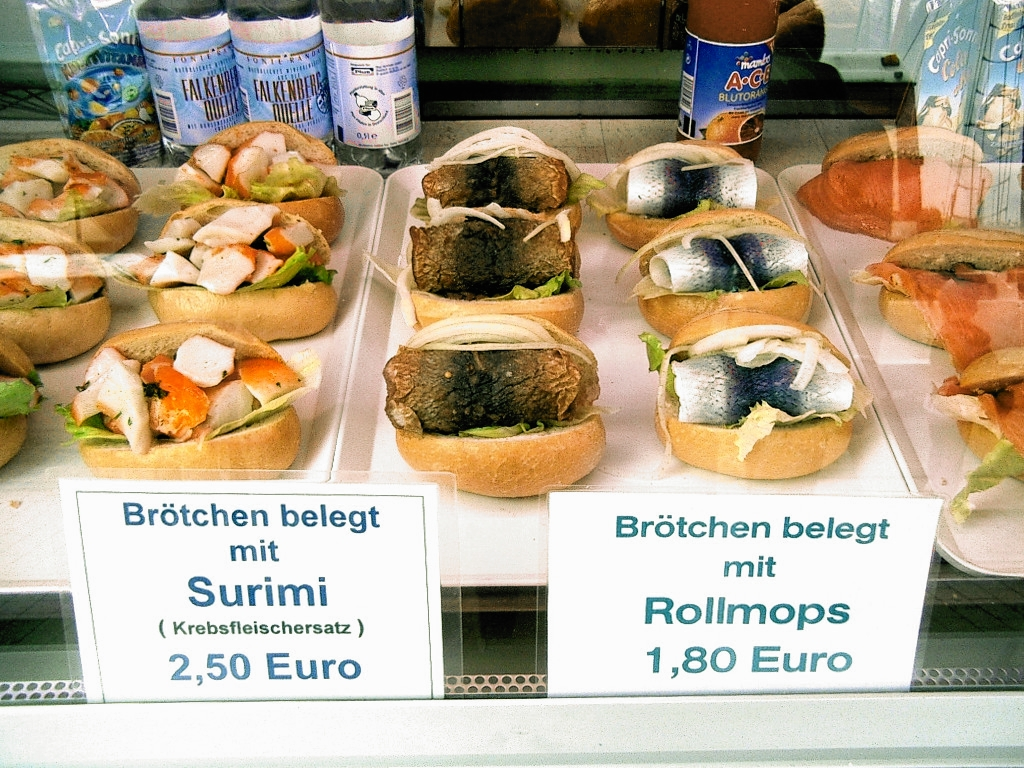
A variety of Fischbrötchen, including with Rollmops

Of saltwater fish, whitefish such as Alaska pollock, Atlantic herring, Atlantic cod and saithe are the most common. Popular freshwater fish on the German menu are trout, pike, carp, and European perch also are listed frequently. These fish are often served grilled, fried as "Backfisch" or "Fischfrikadelle", or in a soup. Seafood traditionally was restricted to the northern coastal areas, except for pickled herring, which was often served in a Fischbrötchen, as Rollmops (a pickled herring fillet rolled into a cylindrical shape around a piece of pickled gherkin or onion), or Brathering (fried, marinated herring).

Today, many sea fish, such as fresh herring, tuna, mackerel, salmon and sardines, are well established throughout the country. Prior to the industrial revolution and the ensuing pollution of the rivers, salmon were common in the rivers Rhine, Elbe, and Oder and only slowly started to return along with a growing consciousness for environmental questions and resulting measures, such as state-of-the-art sewage plant and reduction of agricultural runoff.

Fish fingers, known as Fischstäbchen (lit.: "fish sticklets"), are a popular processed food made using whitefish such as cod, haddock or pollock, which has been battered or breaded.

=== Vegetables ===
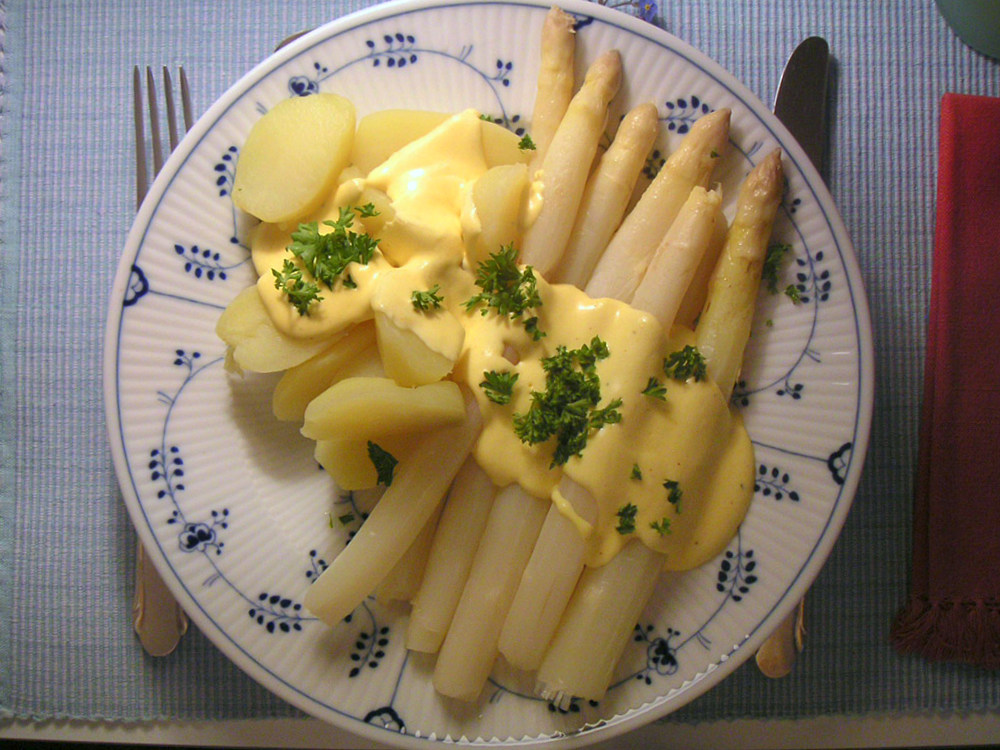
Typical serving of asparagus with Hollandaise sauce and potatoes

Vegetables are often used in stews or vegetable soups, but are also served as side dishes. Carrots, cauliflower, turnips, spinach, peas, beans, broccoli and many types of cabbage are very common. Fried onions are a common addition to many meat dishes throughout the country. Circa 1900, carrots were sometimes roasted in water, with the broth used in place of coffee.

Asparagus is a popular seasonal side or main dish with a yearly per-capita consumption of 1.5 kg (3.3 lb). The white variety is especially popular in Germany and more common than green asparagus. Restaurants will sometimes devote an entire menu to nothing but white asparagus when it is in season. Spargel season (German: Spargelzeit or Spargelsaison) traditionally begins in mid-April and ends on St. John's Day (24 June).

== Structure of meals ==
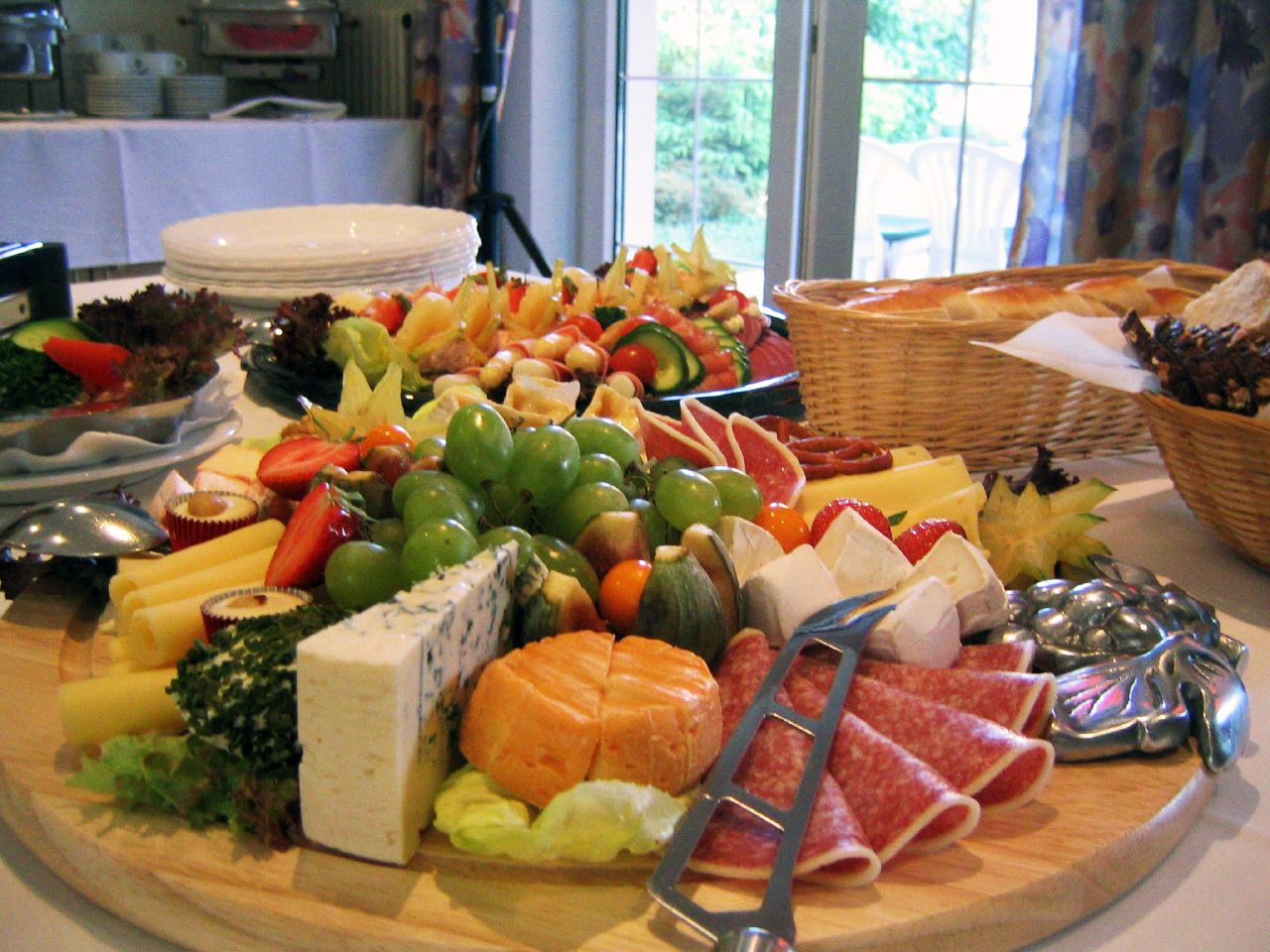
German breakfast foods

Breakfast (Frühstück, pronounced [ˈfʁyːˌʃtʏk]) commonly consists of bread, toast, or bread rolls with butter or margarine, cold cuts, cheeses, jam (Konfitüre or more commonly called Marmelade), honey and eggs (typically boiled). Common drinks at breakfast are coffee, tea, milk, cocoa (hot or cold) or fruit juices. It is very common to eat hearty toppings at breakfast, including deli meats like ham, salted meats, salami and meat-based spreads such as Leberwurst (liver sausage), Teewurst or Mettwurst, and cheeses such as Gouda, Frischkäse (cream cheese), Brie, Harzer Roller, Tilsiter cheese, Bergkäse and more. Most bakeries tend to sell belegte Brötchen (sandwiches from bread rolls), especially in the morning, for people on the go.

Traditionally, the main meal of the day has been lunch (Mittagessen, pronounced [ˈmɪtaːkˌʔɛsn̩]), eaten around noon. Dinner (Abendessen, pronounced [ˈaːbn̩tˌʔɛsn̩], or Abendbrot) was always a smaller meal, often consisting only of a variety of breads, meat or sausages, cheese and some kind of vegetables, similar to breakfast, or possibly sandwiches. Smaller meals added during the day bear names such as Vesper (in the south), Brotzeit (bread time, also in the south), Kaffee und Kuchen (literally for "coffee and cake"), or Kaffeetrinken. It is a very German custom and comparable with the English five-o'clock tea. It takes time between lunch and dinner, often on Sundays with the entire family.

However, in Germany, as in other parts of Europe, dining habits have changed over the last 50 years. Today, many people eat only a small meal in the middle of the day at work, often also a second breakfast, and enjoy a hot dinner in the evening at home with the whole family.

For others, the traditional way of eating is still rather common, not only in rural areas. Breakfast is still very popular and may be elaborate and extended on weekends, with friends invited as guests; the same holds for coffee and cake. Since the 1990s, the Sunday brunch has also become common, especially in city cafés.

== Side dishes ==
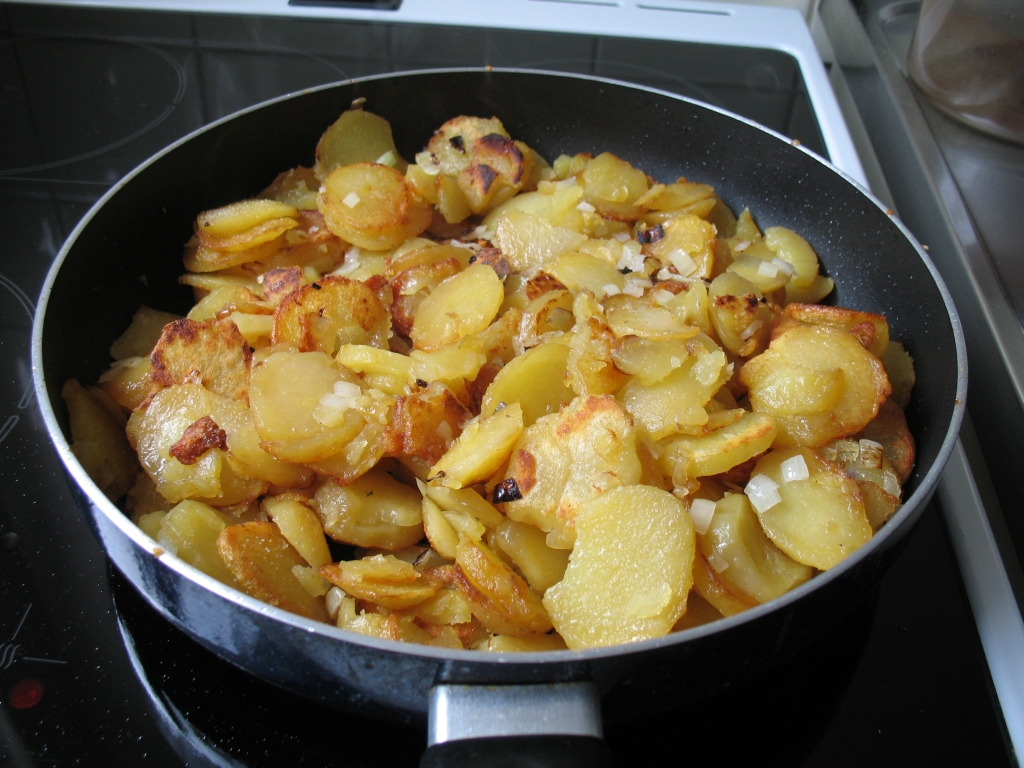
German fries (German: Bratkartoffeln)

Noodles, made from wheat flour and egg, are usually thicker than the Italian flat pasta. Especially in the southwestern part of the country, the predominant variety of noodles are Spätzle, made with a large number of eggs, and Maultaschen, traditional stuffed noodles reminiscent of ravioli.

Besides noodles, potatoes are common. Potatoes entered German cuisine in the late 17th century, were promoted by German rulers like Frederick the Great in the 18th century (see Potato Edict) and became almost ubiquitous by the 19th century. They most often are boiled (in salt water, Salzkartoffeln), but mashed (Kartoffelpüree or Kartoffelbrei) and pan-roasted potatoes (Bratkartoffeln) also are traditional. French fries, called Pommes frites, Pommes (spoken as "Pom fritz" or, respectively, "Pommès", deviating from the French pronunciation which would be "Pom freet" or "Pom") or regionally as Fritten in German, are a common style of fried potatoes; they are traditionally offered with either ketchup or mayonnaise, or, as Pommes rot/weiß (lit. fries red/white), with both.

Also common are dumplings (including Klöße as the term in the north or Knödel as the term in the south) and in southern Germany potato noodles, including Schupfnudeln, which are similar to Italian gnocchi.

Salads, also modern variations, as well as vegetarian dishes are increasingly popular in Germany.

== Spices and condiments ==
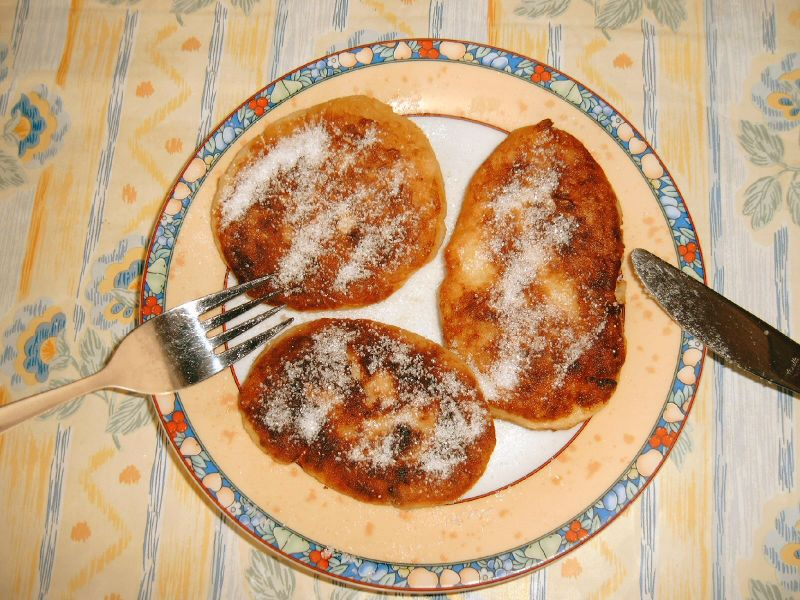
Quarkkäulchen, a pancake-like dessert with sugar and cinnamon

With the exception of mustard, horseradish, and hot paprika, German dishes are rarely hot and spicy. The most popular herbs and spices are traditionally anise, bay leaves, borage, caraway, chives, curry powder, dill weed, juniper berries, lovage, marjoram, paprika, and parsley. Cardamom, anise seed and cinnamon are often used in sweet cakes or beverages associated with Christmas time, and sometimes in the preparation of sausages, but are otherwise rare in German meals. Other herbs and spices, such as basil, sage, oregano, hot chili peppers, and curry powder have become popular since the early 1980s. Fresh dill is very common in a green salad or fish fillet.

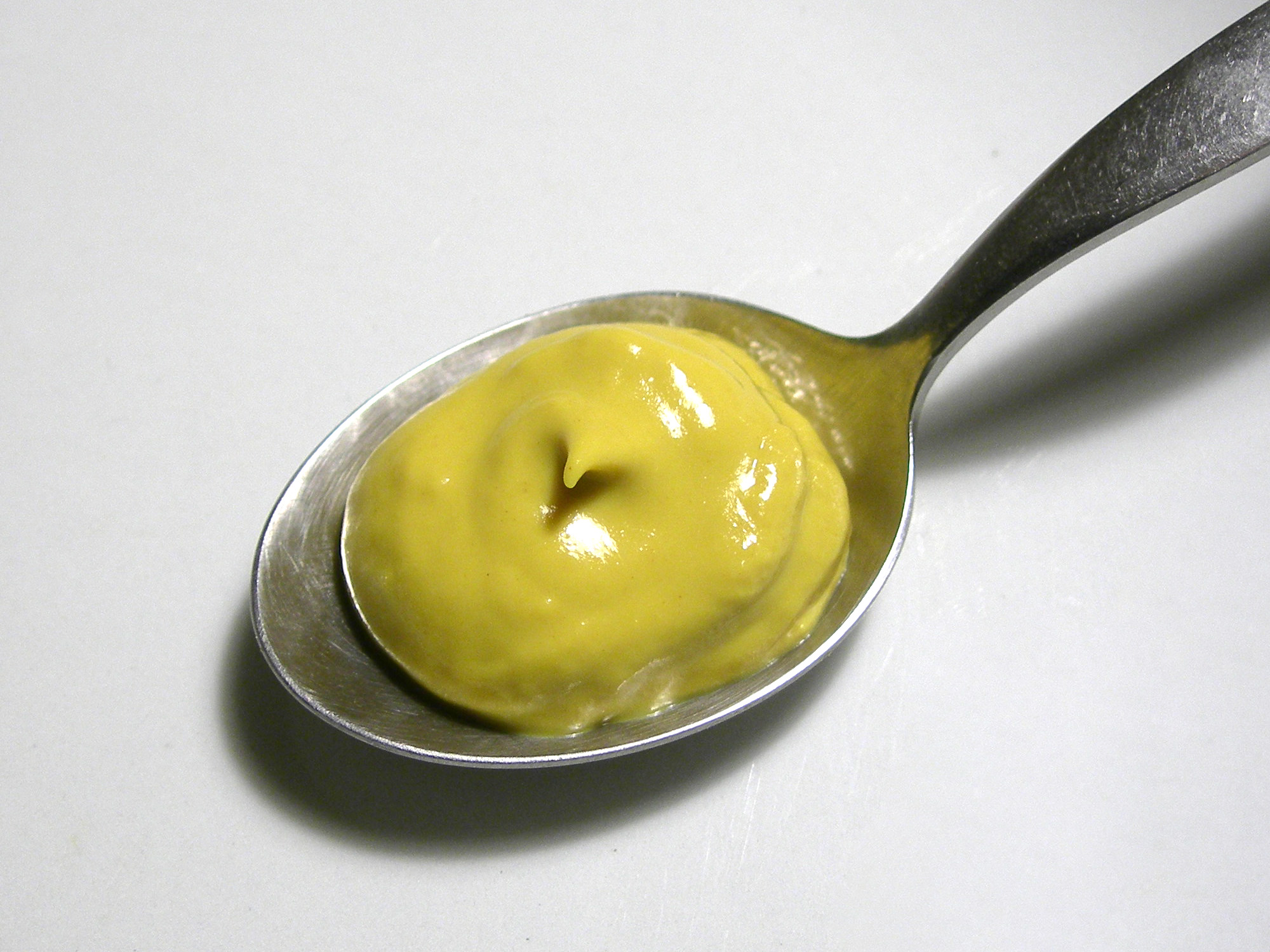
Traditional German mustard

Mustard (Senf) is a very common accompaniment to sausages and can vary in strength, the most common version being Mittelscharf (medium hot), which is somewhere between traditional English and French mustards in strength. Düsseldorf, similar to French's Deli Mustard with a taste that is very different from Dijon, and the surrounding area are known for its particularly spicy mustard, which is used both as a table condiment and in local dishes such as Senfrostbraten (pot roast with mustard). In the southern parts of the country, a sweet variety of mustard is made which is almost exclusively served with the Bavarian speciality Weißwurst. German mustard is usually considerably less acidic than American varieties.

Horseradish is commonly used as a condiment either on its own served as a paste, enriched with cream (Sahnemeerrettich), or combined with mustard. In some regions of Germany, it is used with meats and sausages where mustard would otherwise be used. Its use in Germany has been documented to the 16th century, when it was used as medicine, and as a food, whereby its leaves were consumed as a vegetable.

Garlic has never played a large role in traditional German cuisine, but has risen in popularity in recent decades due to the influence of French, Italian, Spanish, Portuguese, Greek, Arab, and Turkish cuisines. Ramson, a rediscovered herb from earlier centuries, has become quite popular again since the 1990s.

== Desserts ==
A wide variety of cakes, tarts and pastries are served throughout the country, most commonly made with fresh fruit. Apples, plums, strawberries, and cherries are used regularly in cakes. Cheesecake is also very popular, often made with quark. Schwarzwälder Kirschtorte (Black Forest cake, made with cherries) is probably the most well-known example of a wide variety of typically German tortes filled with whipped or butter cream. Fanta cake is of German origin.

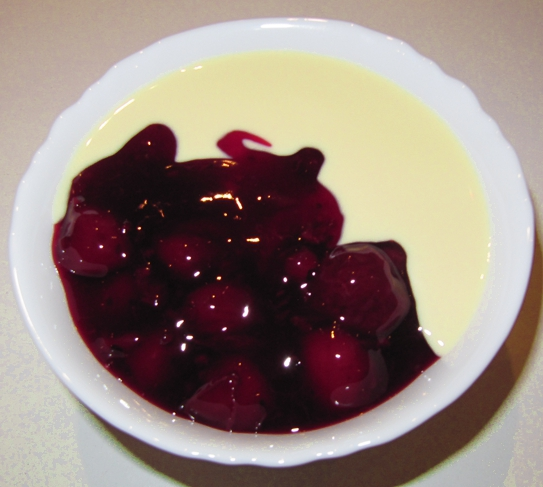
Rote Grütze with vanilla sauce

German doughnuts (which have no hole) are usually balls of yeast dough with jam or other fillings, and are known as Berliner, Pfannkuchen (in Berlin and Eastern Germany), Kreppel or Krapfen, depending on the region. Eierkuchen or Pfannkuchen are large (usually around 20–24 cm in diameter), and relatively thin (~5mm) pancakes, comparable to the French crêpes. They are served covered with sugar, jam or syrup. Savory variants with cheese, ground meat or bacon exist as well as variants with apple slices baked in (called Apfelpfannkuchen, literally for apple pancakes), but they are usually considered to be main dishes rather than desserts. In some regions, Eierkuchen are filled and then wrapped. The word Pfannkuchen means pancake in most parts of Germany.

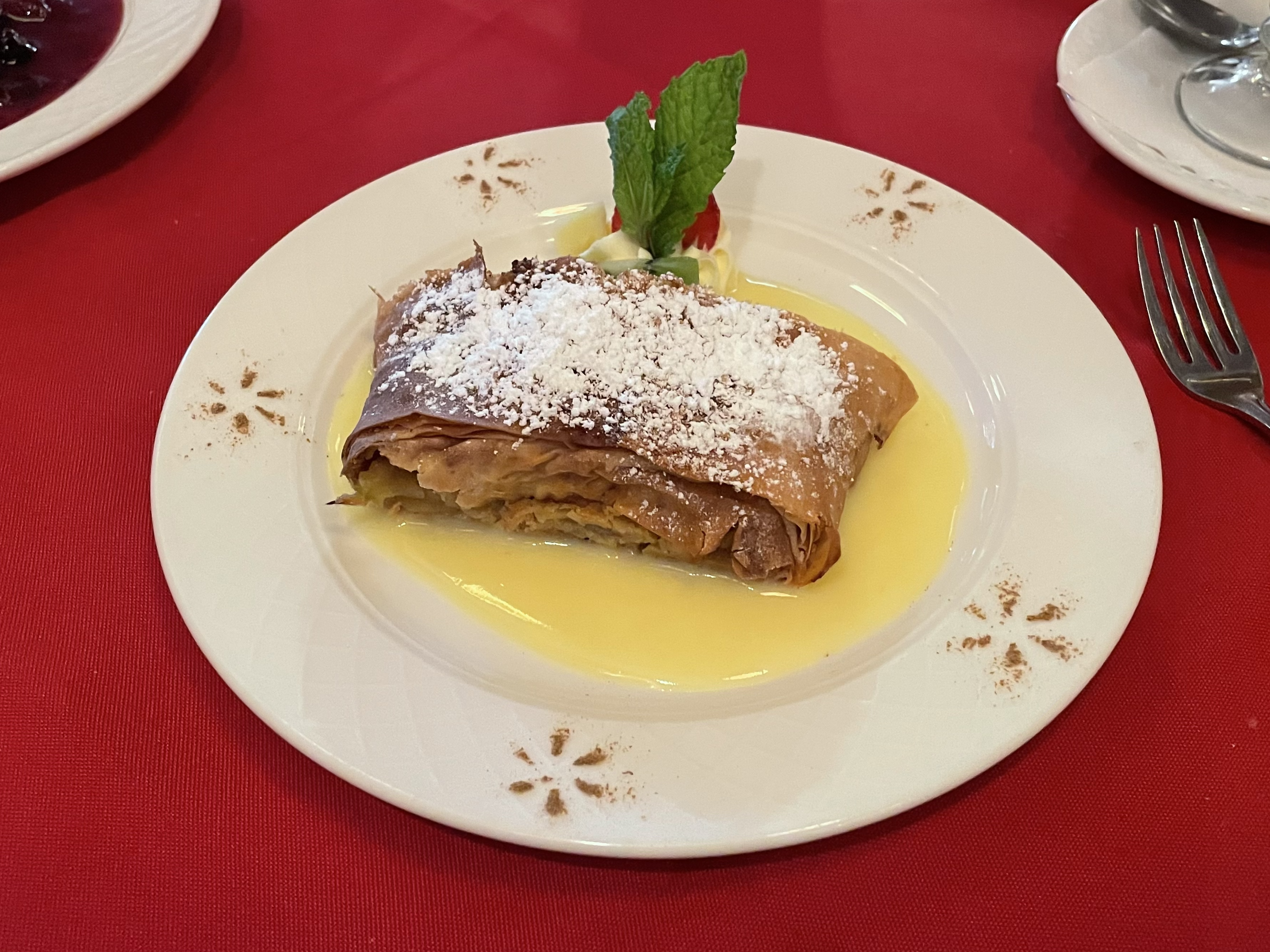
Apple strudel (German: Apfelstrudel), a traditional Austrian and Bavarian dessert, served with powdered sugar on top and vanilla sauce underneath

A popular dessert in northern Germany is Rote Grütze, red fruit pudding, which is made with black and red currants, raspberries and sometimes strawberries or cherries cooked in juice with corn starch as a thickener. It is traditionally served with cream, but also is served with vanilla sauce, milk or whipped cream. Rhabarbergrütze (rhubarb pudding) and Grüne Grütze (gooseberry fruit pudding) are variations of the Rote Grütze. A similar dish, Obstkaltschale, may also be found all around Germany.

Ice cream and sorbets are also very popular. Italian-run ice cream parlours were the first large wave of foreign-run eateries in Germany, which began around the mid-1850s, becoming widespread in the 1920s. Spaghettieis, which resembles spaghetti, tomato sauce, and ground cheese on a plate, originated in Germany and is a popular ice cream dessert.

== Holidays ==
On the Christmas Days following Christmas Eve, roast goose is a staple of Christmas Day meals. It is sometimes replaced with European carp, particularly in Southern areas. The carp is cut into pieces, coated in breadcrumbs and fried in fat. Common side dishes are potato salad, cucumber salad or potatoes.

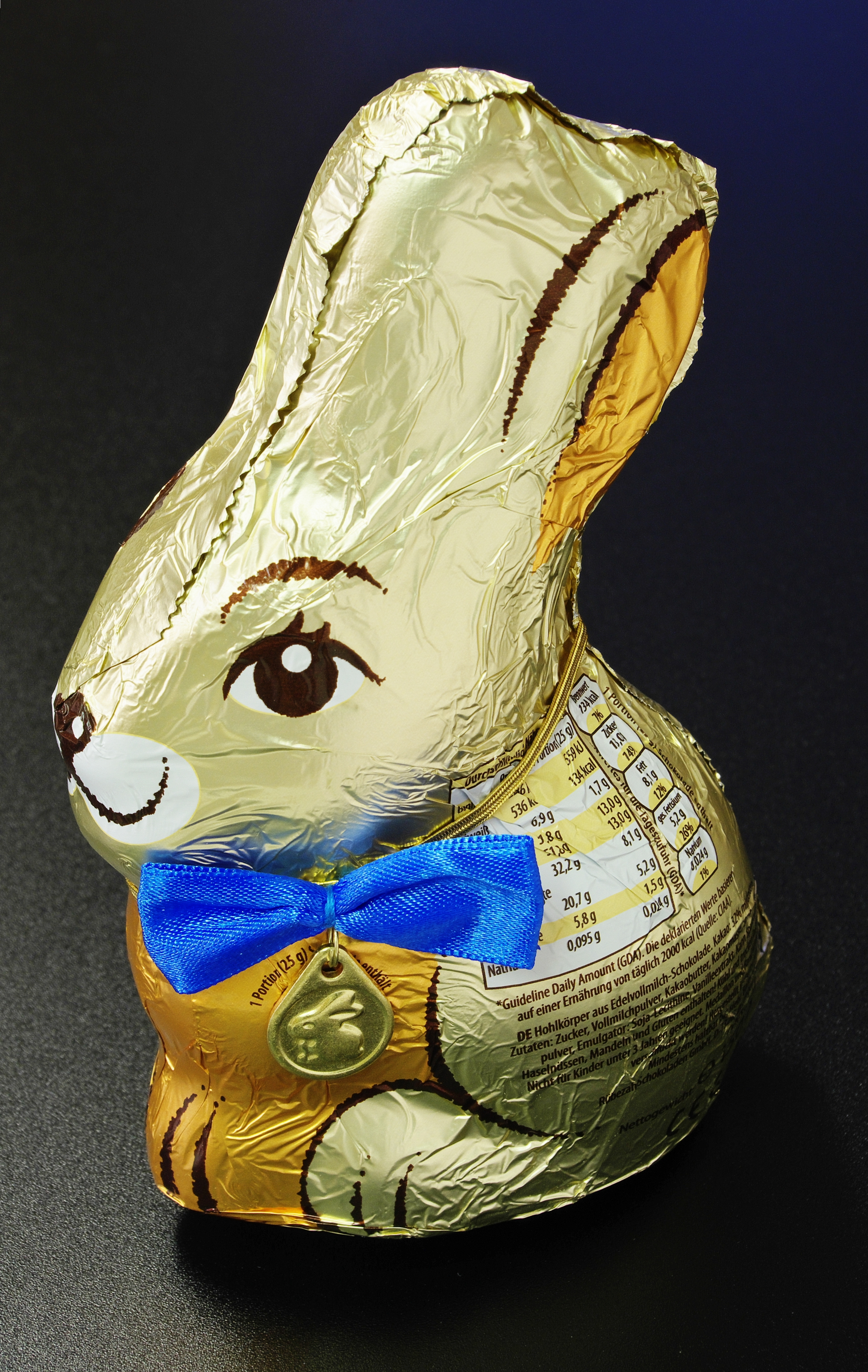
Chocolate Easter Bunny

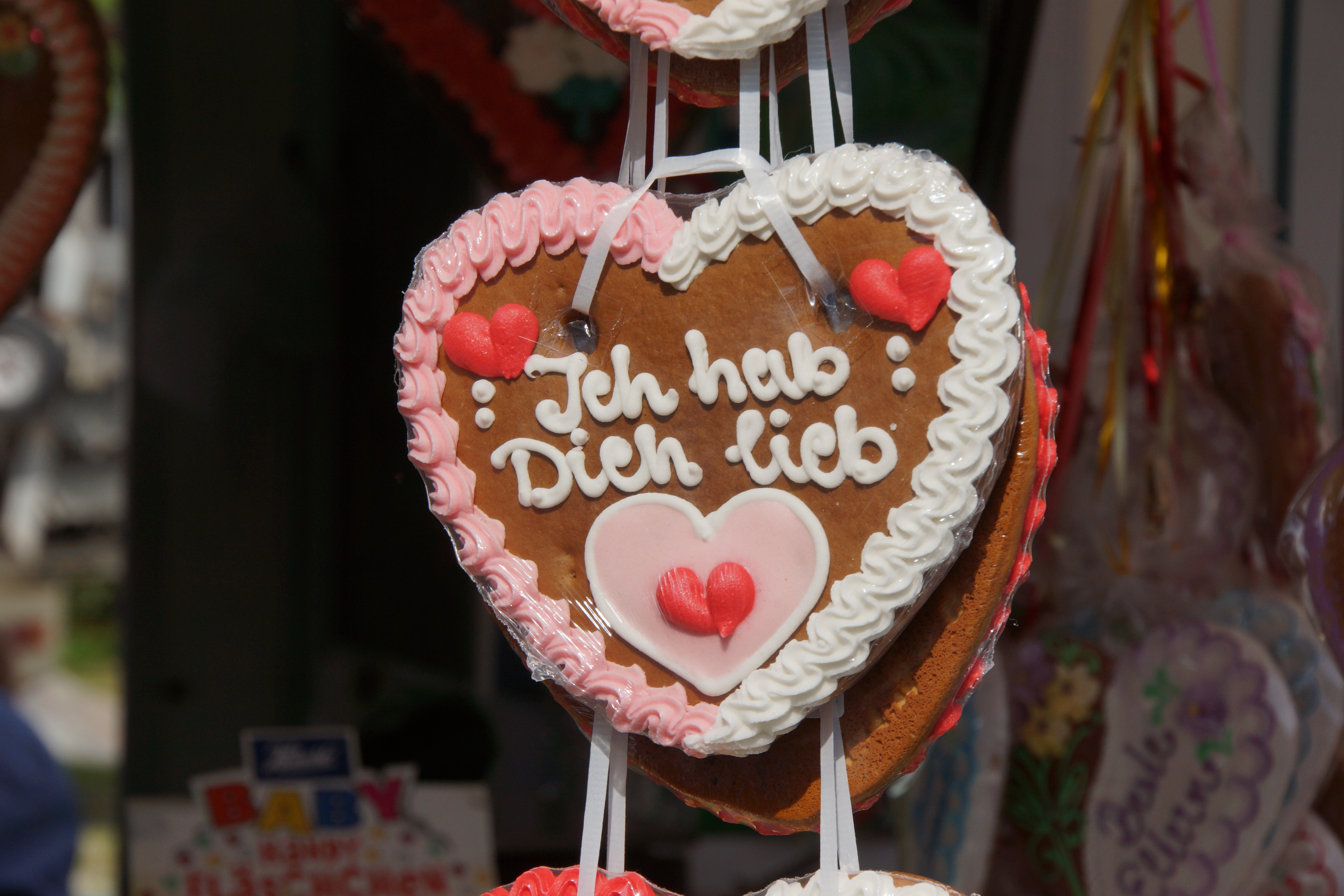
Oktoberfest Gingerbread

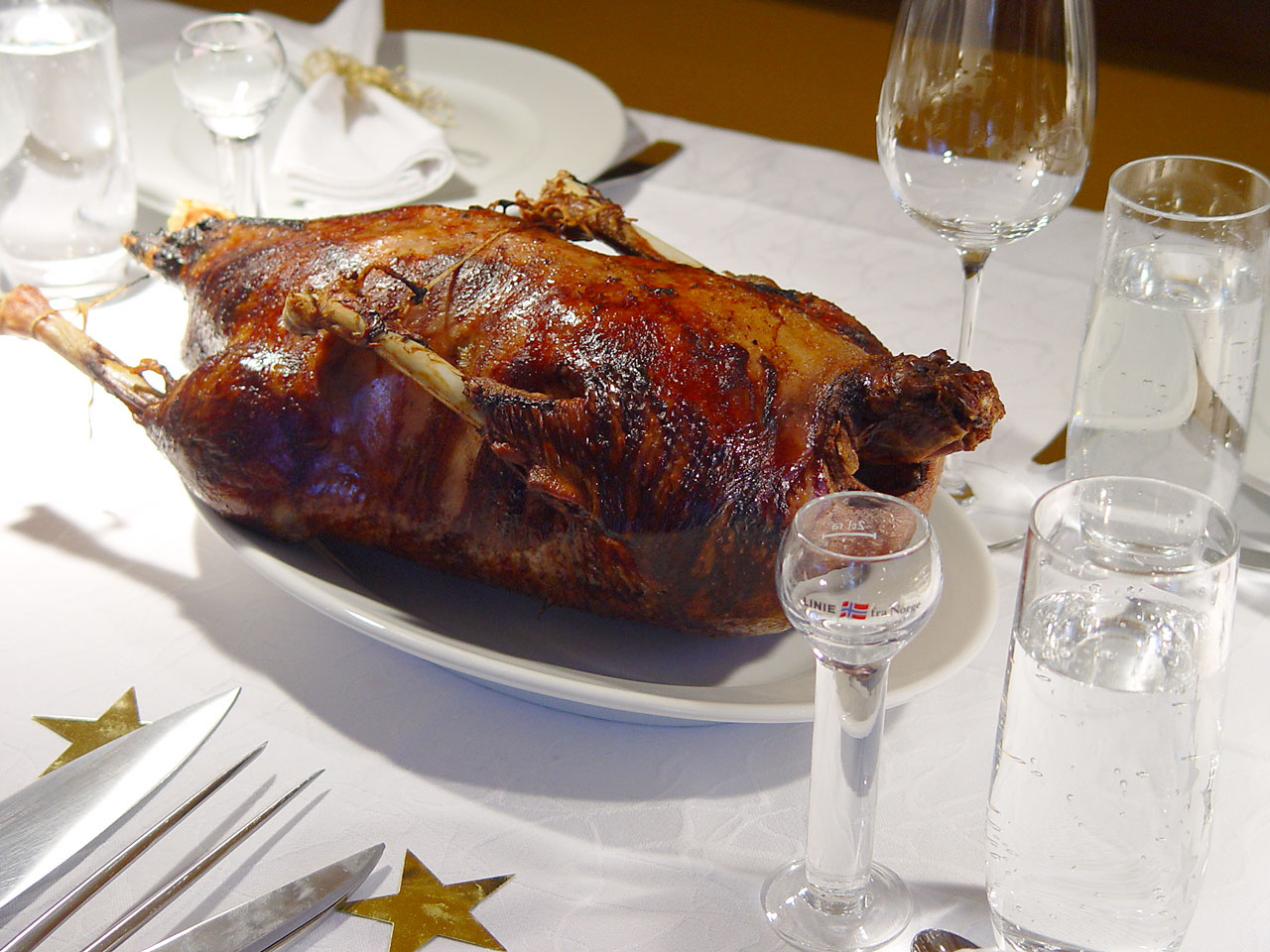
Roast Christmas goose

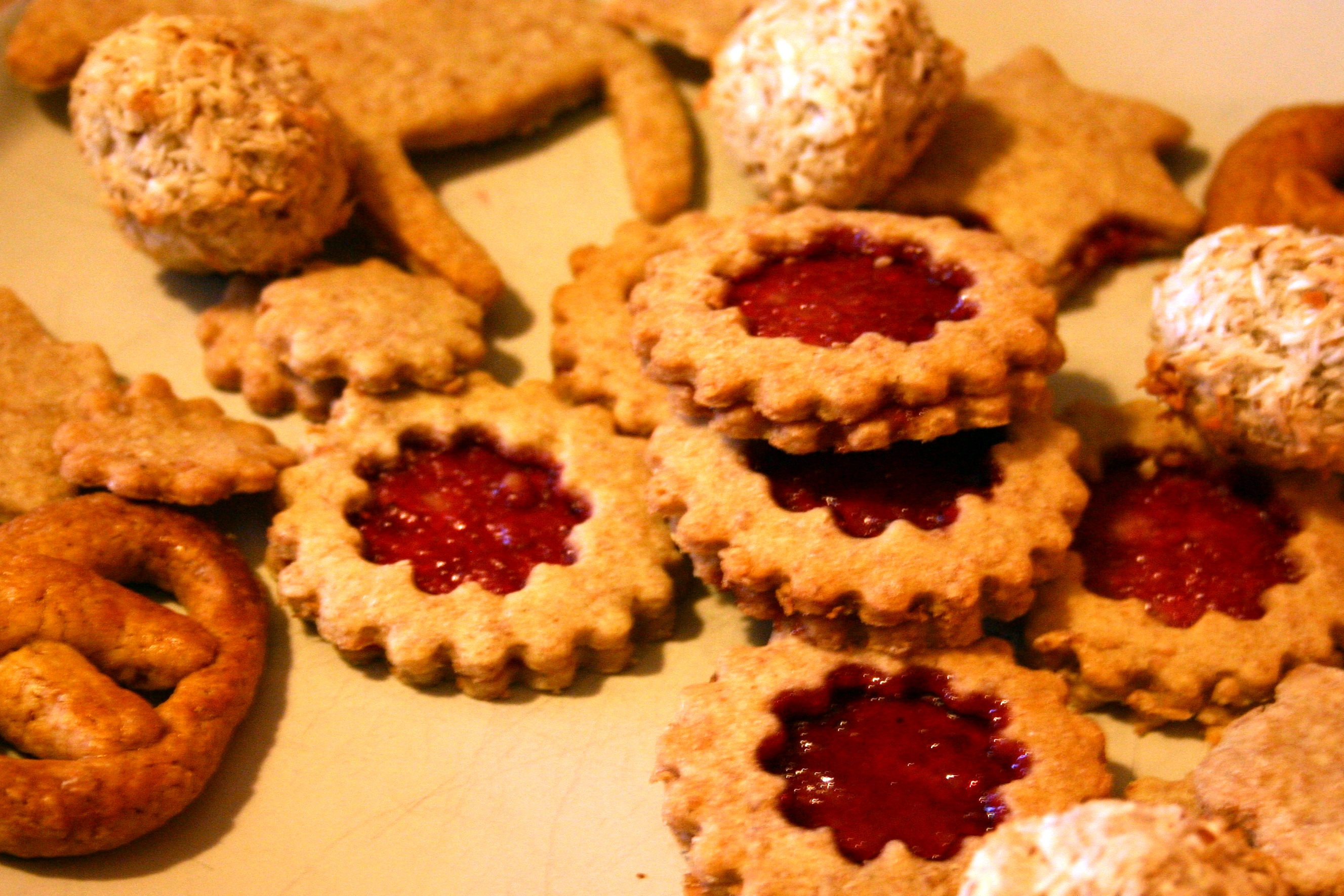
Christmas cookies

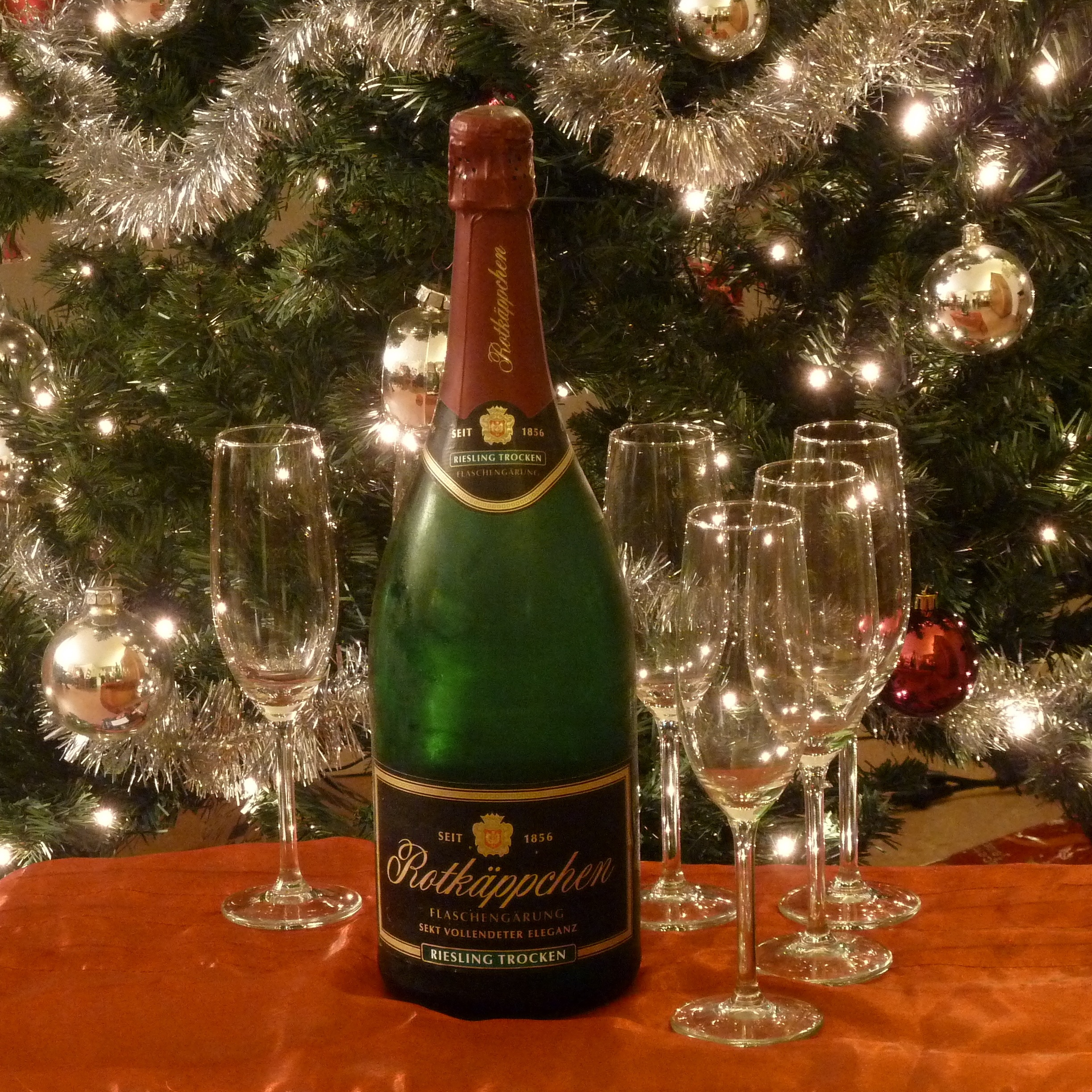
New Year Sekt

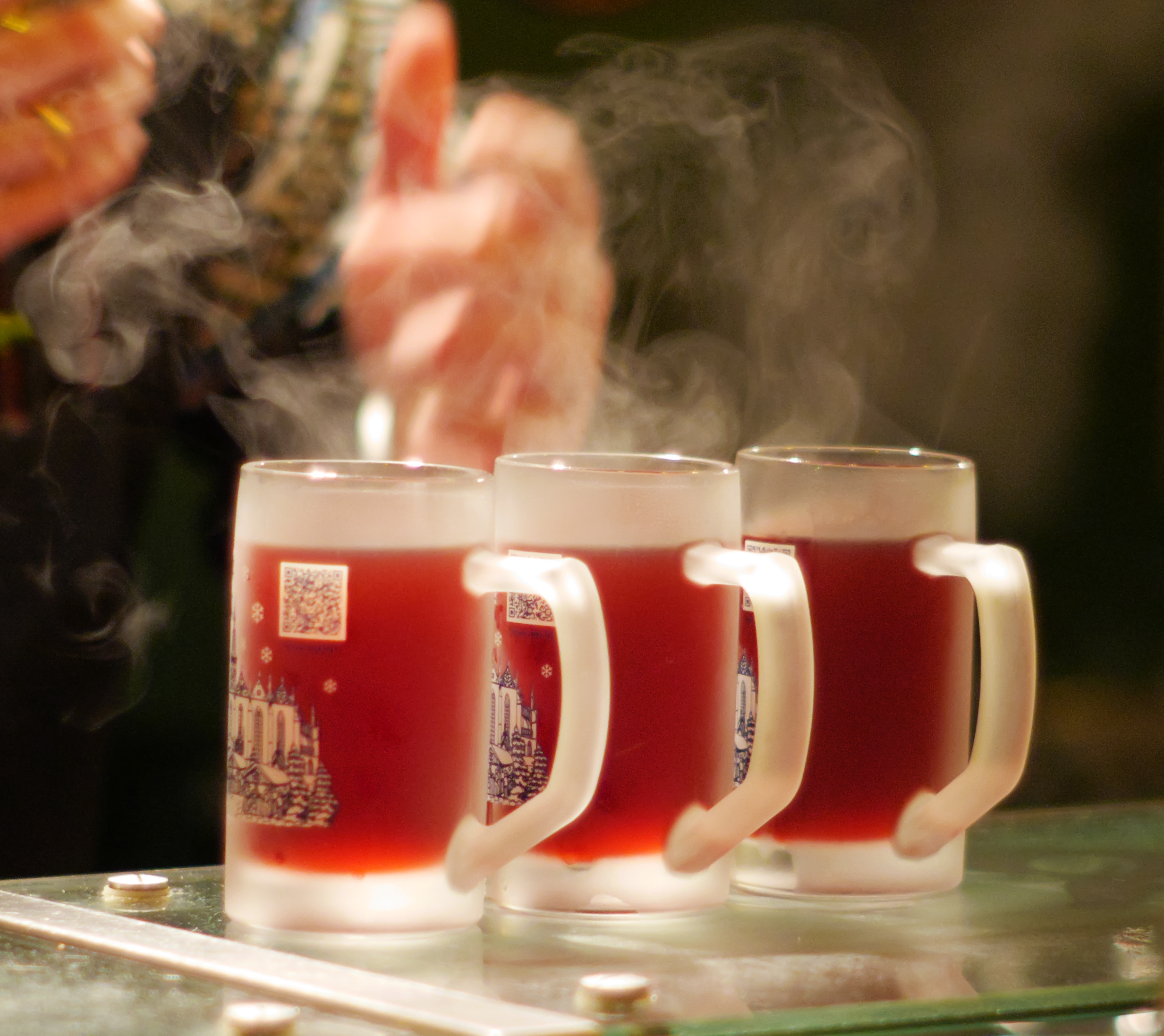
Mulled wine (German: Glühwein)

Apart from Christmas, nearly all other Christian holidays and seasons have special dishes associated with them, varying regionally and by denomination. The Easter season, for instance, is typically associated with painted Easter eggs, Osterbrot and a meal of freshwater fish on Good Friday. Likewise, Saint Sylvester's Day is often celebrated with a meal of carp. The fasting season, which lasts from Ash Wednesday to Easter Sunday, is observed in many areas, especially Catholic ones. The preceding carnival season is known for Berliner Pfannkuchen (German doughnuts). The last months of the year, especially the Advent and Christmas season, is often associated with Weihnachtsgebäck (literally Christmas bakery products), which includes sweet and spicy foods like Weihnachts-/Christstollen, Lebkuchen, Spekulatius, Marzipan, Weihnachtsplätzchen, Spritzgebäck, Vanillekipferl, Kokosmakronen, Zimtsterne and Dominosteine. German supermarkets also sell these products during this period. Another popular confectioneries are Crêpe, Reibekuchen and Eier-/Pfannkuchen, which are sold in Christmas markets.

== Bread ==
Bread (Brot) is a significant part of German cuisine, with the largest bread diversity in the world. Around 3,000 types of breads and 1,200 different types of pastries and rolls are produced in about 13,000 bakeries.

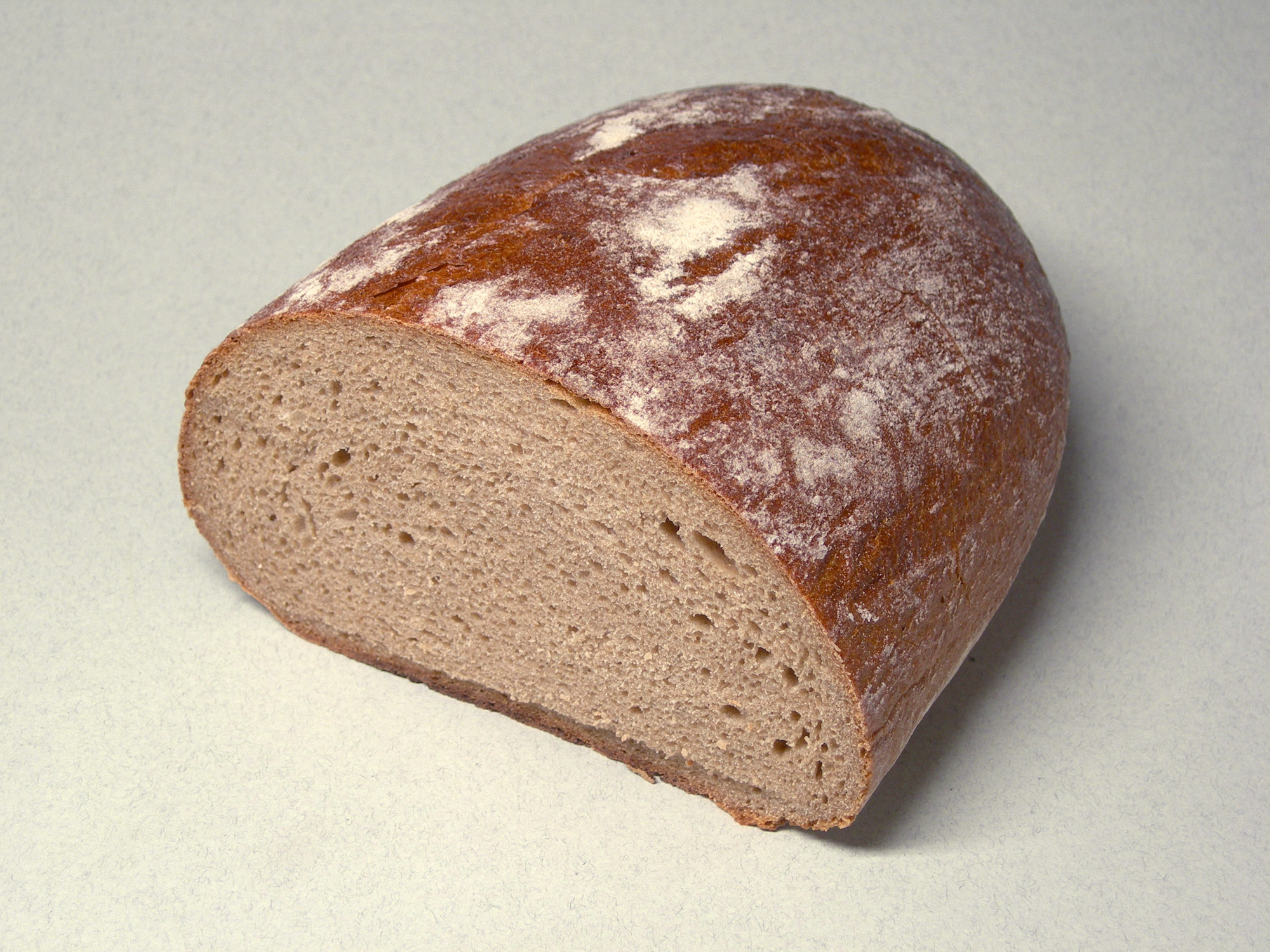
Roggenmischbrot, also known as Mischbrot for short, one of the most typical German breads

Bread is served usually for breakfast (often replaced by bread rolls) and in the evening as (open) sandwiches, but rarely as a side dish for the main meal (popular, for example, with Eintopf or soup). The importance of bread in German cuisine is also illustrated by words such as Abendbrot (meaning supper, literally evening bread) and Brotzeit (snack, literally bread time). In fact, one of the major complaints of the German expatriates in many parts of the world is their inability to find acceptable local breads.

Regarding bread, German cuisine is more varied than that of any other culture. Bread types range from white wheat bread (Weißbrot) to grey (Graubrot) to black (Schwarzbrot), actually dark brown rye bread. Some breads contain both wheat and rye flour (hence Mischbrot, mixed bread), and often also wholemeal and whole seeds such as linseed, sunflower seed, or pumpkin seed (Vollkornbrot). Darker, rye-dominated breads, such as Vollkornbrot or Schwarzbrot, are typical of German cuisine. Pumpernickel, sweet-tasting bread created by long-time-steaming instead of regular baking, is internationally well known, although not representative of German black bread as a whole. Most German breads are made with sourdough. Whole grain is also preferred for high fiber. Germans use almost all available types of grain for their breads: wheat, rye, barley, spelt, oats, millet, corn and rice. Some breads are even made with potato starch flour. Many breads are multigrain breads.

Among Germany's most popular breads are spelt (Dinkelbrot), rye (Roggenbrot), rye-wheat (Roggenmischbrot), wheat-rye (Weizenmischbrot), wheat (Weißbrot), toast (Toastbrot), whole-grain (Vollkornbrot), wheat-rye-oats with sesame or linseed (Mehrkornbrot), sunflower seeds in dark rye bread (Sonnenblumenkernbrot), pumpkin seeds in dark rye bread (Kürbiskernbrot), potato bread (Kartoffelbrot) and roasted onions in light wheat-rye bread (Zwiebelbrot).

=== Bread rolls ===
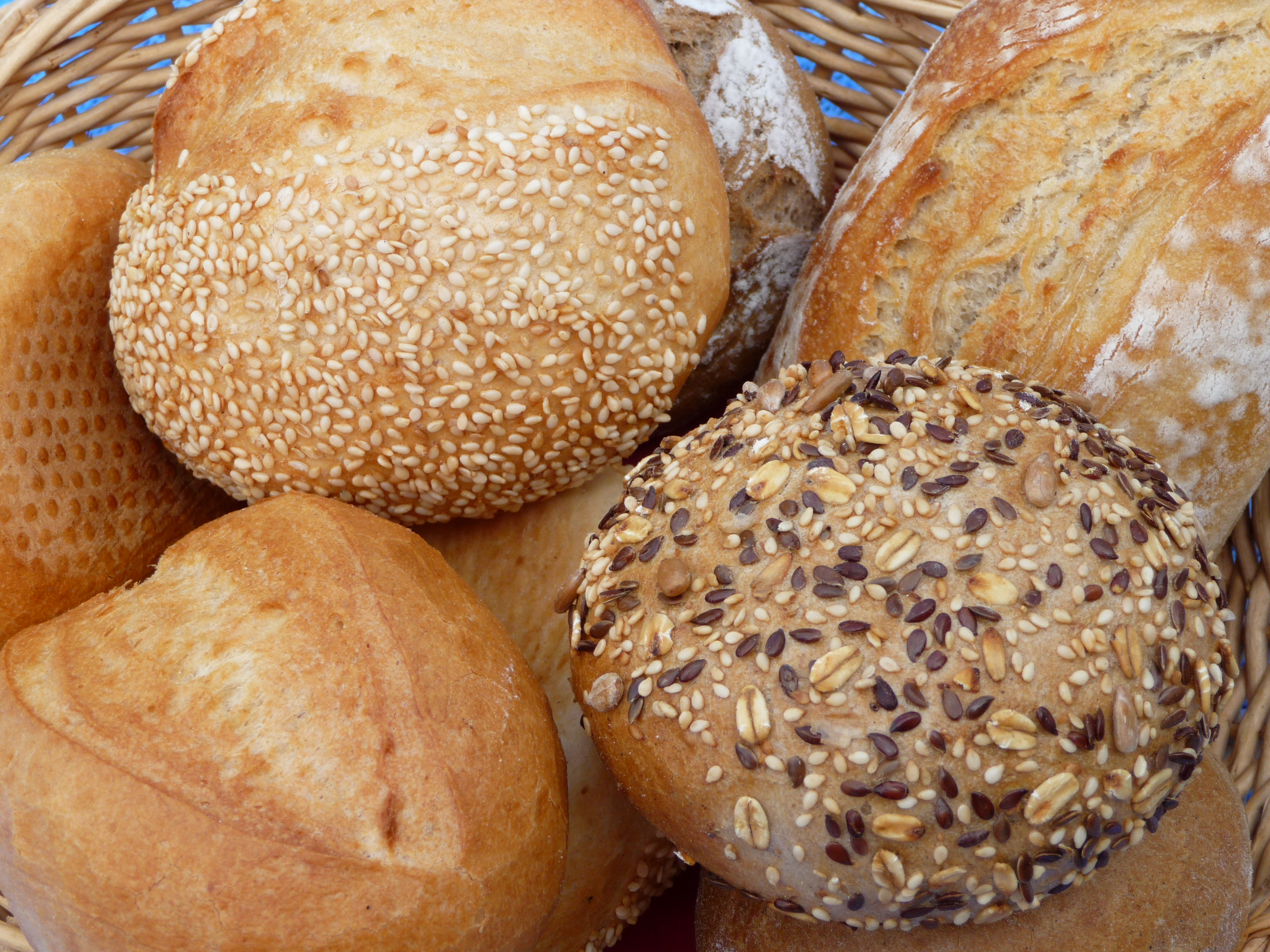
Assortment of German rolls

Bread rolls, known in Germany as Brötchen, which is a diminutive of Brot, with regional linguistic varieties being Semmel (in South Germany), Schrippe (especially in Berlin), Rundstück (in the North and Hamburg) or Wecken, Weck, Weckle, Weckli and Weckla (in Baden-Württemberg, Switzerland, parts of Southern Hesse and northern Bavaria), are common in German cuisine. A typical serving is a roll cut in half, and spread with butter or margarine. Cheese, honey, jam, Nutella, cold cuts such as ham, fish, or preserves are then placed between the two halves, or on each half separately, known as a belegtes Brötchen.

Rolls are also used for snacks, or as a hotdog-style roll for Bratwurst, Brätel, Fleischkäse or Schwenker/Schwenkbraten.

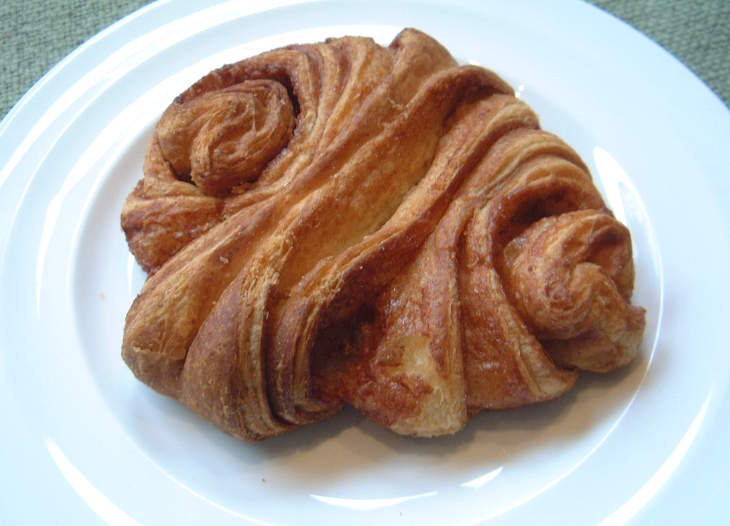
Franzbroetchen

Franzbrötchen, which originated in the area of Hamburg, is a small, sweet pastry roll baked with butter and cinnamon.

== Beverages ==
=== Alcoholic drinks ===
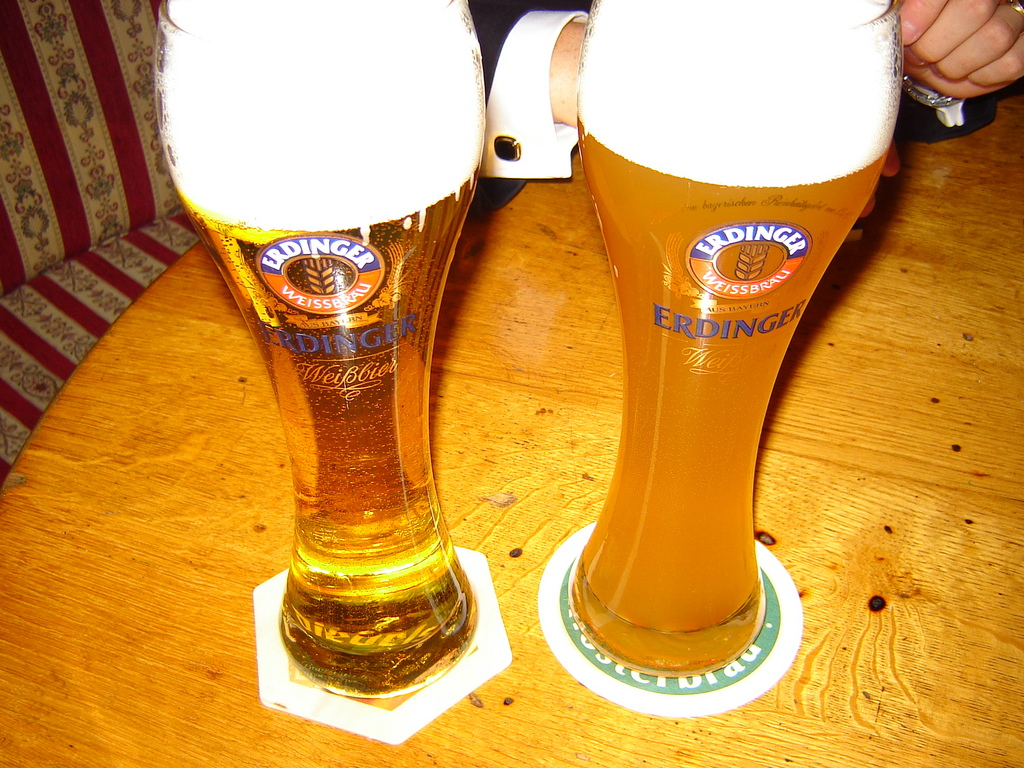
Two varieties of wheat beer: Kristallweizen (left) and Hefeweizen (right)

Beer is very common throughout all parts of Germany, with many local and regional breweries producing a wide variety of beers. The pale lager pilsner, a style developed in the mid-19th century, is predominant in most parts of the country today, whereas wheat beer (Weißbier/Weizen) and other types of lager are common, especially in Bavaria. A number of regions have local specialties, many of which, like Weißbier, are more traditionally brewed ales. Among these are Altbier, a dark beer available around Düsseldorf and the lower Rhine, Kölsch, a similar style, but light in color, in the Cologne area, and the low-alcohol Berliner Weiße, a sour beer made in Berlin that is often mixed with raspberry or woodruff syrup. Since the reunification of 1990, Schwarzbier, which was common in East Germany, but could hardly be found in West Germany, has become increasingly popular in Germany as a whole. Beer may also be mixed with other beverages such as pils or lager and carbonated lemonade: Radler (lit: cyclist), Alsterwasser (lit: water from the river Alster).

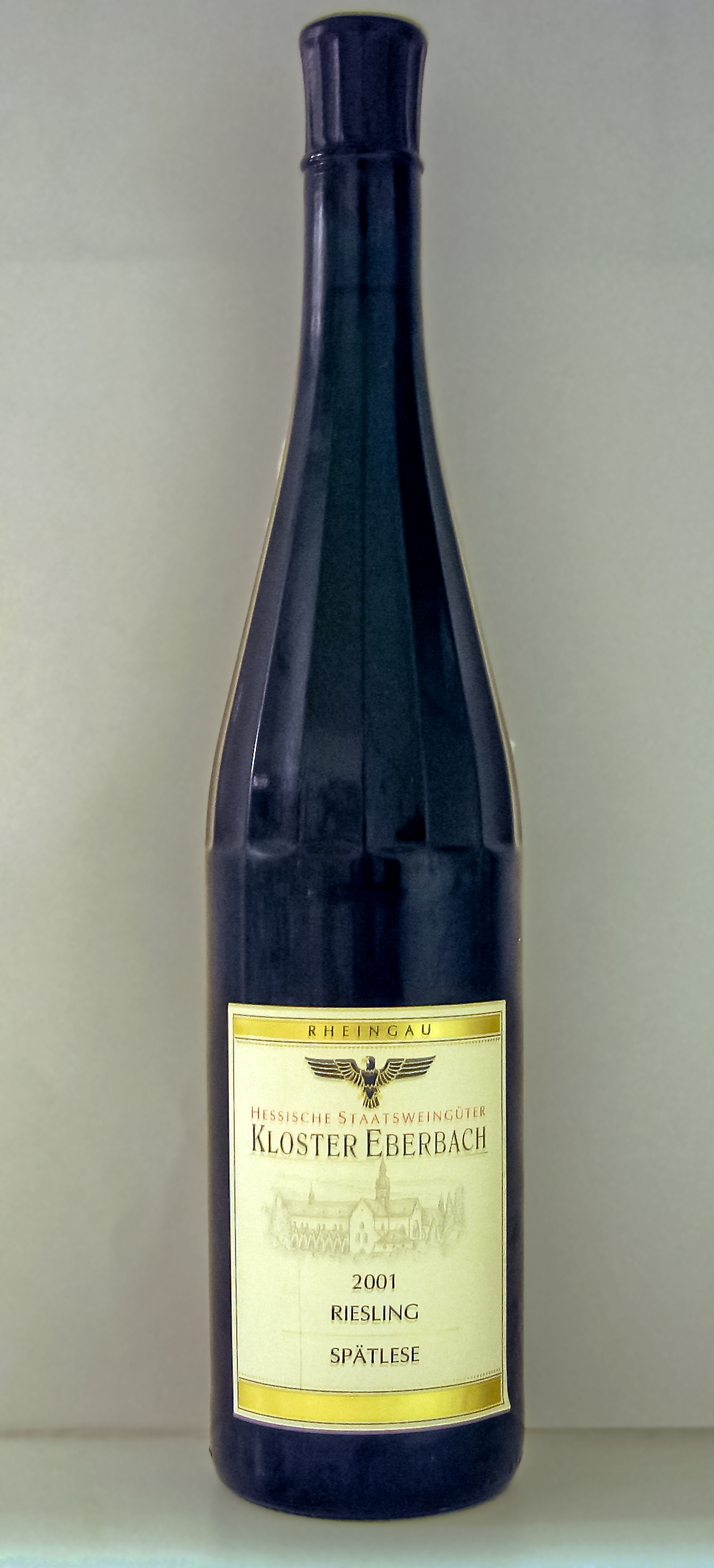
German Riesling Wine

Since a beer tax law was changed in 1993, many breweries served this trend of mixing beer with other drinks by selling bottles of pre-mixed beverages. Examples are Bibob (by Köstritzer), Veltins V+, Mixery (by Karlsberg), Dimix (by Diebels) and Cab (by Krombacher).

Cider is also popular in Germany. It is called Most or Ebbelwoi. In Hessen, people drink it from a traditional type of pitcher called a Bembel.

Wine is also popular throughout the country. German wine comes predominantly from the areas along the upper and middle Rhine and its tributaries. Riesling and Silvaner are among the best-known varieties of white wine, while Spätburgunder and Dornfelder are important German red wines. The sweet German wines sold in English-speaking countries seem mostly to cater to the foreign market, as they are rare in Germany.

Korn, a German spirit made from malted grain (wheat, rye, or barley), is consumed predominantly in the middle and northern parts of Germany. In southern Germany, fruit brandy ("Obstler") and Geist are more common. Obstler is distilled from fermented apples, pears, plums, cherries (Kirschwasser), quinces, or plums; Geist is distilled from unfermented fruit, vegetables, plants or nuts that have soaked in neutral spirits. The term Schnaps refers to "any kind of strong, dry spirit".

Bars and restaurants must serve beverages in glasses with a calibrated fill line, certified by a bureau of weights and measures (Eichamt), to ensure the guest is getting as much as is offered in the menu.

=== Non-alcoholic drinks ===
Coffee is very common, not only for breakfast, but also accompanying a piece of cake (Kaffee und Kuchen) in the afternoon, usually on Sundays or special occasions and birthdays. It is generally filter coffee, which is weaker than espresso. Coffeeshops are also very common in Germany. Tea is more common in the northwest. East Frisians traditionally have their tea with cream and rock candy (Kluntje). Germany has the tenth highest per capita coffee consumption worldwide.

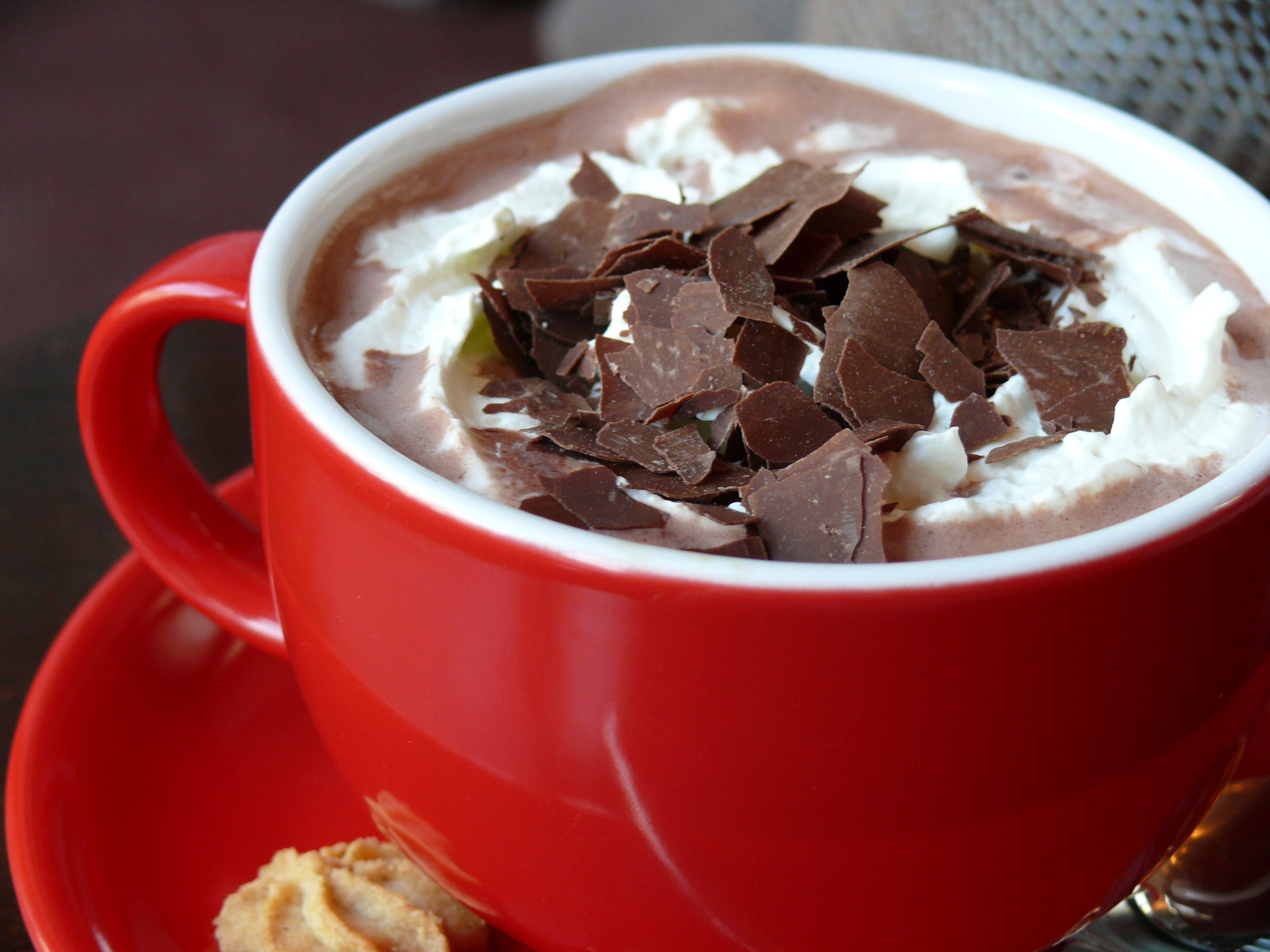
German hot chocolate served with whipped cream, chocolate shavings, and a small cookie

Hot chocolate (Heiße Schokolade, or Kakao) is also a very common beverage that is most commonly consumed in the days leading up to Christmas, where Schuss (schnapps, or liquor) can be added to the beverage. It also often gets served alongside pastries in restaurants, or to go throughout the year.

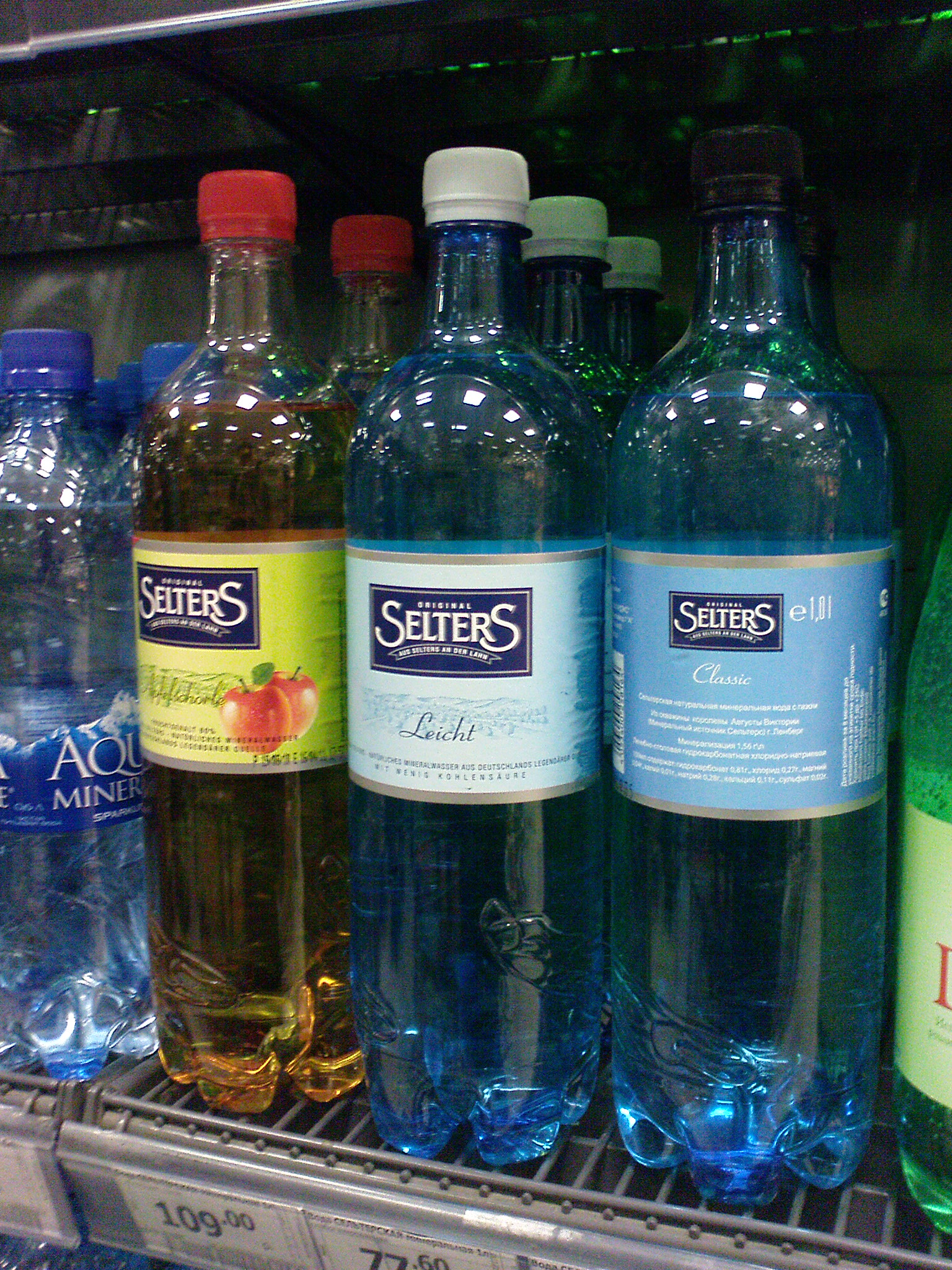
German Selters, a typical German carbonated mineral water

Johann Jacob Schweppe was a German-Swiss watchmaker and amateur scientist, who developed the first practical process to manufacture bottled carbonated mineral water and began selling the world's first soft drink under his company Schweppes. Popular soft drinks include Schorle, juice or wine mixed with sparkling mineral water, with Apfelschorle being popular all over Germany, and Spezi, made with cola and an orange-flavored drink such as Fanta. Germans are unique among their neighbors in preferring bottled, carbonated mineral water, either plain (Sprudel) or flavored (usually lemon) to noncarbonated ones.

Drinking water of excellent quality is available everywhere and at any time in Germany. Water provided by the public water utilities can be had without hesitation directly from the tap. Usually, no chlorine is added. Drinking water is controlled by state authority to ensure it is potable. Regulations are even stricter than those for bottled water (see Trinkwasserverordnung).

== Regional cuisine ==
German regional cuisine can be divided into many varieties such as Bavarian cuisine (southern Germany) or Thuringian (central Germany) and Lower Saxon cuisine (northern Germany).

=== Baden-Württemberg ===
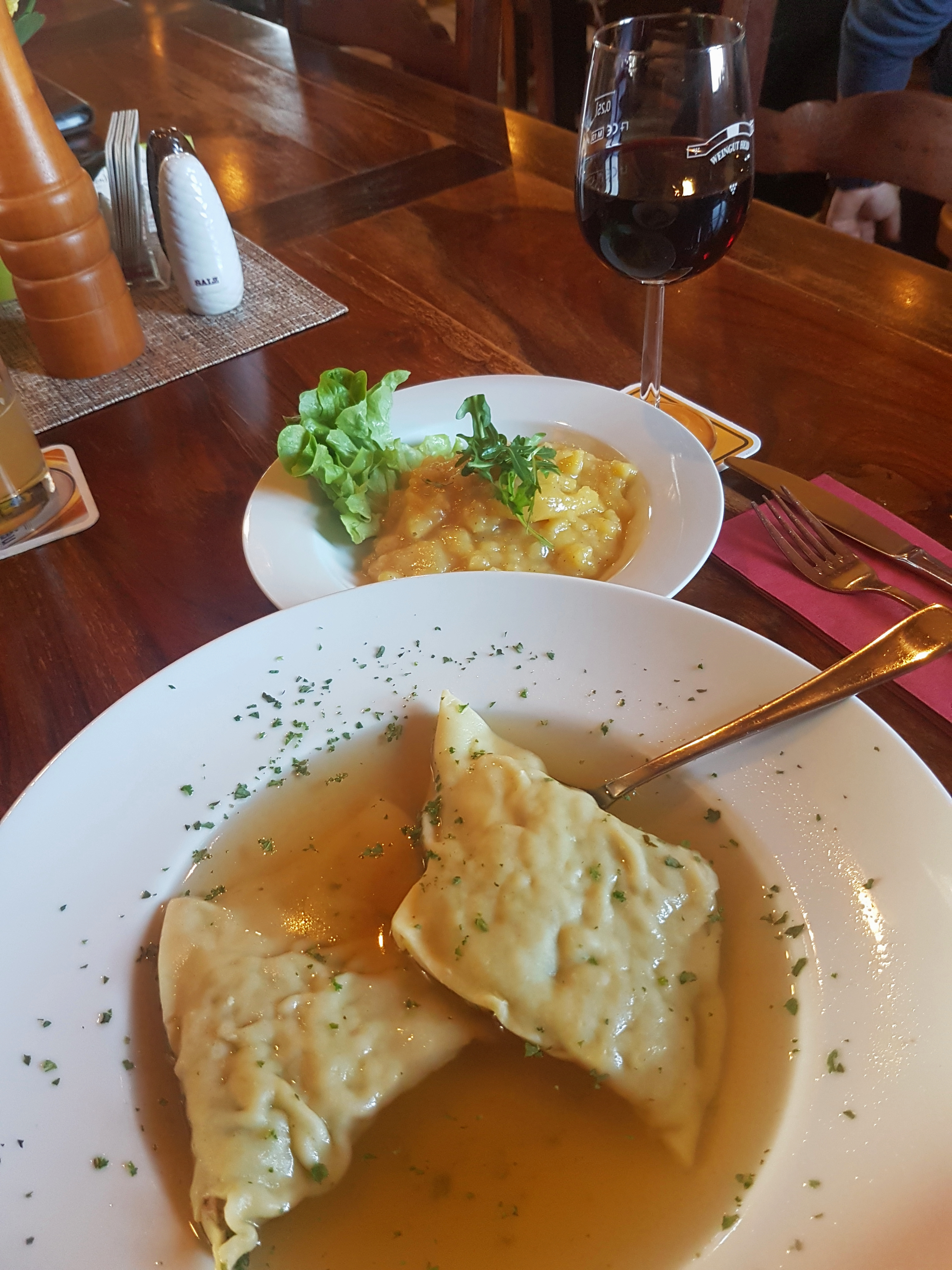
Maultaschen

This southwest German state is divided into Baden and Swabia, whose cuisines are slightly different. Due to Baden's physiogeographical situation in the Upper Rhine Plain, with Germany's warmest climate and fruitful volcanic soils, it had good prerequisites to develop a high-quality gastronomy. Nationwide, this region features the highest density of star-rated restaurants; the municipality of Baiersbronn is especially well known for its fine-dining restaurants. Swabian cuisine tends to be heavier than Badish cuisine. Famous dishes of Baden-Württemberg are Maultaschen, Spätzle and Black Forest cake.

=== Bavaria ===
The Bavarian dukes, especially the Wittelsbach family, developed Bavarian cuisine and refined it to be presentable to the royal court. This cuisine has belonged to wealthy households, especially in cities, since the 19th century. The (old) Bavarian cuisine is closely connected to Czech cuisine and Austrian cuisine (especially from Tyrol and Salzburg), mainly through the Wittelsbach and Habsburg families. Already in the beginning, Bavarians were closely connected to their neighbours in Austria through linguistic, cultural and political similarities, which also reflected on the cuisine.

A characteristic Bavarian cuisine was further developed by both groups, with a distinct similarity to Franconian and Swabian cuisine. A Bavarian speciality is the Brotzeit, a savoury snack, which would originally be eaten between breakfast and lunch.

Bavaria is a part of Southeastern Germany, including the city of Munich and spreading to Germany's borders with Austria and the Czech Republic. The region is located at higher elevations, and is known for yielding beet and potato crops and also for the production of fine beers.

=== Berlin ===
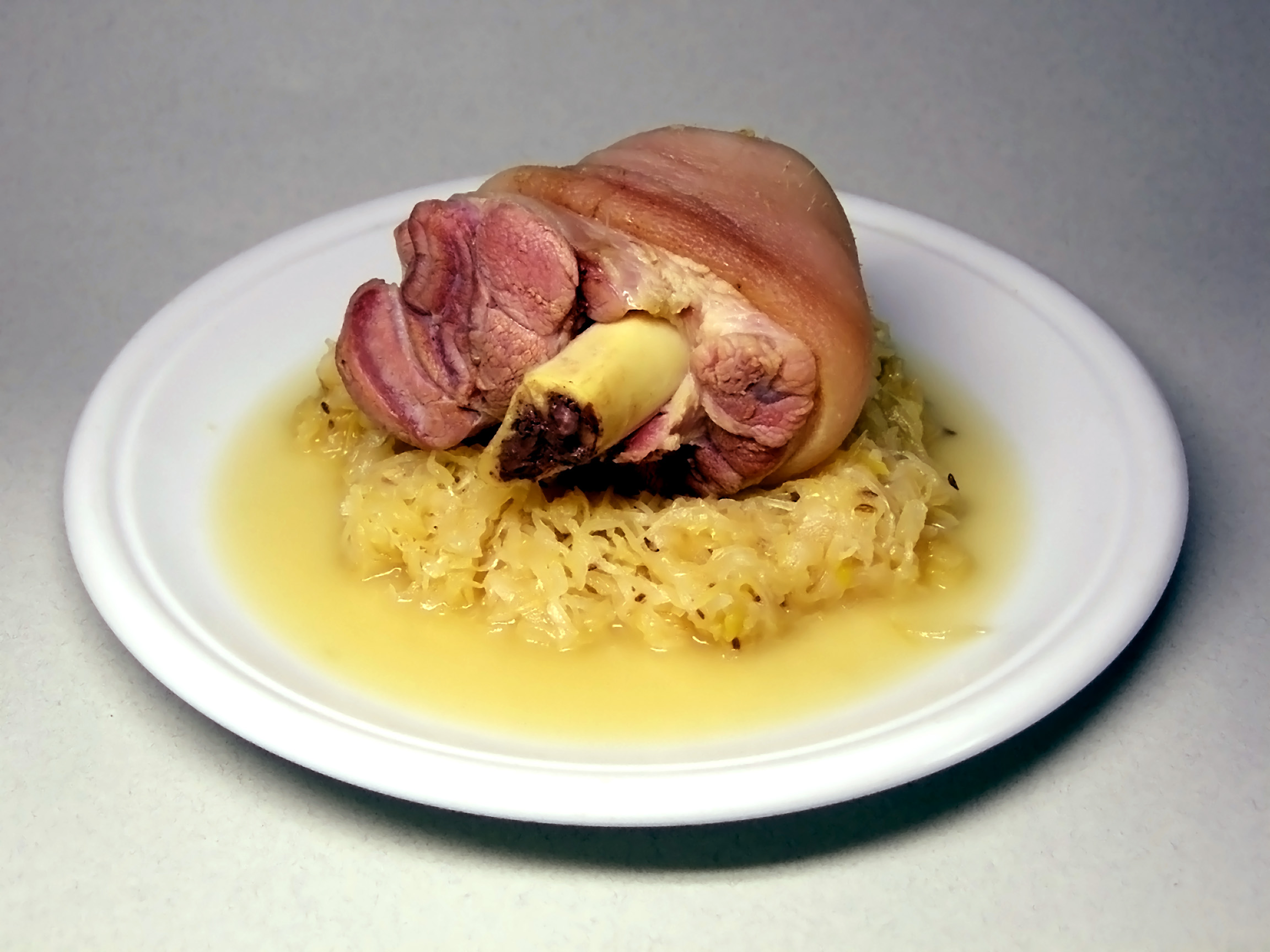
Eisbein, with Sauerkraut, among the favorite dishes around the world.

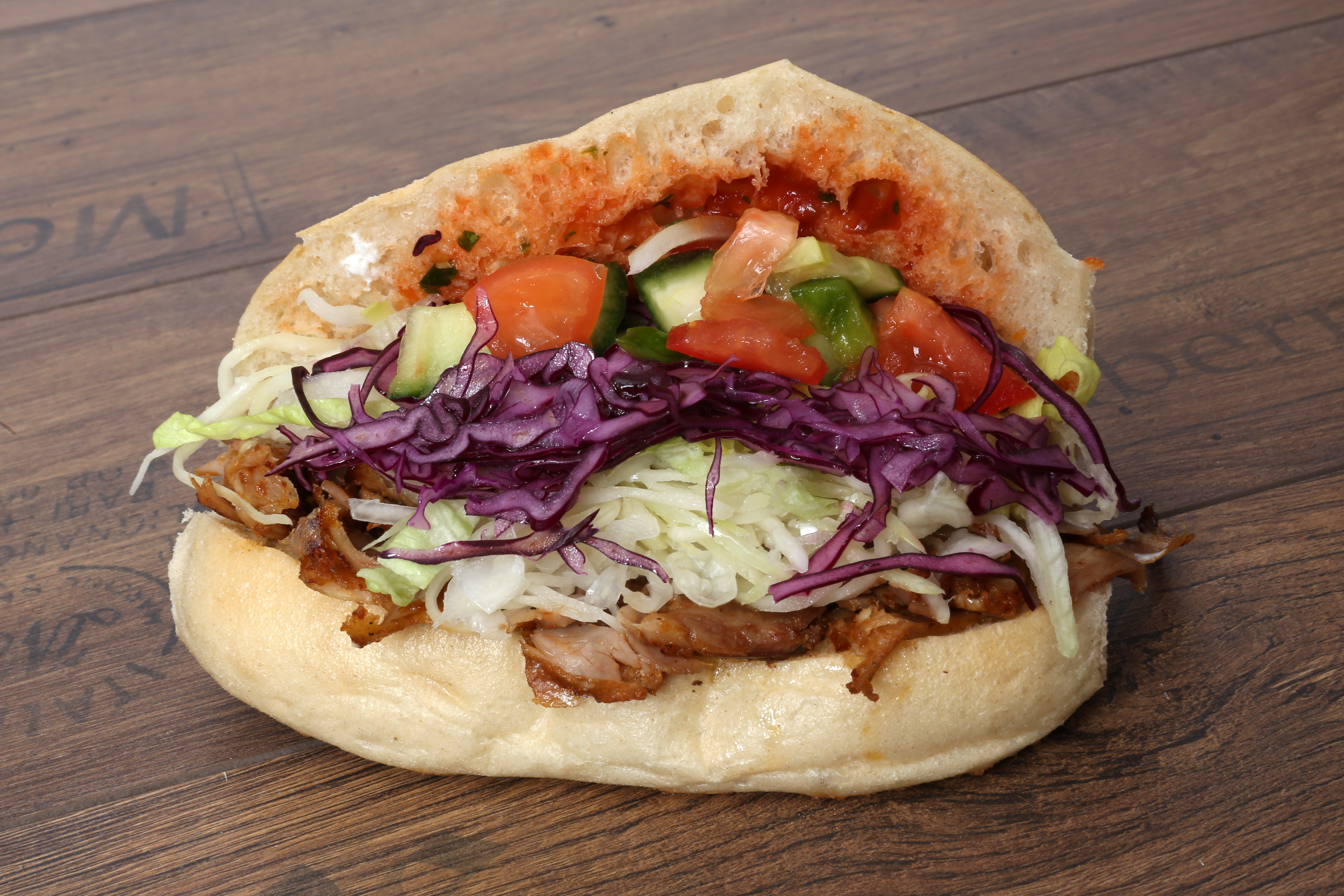
The modern sandwich variant of Döner kebab originated and was popularized in 1970s West Berlin by Turkish immigrants.

Berlin's cuisine reflects its multicultural charm, combining traditional German dishes with global influences. Iconic meals include Currywurst (sausage with curry ketchup), Döner kebab (Turkish-inspired fast food), Königsberger Klopse, and Eisbein, a hearty dish of pickled pork knuckle often served with sauerkraut and potatoes. Schnitzel is also popular, along with Berliner pfannkuchen, a jam-filled pastry. The city embraces vegetarian and vegan cuisine, with a variety of plant-based options available. Street food is a key part of Berlin's food culture, offering everything from falafel to craft beer. Overall, Berlin's cuisine offers a rich blend of comforting and diverse flavors.

=== Franconia ===
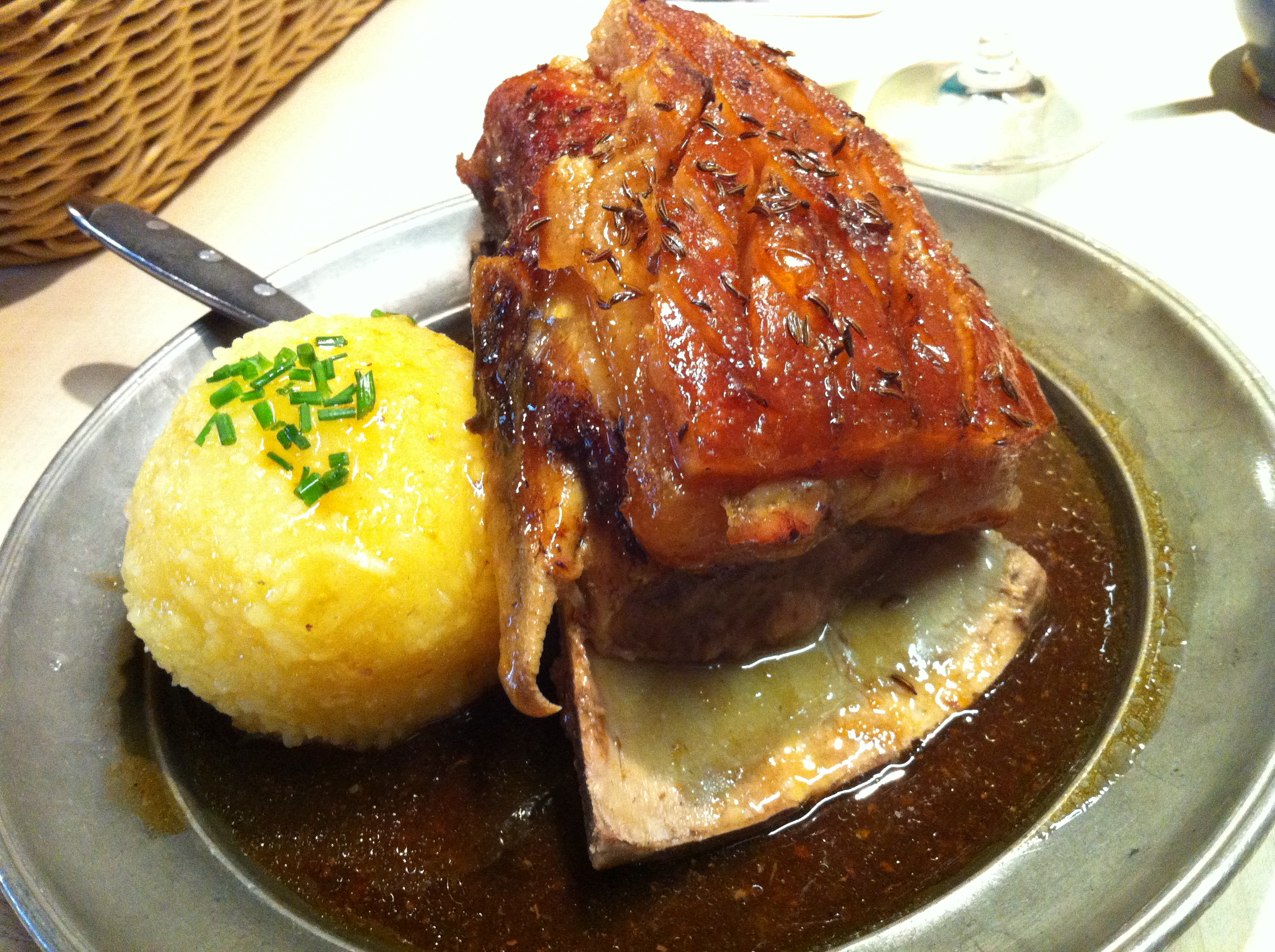
Schäufele und Klöße

Franconia, a major region consisting roughly of the northern half of Bavaria, has its own distinct cuisine, so distinct in fact that there is said to be a "White Sausage Equator" (Weißwurstäquator) that separates Franconia from the rest of Bavaria. This is a reference to the fact that those north of the Weißwurstequator do not generally eat the popular Weißwurst common in southern Bavaria. A characteristic of Franconian food would include gravies (Soßen), food derived from potatoes, various meats, and, of course, bread. Franconia is well known throughout Germany for its heavy foods covered in gravy. A good example of Franconian food would be Schäufele and Klöße, which is a pork shoulder served with traditional potato dumplings (Klöße or Knödel) covered in a gravy.

=== Hamburg ===
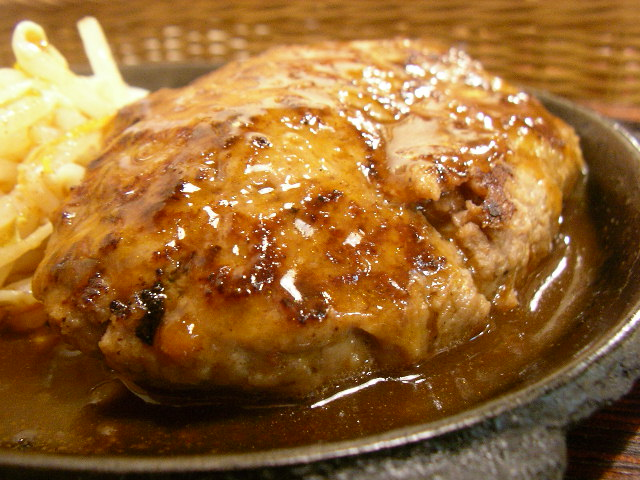
Hamburg steak has been known as "Frikadelle" in Germany since the 17th century and is believed to be a precursor to the modern Hamburger.

Due to its centuries-old history as a harbour town, the traditional cuisine of Hamburg is very diversified and sapid as the supply of ingredients was safe. Until the 20th century, it was predominantly characterized by the extensive choice of different kinds of fish from the river Elbe and the quick access to both the North Sea and the Baltic Sea, both being roughly 100 kilometers away from the city center. The neighboring regions supplied the city state with fresh vegetables, fruit came mainly from a region called Altes Land just southwest of Hamburg and until industrialization, the neighbourhood of Wilhelmsburg was considered the ‘milk isle’ of Hamburg.

International trade made spices and exotic food items from Asia and South America available since the 16th century, and these were soon incorporated into civic kitchens. From this basis, the cuisine of Hamburg developed its current characteristics thanks to the supraregional harmonization of the Northern German and Scandinavian cuisine. Due to its high economic importance, Hamburg features many internationally recognized gourmet restaurants: 11 of them were awarded a Michelin star in 2010.

=== Lower Saxony ===
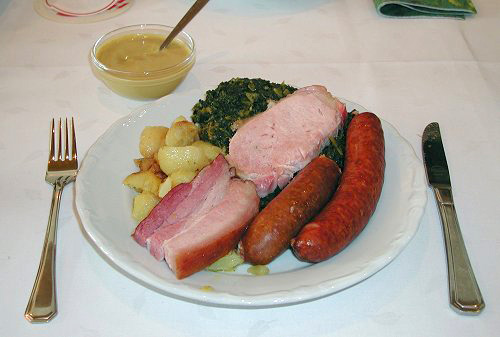
Grünkohl dish with Pinkel, Kassler and Speck

Lower Saxon cuisine (German: Niedersächsische Küche) covers a range of regional, North German culinary traditions from the region correspondingly broadly to the state of Lower Saxony, which in many cases are very similar to one another, for example cuisine from the areas of Oldenburg, Brunswick, or East Frisia.

It is mainly indigenous and in some cases very hearty, with many cultural dishes including poultry, venison, turkey, and vegetables. Many other recipes also include potatoes, asparagus and North Sea fish, all of which are harvested in the region.

=== Pomerania ===
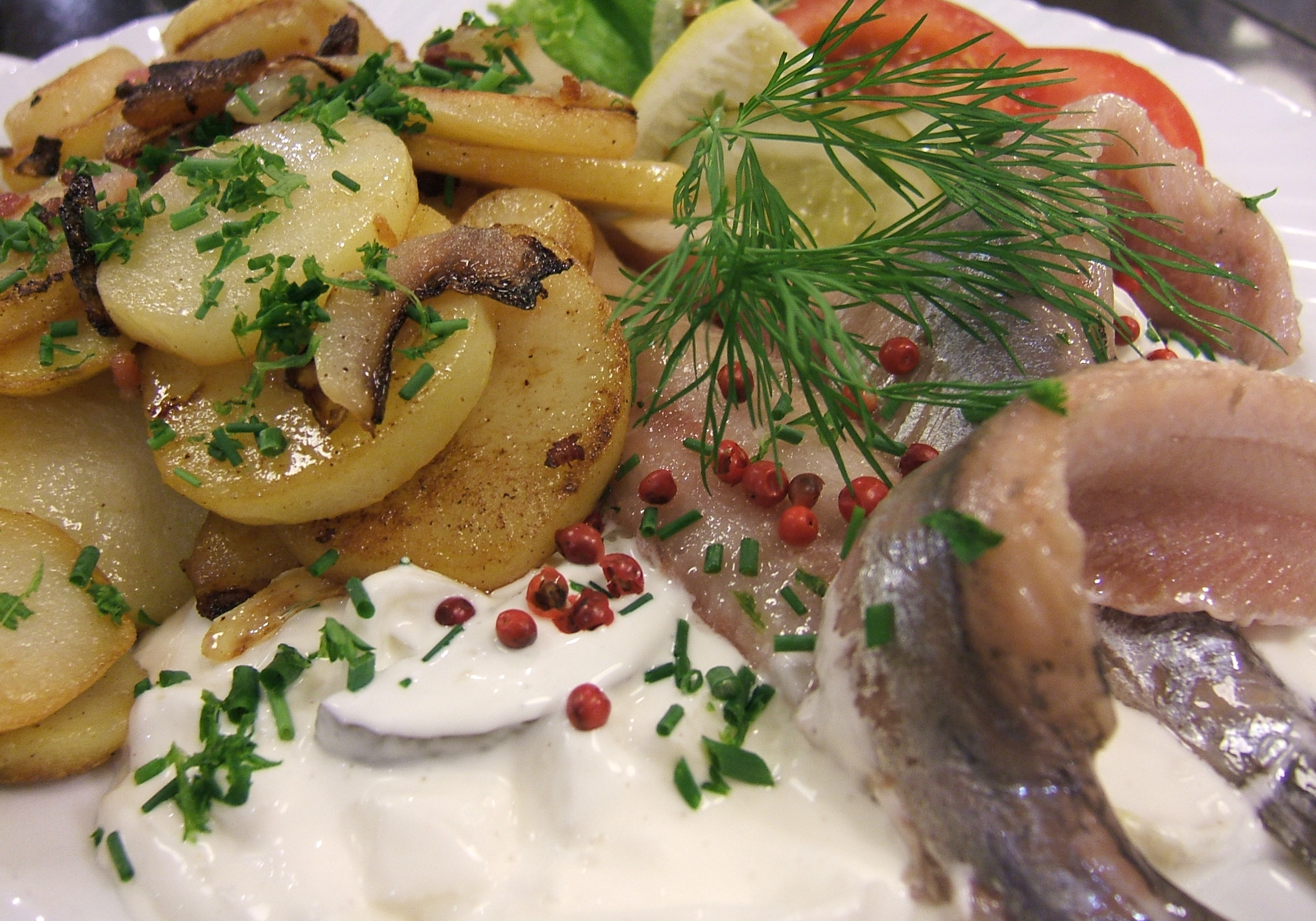
Pomeranian cuisine is famous for its great variety of fish dishes, such as Sahnehering.

Pomeranian cuisine generally refers to dishes typical of the area that once formed the historic Province of Pomerania in northeast Germany and which included Stettin (now Szczecin) and Further Pomerania. It is characterised by ingredients produced by Pomeranian farms, such as swede (Wruken) and sugar beet, by poultry rearing, which has produced the famous Pomeranian goose, by the wealth of fish in the Baltic Sea, rivers and inland lakes of the Pomeranian Lake District, and the abundance of quarry in Pomeranian forests. Pomeranian cuisine is hearty. Several foodstuffs have a particularly important role to play here in the region: potatoes, known as Tüften, prepared in various ways and whose significance is evinced by the existence of a West Pomeranian Potato Museum (Vorpommersches Kartoffelmuseum), Grünkohl and sweet and sour dishes produced, for example, by baking fruit.

Pomeranian farmers were self-sufficient: crops were stored until the following harvest, meat products were preserved in the smoke store of the home, or in the smokeries of larger villages such as Schlawin. Fruit, vegetables, lard and Gänseflomen were preserved by bottling in jars. Syrup was made from the sugar beet itself.

=== Hessen ===
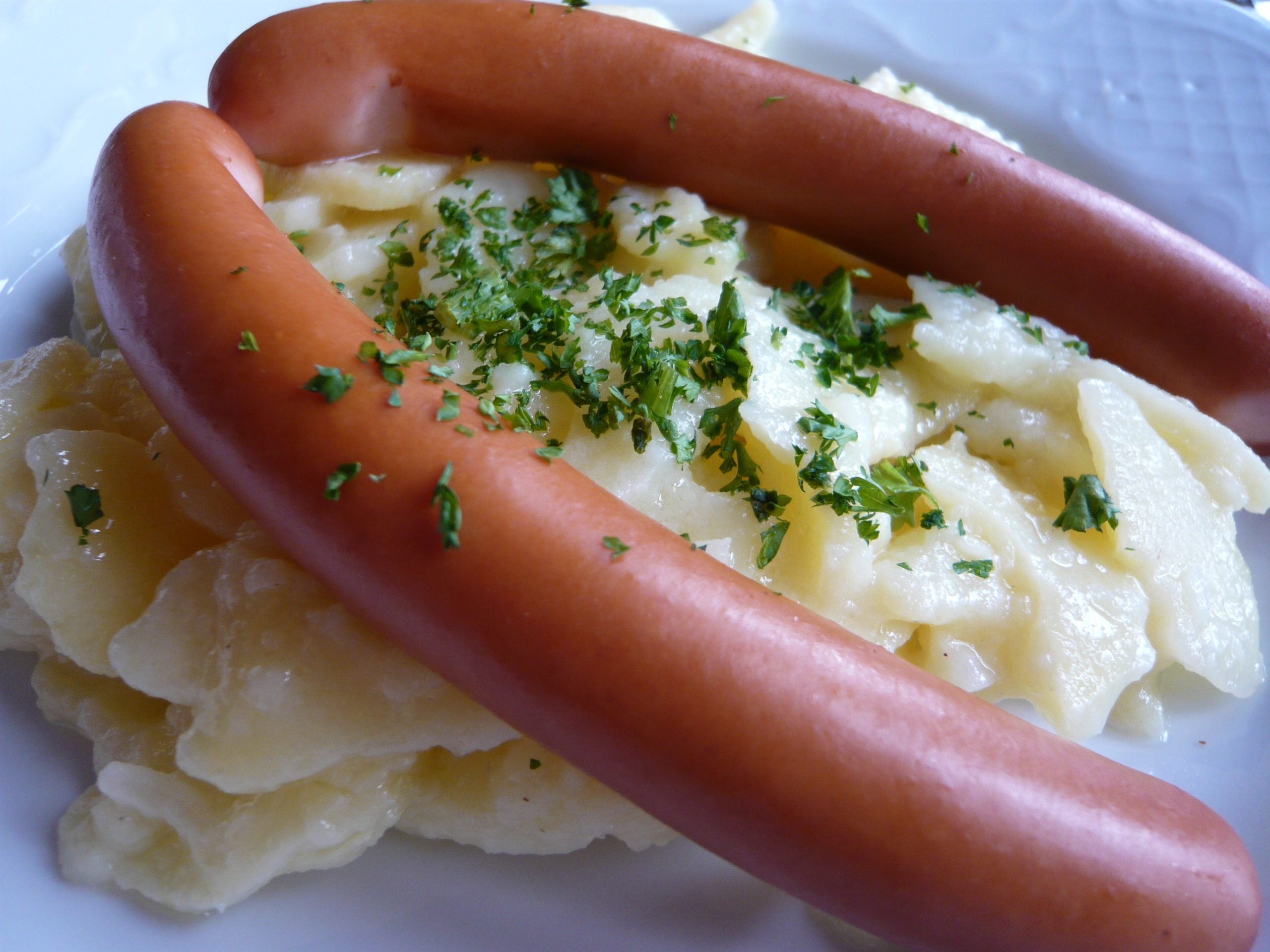
Original Frankfurter Würstchen, origin of hot dogs, served with potato salad

Typical for Hessen are Frankfurter Rippchen, a spiked pork cutlet, which is often served with sauerkraut and mashed potatoes.

Also from Hessen comes the Frankfurt green sauce ("Grüne Sauce"). It is a cold sauce based on sour cream with the local herbs borage, chervil, cress, parsley, pimpinelle, sorrel and chives. The start of the season is traditionally Maundy Thursday ("Gründonnerstag"; which means "green Thursday" in German). Green sauce is mostly served with potatoes and boiled eggs.

One of the best-known specialties from Hesse is the Frankfurter Kranz, a buttercream cake whose shape is reminiscent of a crown, a reminiscence of Frankfurt as the historical coronation city of the German emperors.

Cider ("Apfelwein" in German, or "Äppelwoi" in the Hessian dialect) is also very popular in and around Frankfurt. In the historic district Sachsenhausen there is the so-called Cider Quarter ("Äppelwoiviertel"), where there are numerous taverns that offer cider, especially in the summer months. In the cider taverns, "Handkäs mit Musik" is offered as a snack, a sour milk cheese served in a marinade of onions, vinegar and spices.

=== Palatinate/Pfalz ===
The kitchen of the Palatinate, a region in the south of Rhineland-Palatinate, is largely determined by regional dishes. They are sometimes quite hearty, not least because the cooking recipes were sometimes developed in times of need or in the context of heavy physical work.

Probably the best-known dish is the Pfälzer Saumagen, a pork stomach stuffed with sausage meat, bacon, potatoes and spices. The dish became famous as the favorite meal of Federal Chancellor Helmut Kohl, who especially enjoyed serving this dish at state receptions.

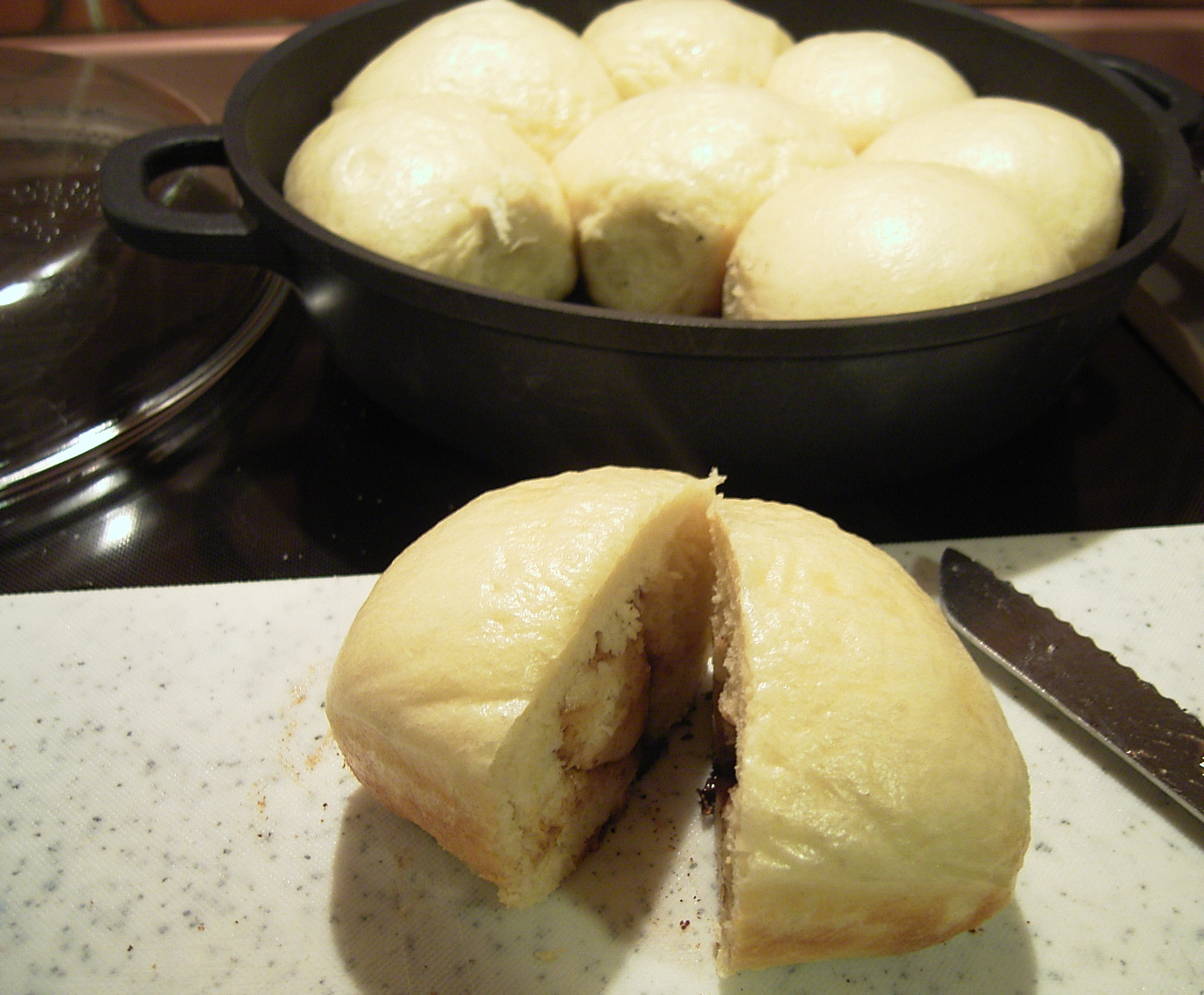
Dampfnudel

In the Palatinate, the salty-crust Dampfnudel is a traditional main dish, either with sweet side dishes (for example wine sauce, custard or boiled fruit such as plums, pears or the like) or with salty side dishes (for example potato soup, vegetable soups, goulash or pork) is eaten.

=== Thuringia ===
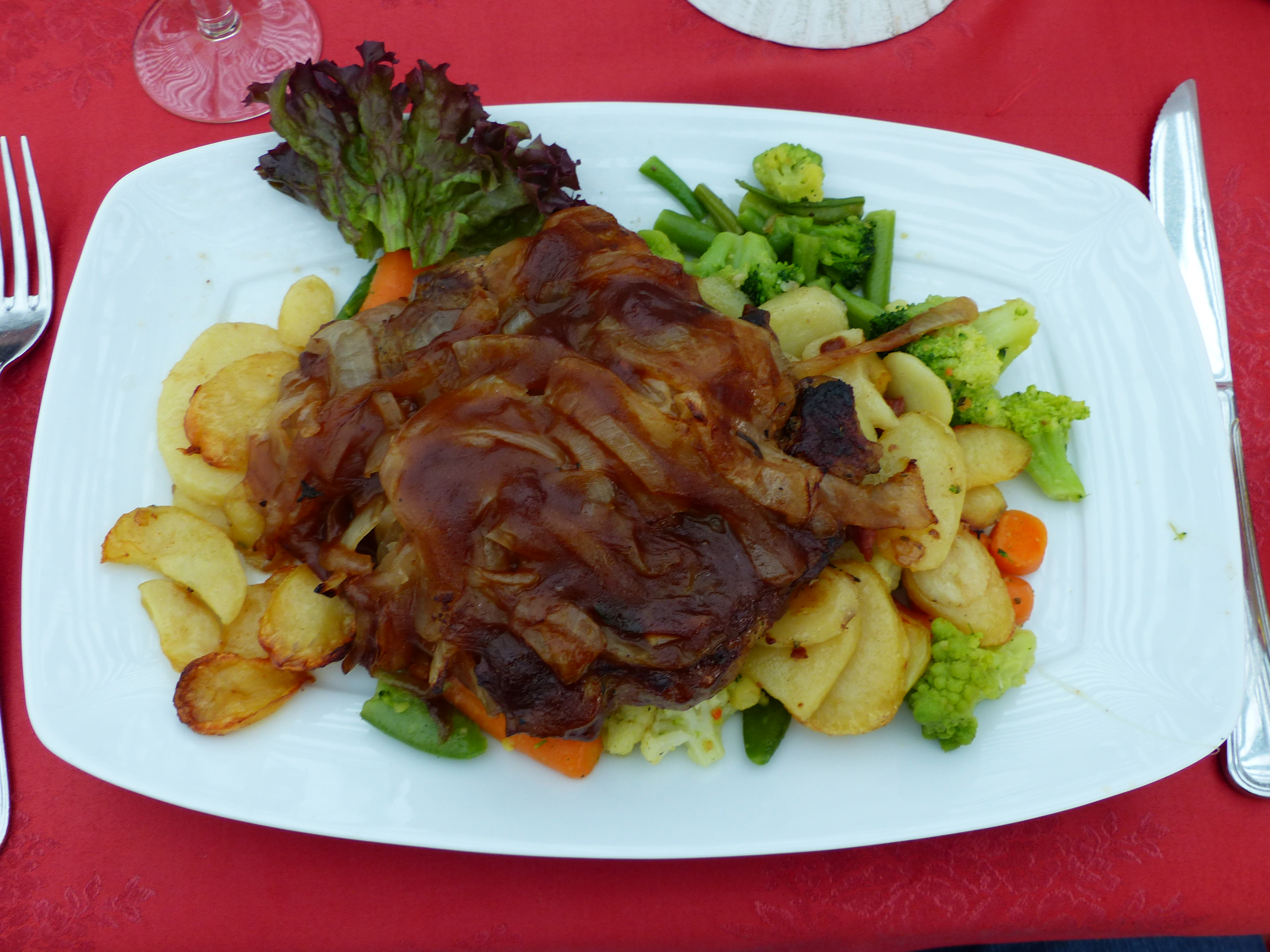
Thuringian marinated cutlet of pork (Rostbrätel) with pan fried potatoes

Wheat, grapes, sugarbeets, and barley grow well, along with a variety of vegetables, which grow near Erfurt, the state's capital. Cauliflower [300 hectares (740 acres)], cabbage (savoy, red, white) [10 ha (25 acres)], kohlrabi [15 ha (37 acres)], and broccoli [15 ha (37 acres)] grow by traditional means near Erfurt. Tomatoes, lettuce, broad beans, onions, and cucumbers are grown in the eastern portion of the region near Jena under glass centers on about 5 ha (12 acres) of land. Thuringia is the second-largest herb-growing region in Germany; the town of Kölleda was once considered the "peppermint town", where herb growers used to congregate to study herb cultivation.

One-third of Thuringia is covered in forest, and is considered to be one of the best game-hunting regions in Germany. Anyone holding a valid hunting license and a local hunting permit for the area may hunt for game such as red deer, roe deer, wild boar, rabbit, duck, and mouflon (mountain sheep). Pheasant and capercaillie are protected game species that may not be hunted. The wooded areas also contain a wide variety of edible mushrooms, such as chestnut mushrooms, porcini, and chanterelles, along with wild berries, such as blueberries, lingonberries, raspberries, and blackberries, which are all traditional accompaniments to game dishes.

The most famous foods from Thuringia are Thuringian sausages and Thuringian dumplings. The state is also known for its sausages; steamed, scaled, and cured varieties are all prepared. Popular varieties include Thüringer Mettwurst (a spreadable cured sausage), Feldkieker (a cured, air-dried sausage dried up to eight months), Thüringer Leberwurst (a steamed pork and liver sausage), Thüringer Rotwurst (a steamed blood sausage packed in a bladder or other natural casing) and Mett (minced pork).

=== Saxony ===
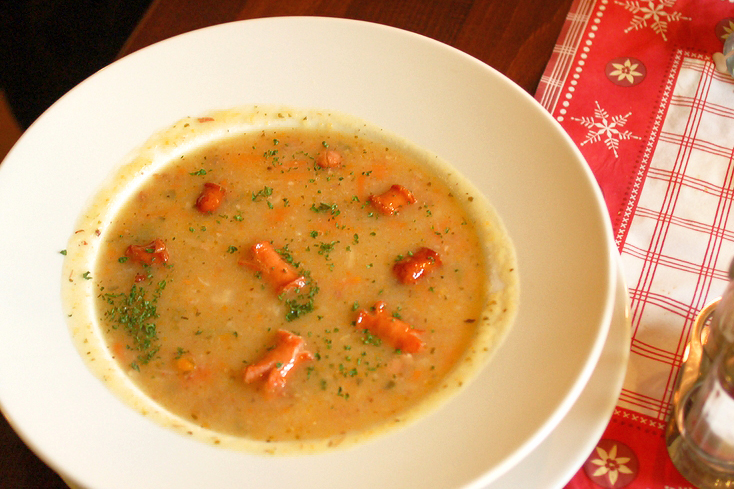
Sächsische Kartoffelsuppe (potato soup)

In general, the cuisine is very hearty and features many peculiarities of central Germany such as a great variety of sauces which accompany the main dish and the fashion to serve Klöße or Knödel as a side dish instead of potatoes, pasta or rice. A typical meal is Sächsischer Sauerbraten. Also much freshwater fish is used in Saxon cuisine, particularly carp and trout as is the case throughout Central and Eastern Europe.

The rich history of the region did and still does influence the cuisine. In the blossoming and growing cities of Dresden and Leipzig an extravagant style of cuisine is cherished (one may only think of the crab as an ingredient in the famous Leipziger Allerlei). In other, impoverished regions where the people had to work hard to yield some harvest (e.g., the Ore Mountains), peasant dishes play a major role; famous dishes originating from there include potatoes with Quark, potato soup or potato with bread and linseed oil. In the Vogtland region, where the peasants were wealthier, the tradition of Sunday roast remains to this day. Typical sweets at Christmas are Pulsnitzer Lebkuchen, Dresdner or Erzgebirgsstollen and Liegnitzer Bombe.

Cereal grain cultivation occupies 62% of the cultivated land in Saxony-Anhalt. Wheat, barley, oats, and rye are grown, with the rye being grown near Borde, where it is used to make Burger Knäckebrot, a flatbread produced there since 1931. Another 10% of the cultivated area is planted in sugar beets for conversion to sugar, popularized after the 19th century, when the region had an economic boom.

== International influences ==
=== German cuisine in other countries ===
German cuisine in other countries
German diaspora in the World

Total population
- German diaspora and ancestry: c. 70 million

Regions with significant populations
- Brazil, Argentina, United States, France, Colombia, Canada, Mexico, Uruguay, Australia, Venezuela, Germany, Switzerland, United Kingdom, Belgium, Chile and Paraguay

German-Brazil cuisine brought new types of food and beverage in Brazil or reinforced their utilizations by Brazilians. The wheat culture in Brazil arrived by German immigrants.

Kuchen, Sauerkraut (known in Portuguese as chucrute, is also used as derogatory term to designate Germans, and people of Central European origin or descent in general), Eisbein, new types of sausage and vegetables are some examples of food introduced in Brazil by the immigrants. In Curitiba, sausage are commonly known as vina, from the German Wiener (Wiener Würstchen). In Southern Brazil, Fruit preserves are known as chimia, from the German Schmier.

Chopp or Chope (from German Schoppen) in Brazilian Portuguese is the word for draught beer or just beer. Today, beer is the most consumed beverage in Brazil. The tradition of brewing in Brazil dates back to German immigration in the early 19th century. The first breweries date from the 1830s, although the brand Bohemia is claimed to be the first Brazilian beer, with production starting in 1853 in the city of Petrópolis founded by the German-Brazilian Henrique Kremer. In 1913 there were 134 breweries in Rio Grande do Sul. Brahma was founded in 1888 in Rio de Janeiro by the Swiss immigrant Joseph Villiger. Antarctica (Companhia Antarctica Paulista) was founded in the same year by the Brazilian Joaquim Salles and the German immigrant Louis Bücher in São Paulo. In 1999 the two brands merged creating AmBev.

German-Argentinien cuisine is a noticeable part of Argentine cuisine; the "Achtzig Schlag" cake, which was translated as Torta Ochenta Golpes in the country, can be found in some bakeries. In addition, dishes like chucrut (sauerkraut) and many different kinds of sausage-like bratwurst and others have also made it into mainstream Argentine cuisine.

German-Americans introduced popular foods such as hot dogs and hamburgers to America. They also introduced America to lager, the most-produced beer style in the United States, and have been the dominant ethnic group in the beer industry since 1850.

The German founded Tsingtao Brewery is China's second largest brewery, with about 15% of domestic market share and also accounts for half of China's national beer exports.

=== Influence of immigration to German cuisine ===
Elements of international cuisine (apart from influences from neighbouring countries) are a relatively recent phenomenon in German cuisine, compared with other West European states. Colonial goods shops spread only in the 19th and early 20th centuries and brought luxury goods like cocoa, coconuts, rare exotic spices, coffee and (non-herbal) tea to a wider audience.

The first wave of foreigners coming to Germany specifically to sell their food specialties were ice cream makers from northern Italy, who started to arrive in noticeable numbers during the late 1920s. With the post-World War II contacts with Allied occupation troops, and especially with the influx of more and more foreign workers that began during the second half of the 1950s, many foreign dishes have been adopted into German cuisine — Italian dishes, such as spaghetti and pizza, have become staples of the German diet. In 2008, there were around 9,000 pizzerias and 7,000 Italian restaurants in Germany. The pizza is Germany's favourite fast food.

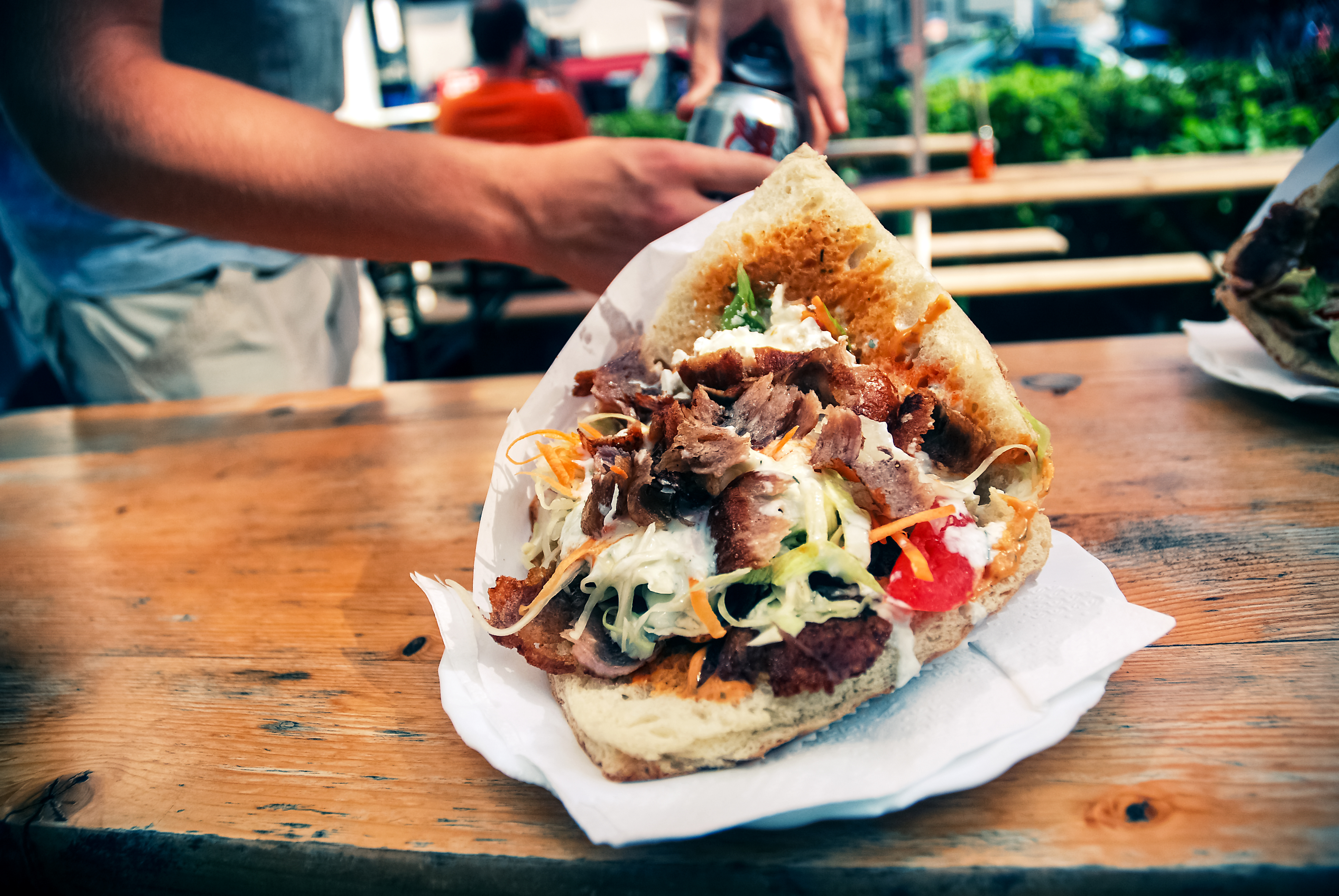
Döner kebab

Turkish immigrants have introduced Turkish foods to Germany, notably the modern döner kebab. In November 2017, it was estimated that 1,500 döner kebab shops were present in Berlin and in circa 16,000 in whole Germany.

Arab (mostly Syrian, Lebanese or Moroccan), Chinese, Balkan, Japanese (especially Sushi) and Greek (especially Gyros) restaurants and bars are also widespread in Germany. Indian (especially Curry dishes), Vietnamese, Thai, and other Asian cuisines are rapidly gaining in popularity since the early 2000s. Until the late 1990s many of the more expensive restaurants served mostly French inspired dishes for decades. Since the end of the 1990s, they have been shifting to a more refined form of German cuisine.

Before 1990, the cuisine from East Germany (1949–1990) was influenced by those of other nations within the former Communist bloc. East Germans traveled abroad to these countries on holiday (and vice versa as well), and soldiers coming to East Germany from these countries brought their dishes with them. A typical dish that came to the East German kitchen this way is Russian Soljanka.

== Food industry ==
=== Overview ===
Germany is the third largest agricultural producer in the European Union and the third largest agricultural exporter in the world. In 2013, German food exports were worth around EUR 66 billion. Several food products are internationally known brands.

=== German retailers ===
Aldi and Schwarz Gruppe (Lidl) are Europe's largest retailers.

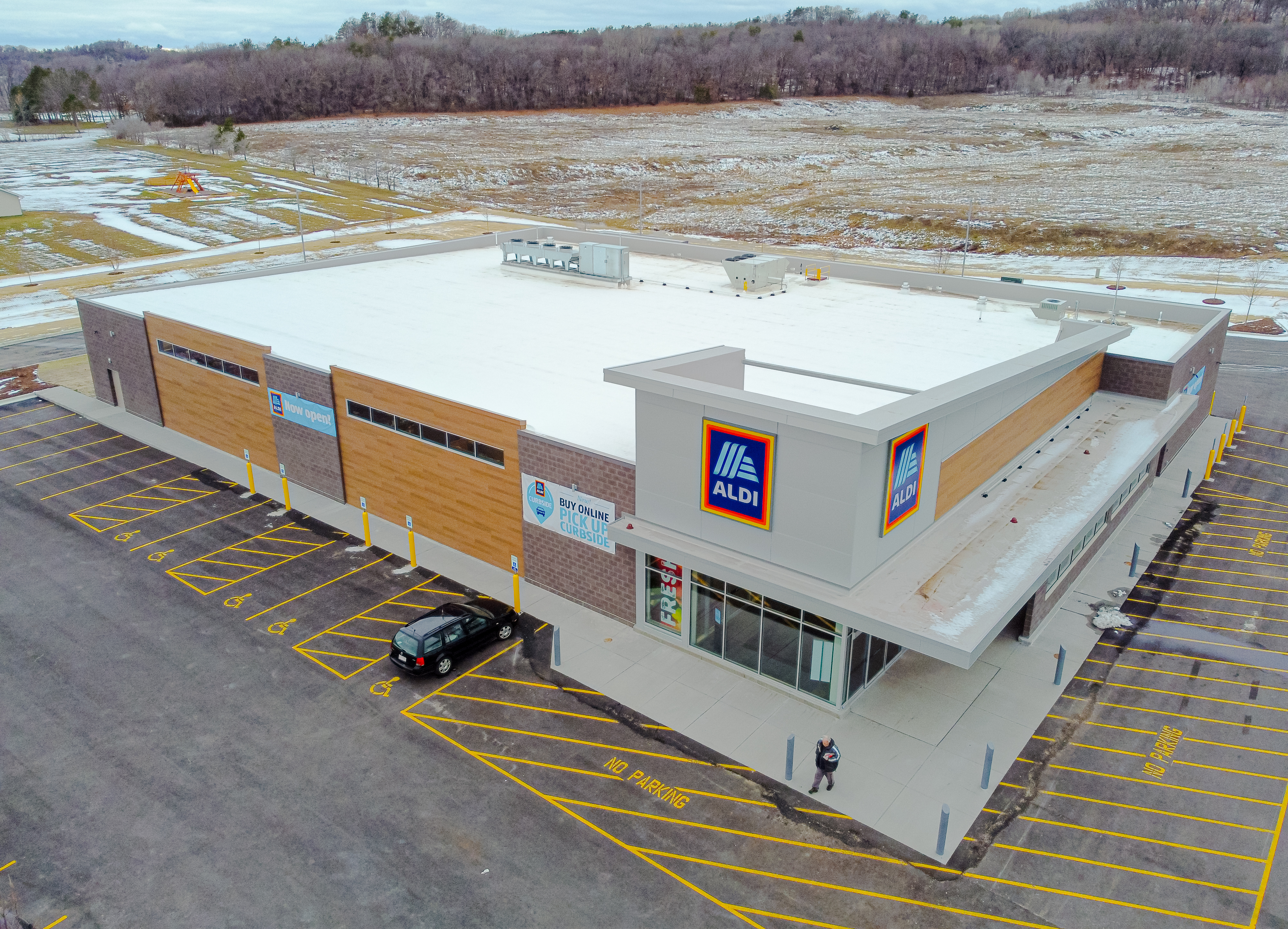
Aldi in Sparta, Wisconsin, United States

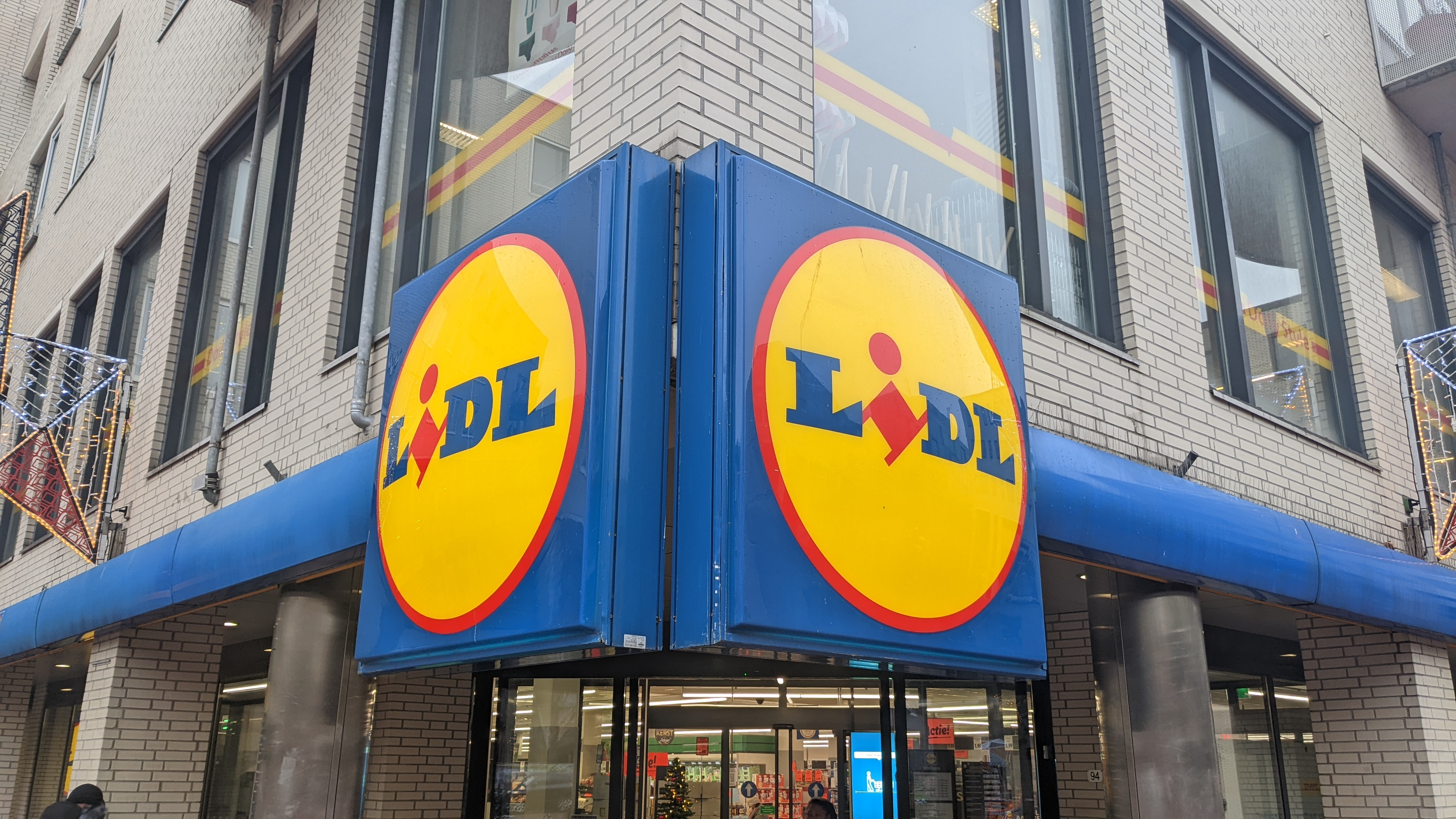
Lidl store in Amsterdam, Netherlands

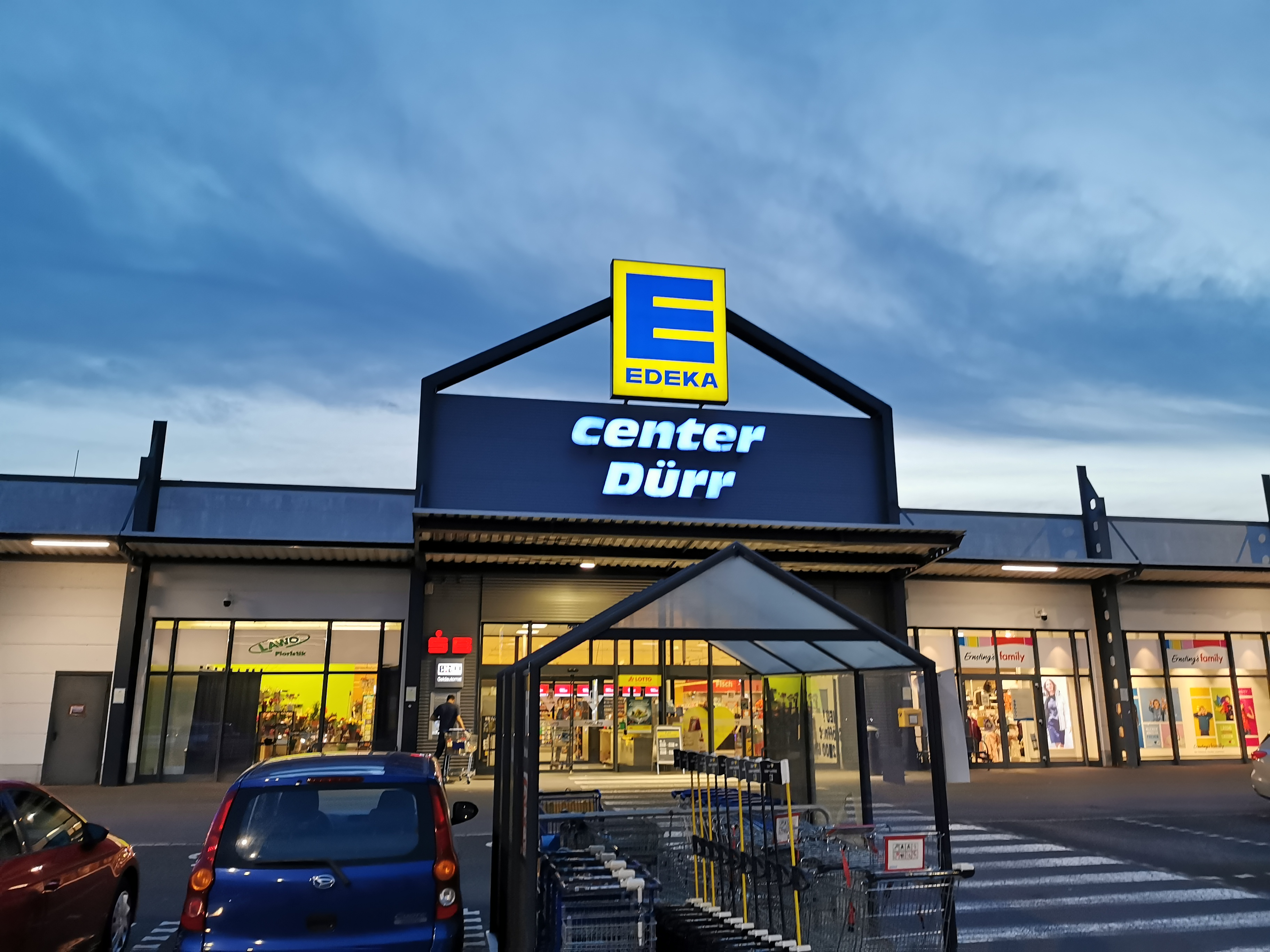
Edeka store in Tauberbischofsheim

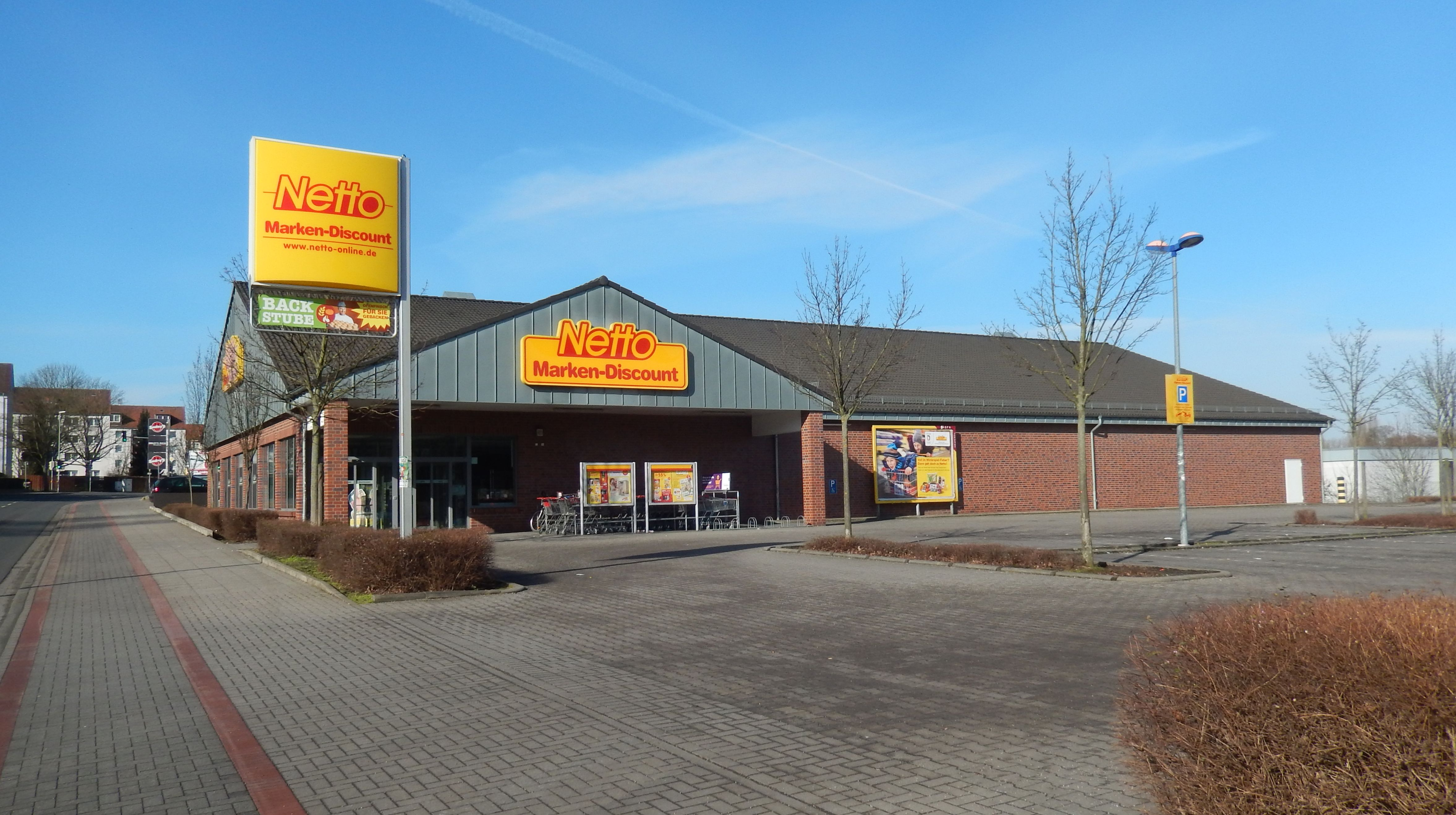
Netto Marken-Discount store in Hannover, Germany

=== German food industry products ===
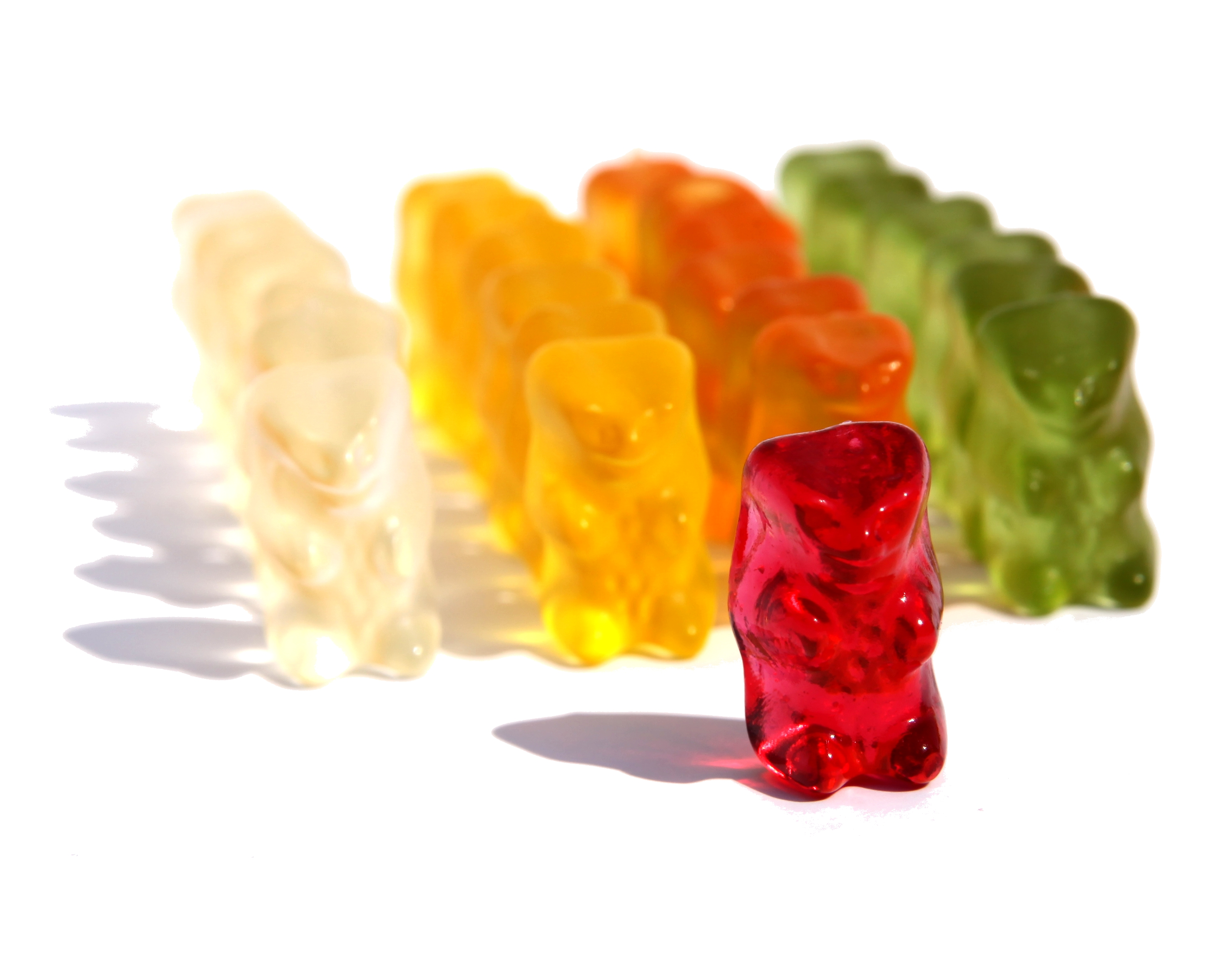
Gummy bears

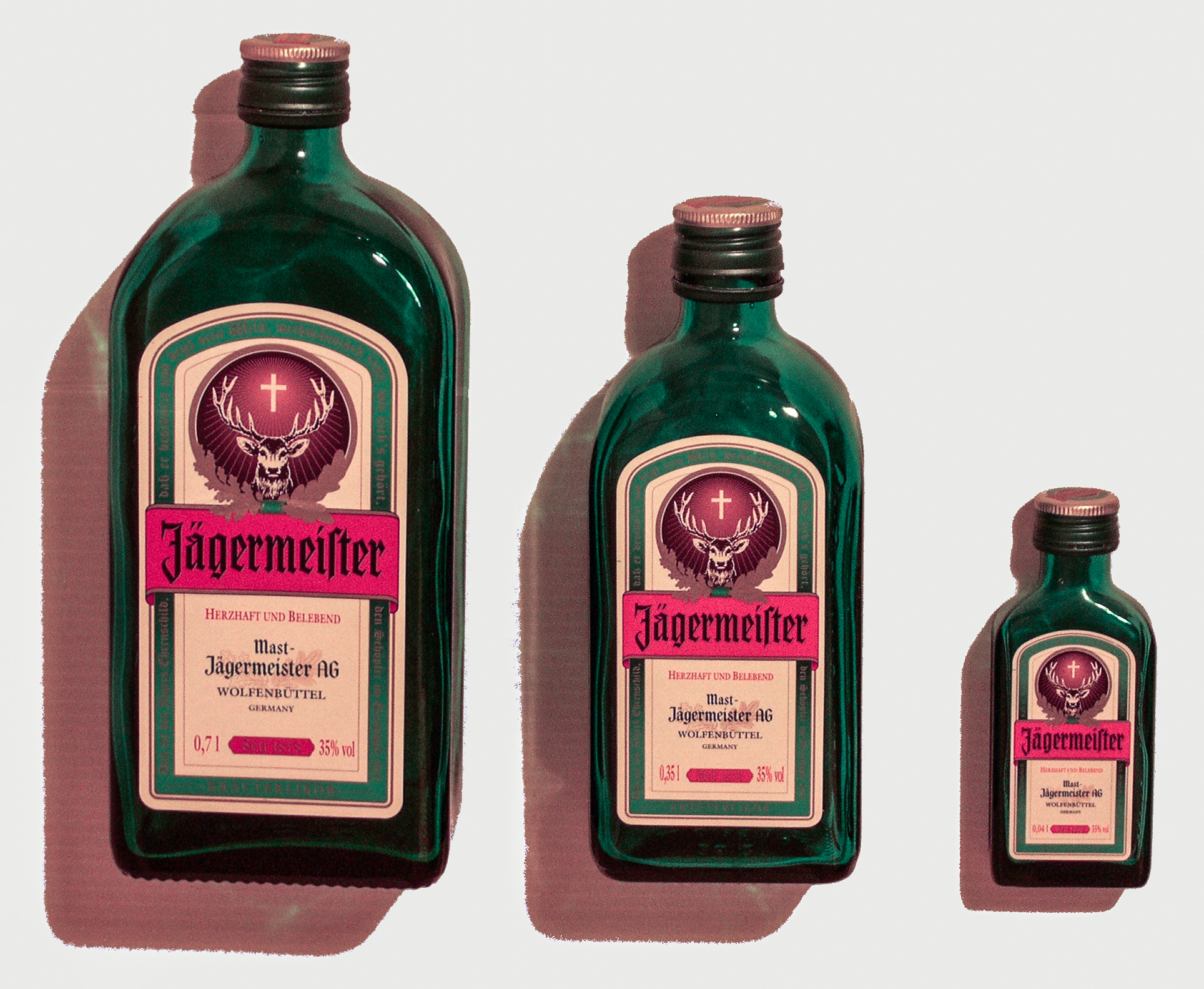
Jägermeister liqueur

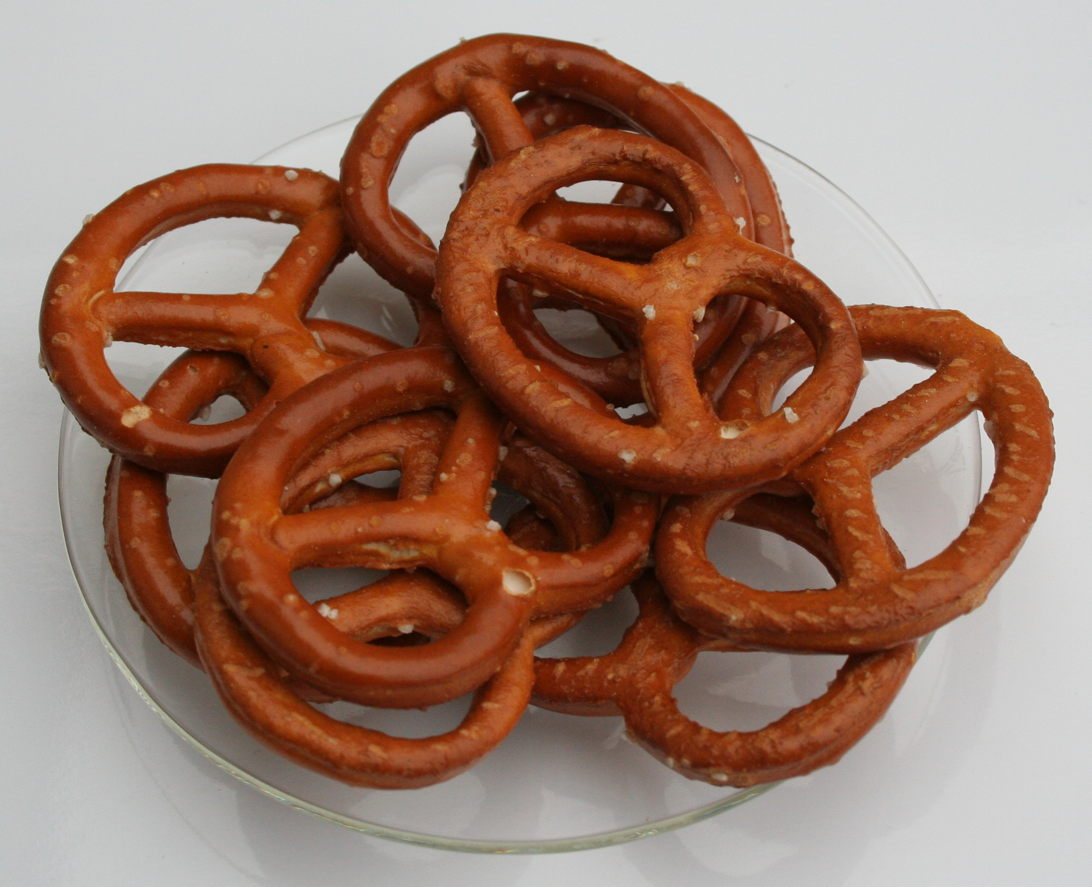
Mini pretzels

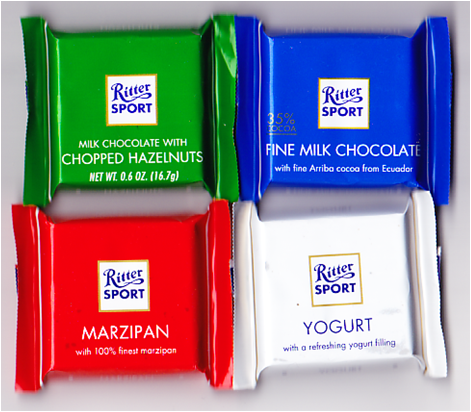
Ritter Sport Chocolate

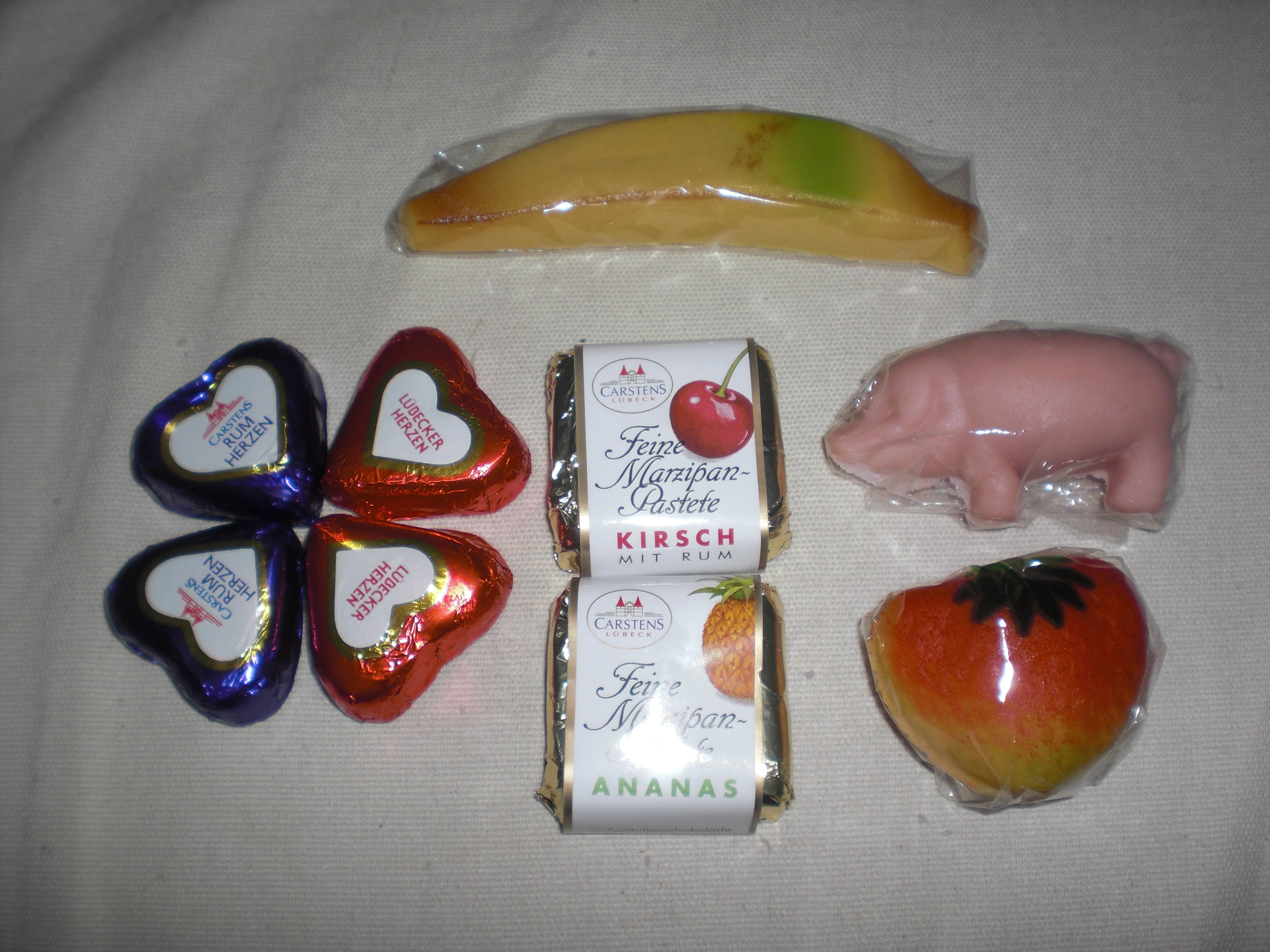
Lübecker Marzipan

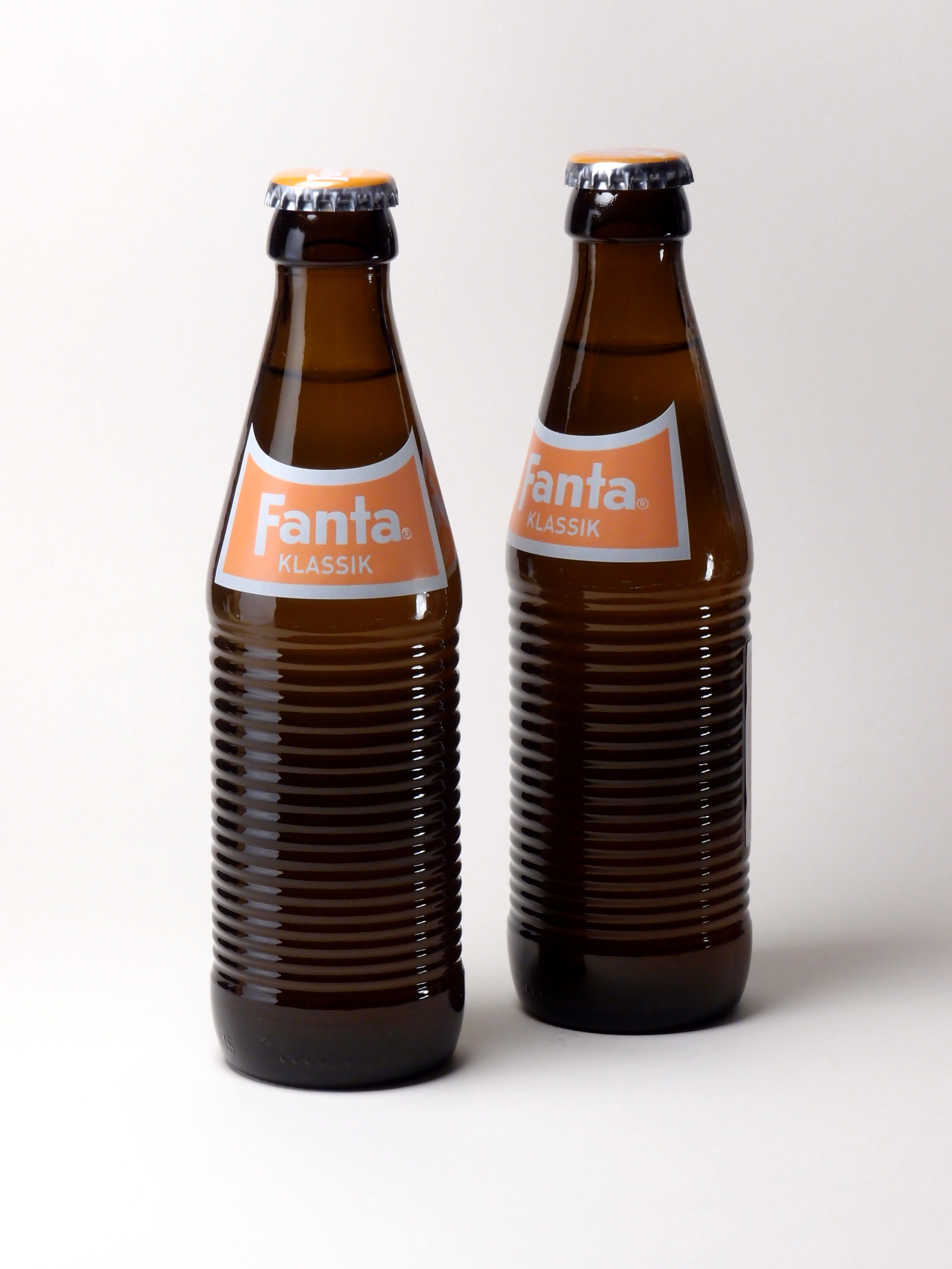
The original Fanta

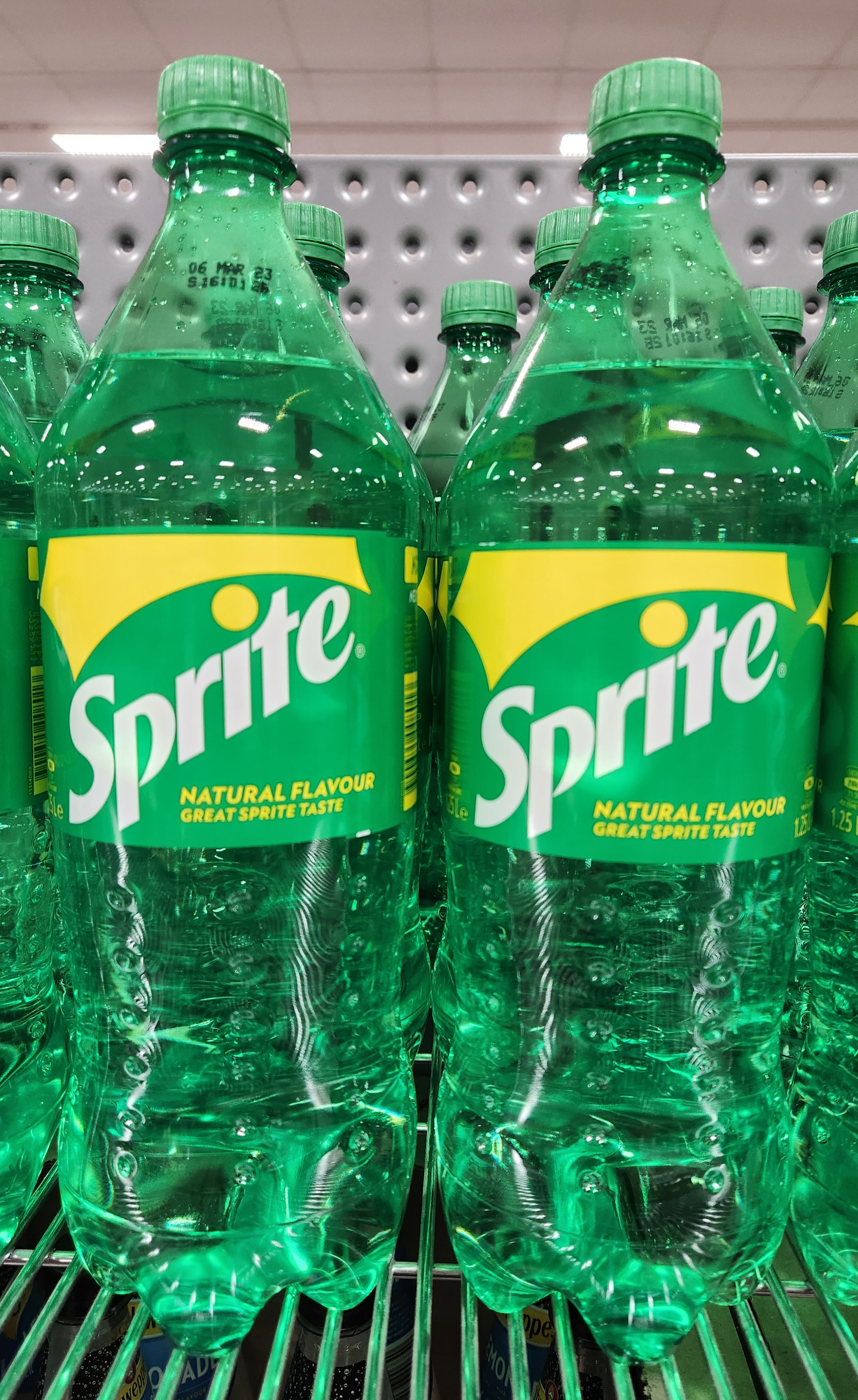
Sprite

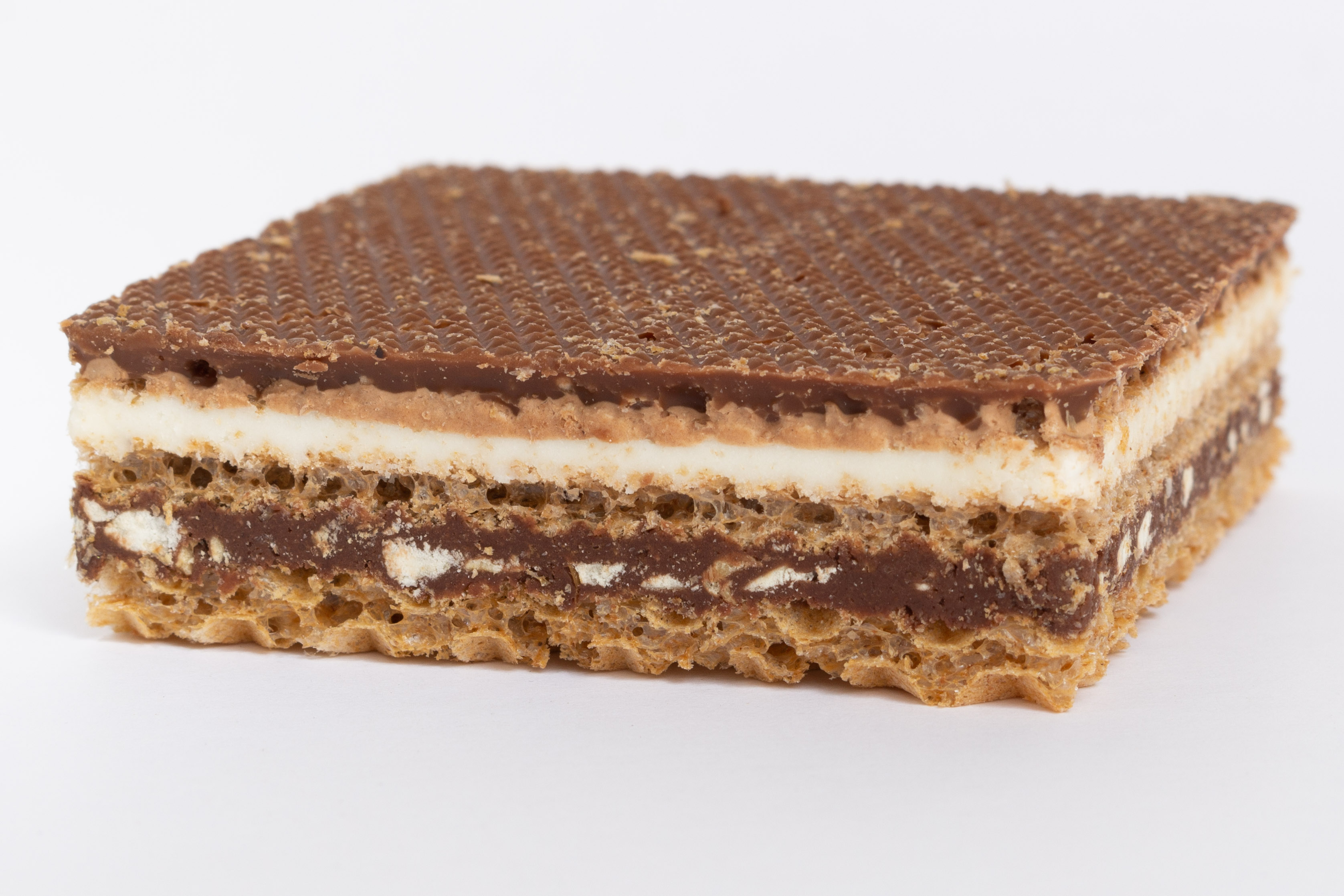
Knoppers

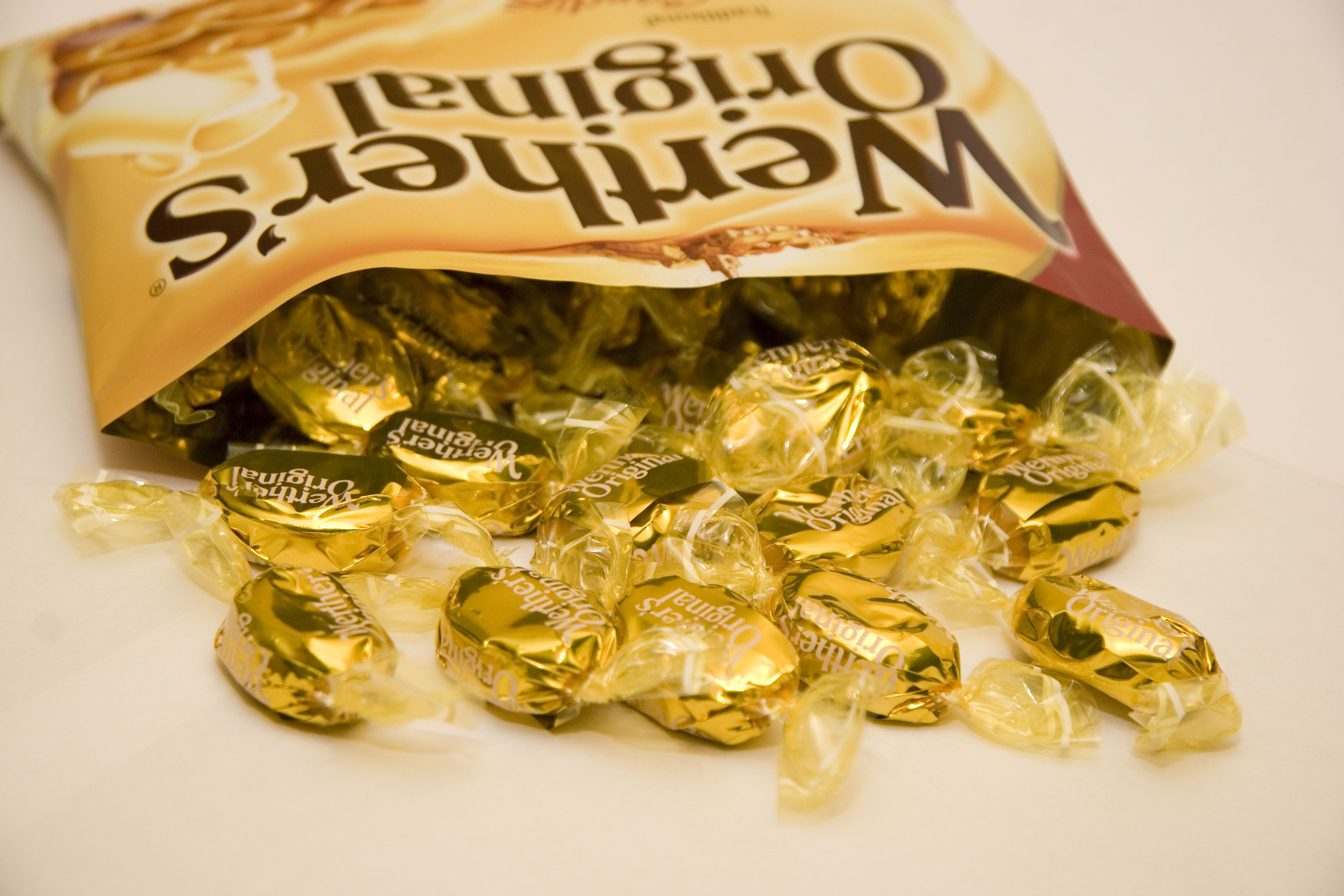
Werther's Original

== See also ==
- List of German cheeses
- List of German dishes
- List of German soups
