= List of German cheeses =

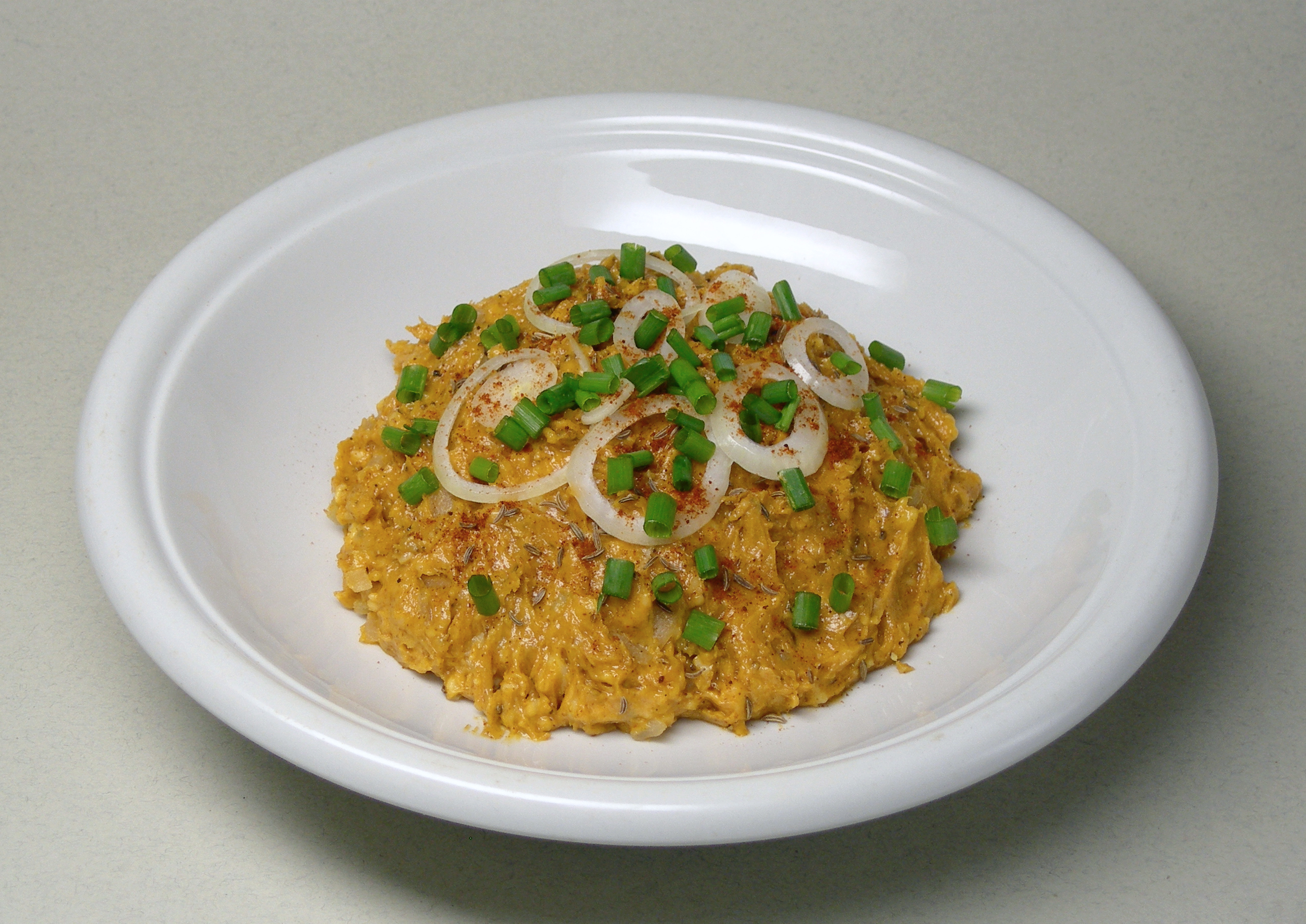
Bavarian Obatzda, made from camembert, butter, onions and spices

Cheeses have played a significant role in German cuisine, both historically and in contemporary times. Cheeses are incorporated in the preparation of various dishes in German cuisine. Germany's cheese production comprises approximately one-third of the total for all European-produced cheeses.

== German cheeses ==
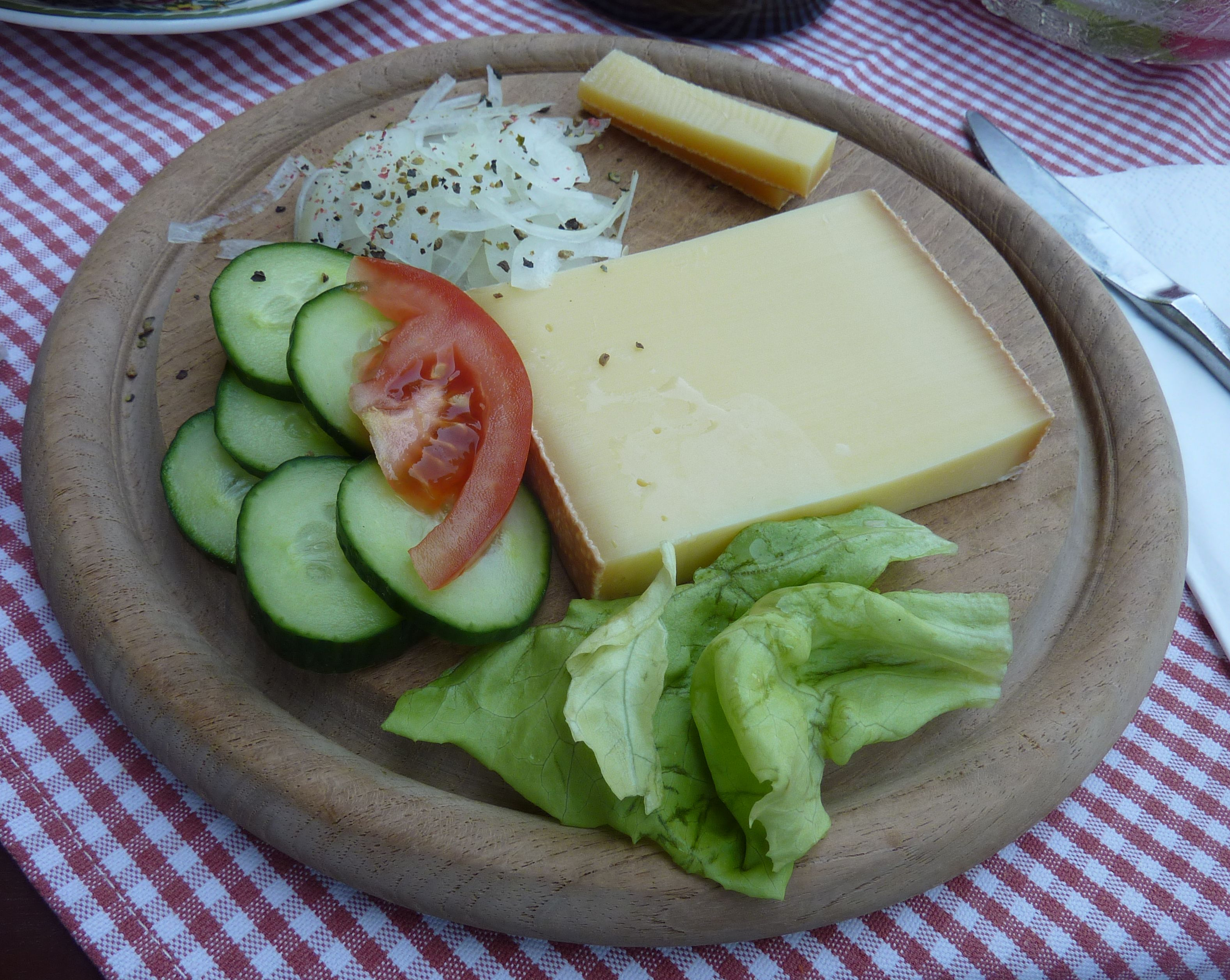
Allgäuer Bergkäse

=== A ===
- Allgäuer Bergkäse – Prepared in Allgäu from unpasteurized cow's milk, it is ripened for a minimum of four months and has a smooth texture.
- Allgäuer Emmentaler – Prepared in Allgäu from unpasteurized cow's milk, it is ripened for more than 3 months and has a firm texture. Because of its protected designation of origin, the cheese may only be produced in the German state of Bavaria.
- Altenburger Ziegenkäse – a soft cheese from cow's milk and goat's milk with caraway seeds in the cheese dough, and inoculated with Tyrophagus casei, the cheese mite. The surface is covered with a fine, grey powder or bloom, due to the mites themselves and their moulted skin and faeces. Because of its protected designation of origin, the cheese may only be produced in the districts of Altenburger Land, Burgenland and Leipzig and the independent city of Gera.

=== B ===
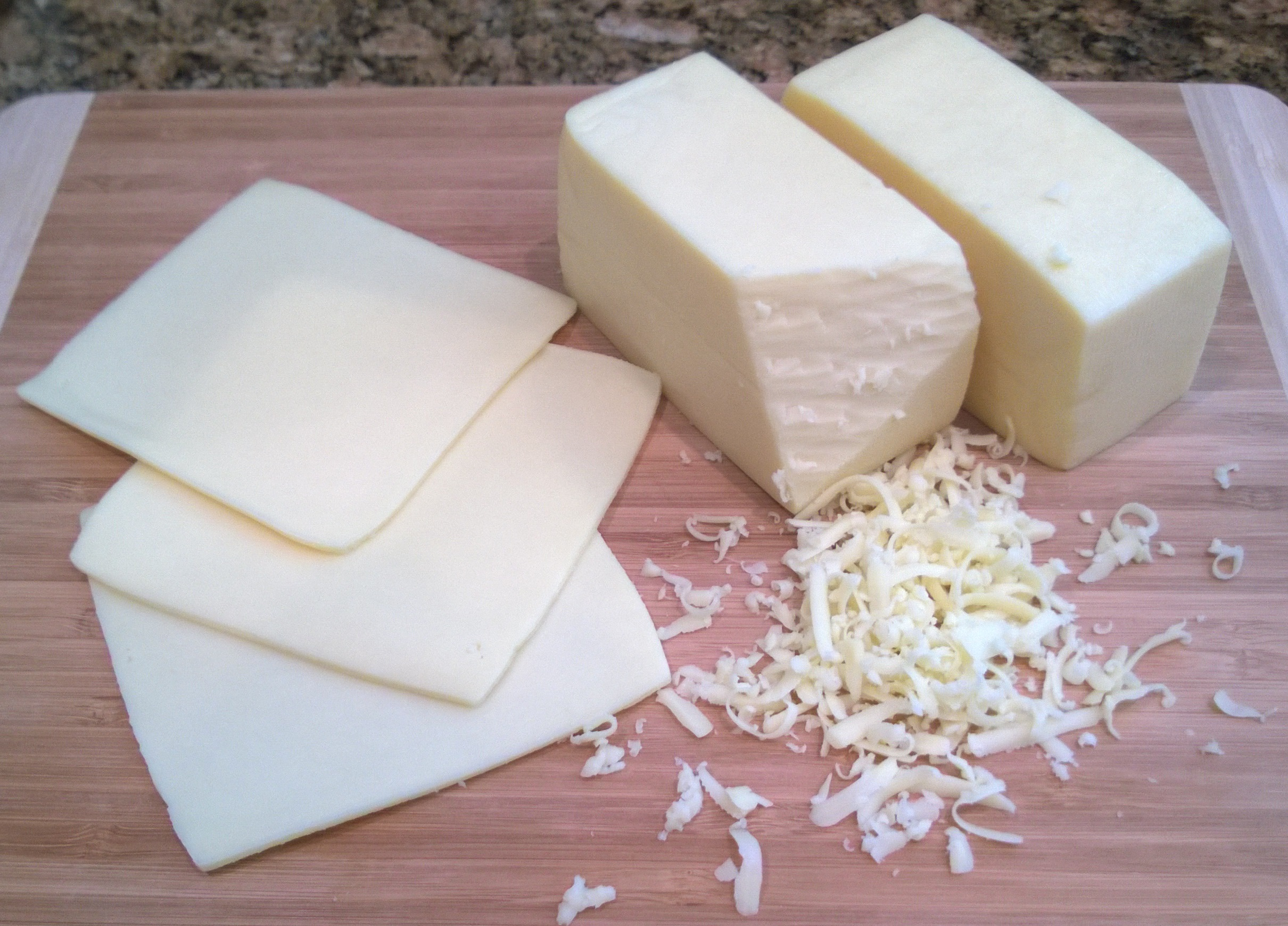
Butterkäse

- Backstein – similar to Limburger, it is processed in a brick shape.
- Bergader - similar to Italian Gorgonzola or French Roquefort.
- Bonifaz – a soft, white mold cheese.
- Butterkäse – translated as "butter cheese" in German, it is a semi-soft, cow's milk cheese that is moderately popular in Germanic Europe, and occasionally seen throughout the rest of the world.

=== C ===
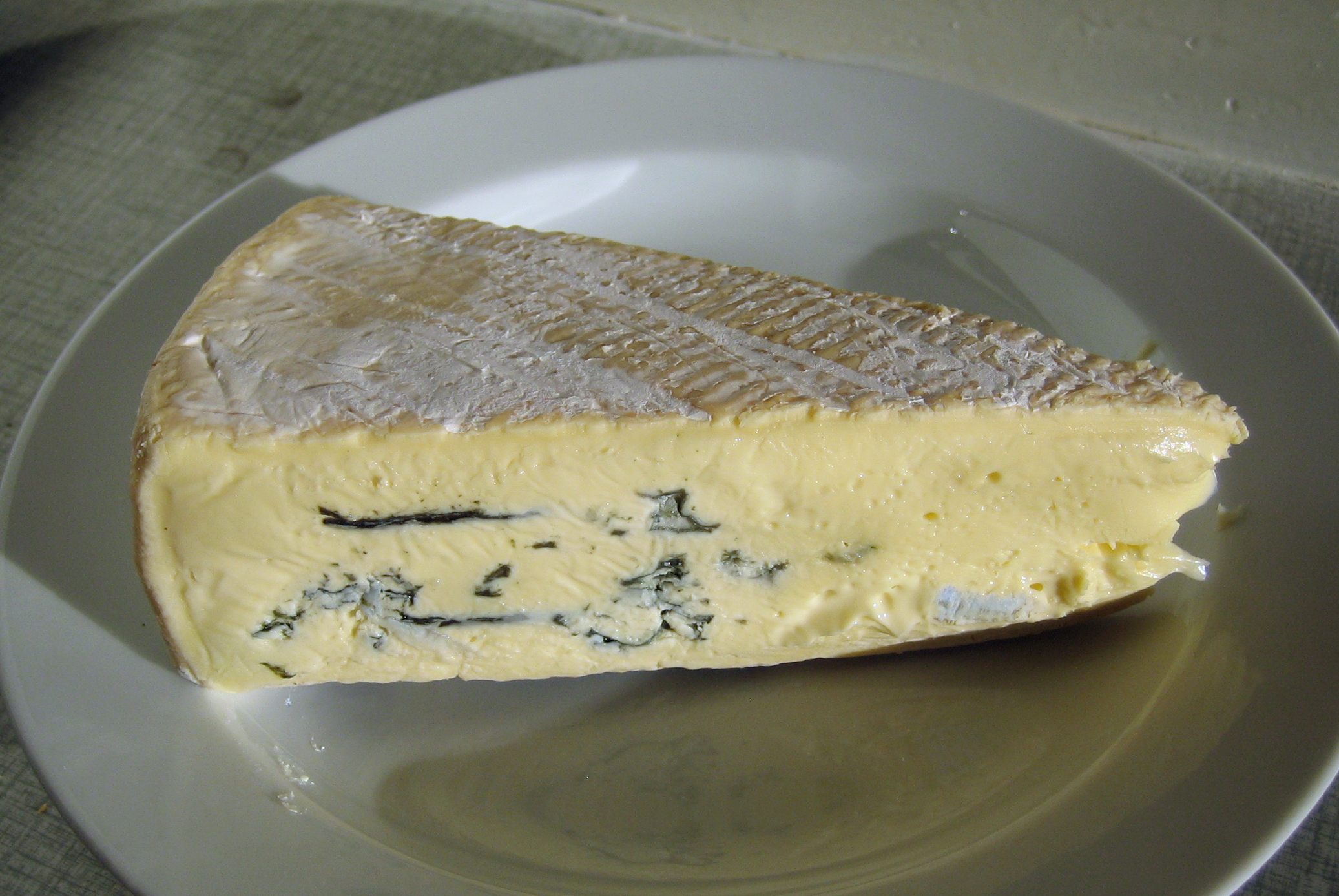
Cambozola cheese

- Cambozola – patented and industrially produced for the world market by large German company Champignon in the 1970s. The cheese was invented circa 1900 and is still produced by Champignon. In English-speaking countries, Cambozola is often marketed as Blue brie. It is a “hybrid” of Camembert and Gorgonzola cheeses, hence the name.

=== E ===
- Edelpilzkäse – Edelpilzkäse is a fine blue-veined cheese with a pale ivory paste. It is similar to Roquefort, but milder because it is made with cow's milk. Edelpilzkäse is made by mixing cow's milk with Penicillium spores. The mold grows within the cheese, giving the cheese the internal blue veining traveling vertically throughout and a tangy flavor. It is available in 45%, 50%, and 60% fat level.

=== H ===
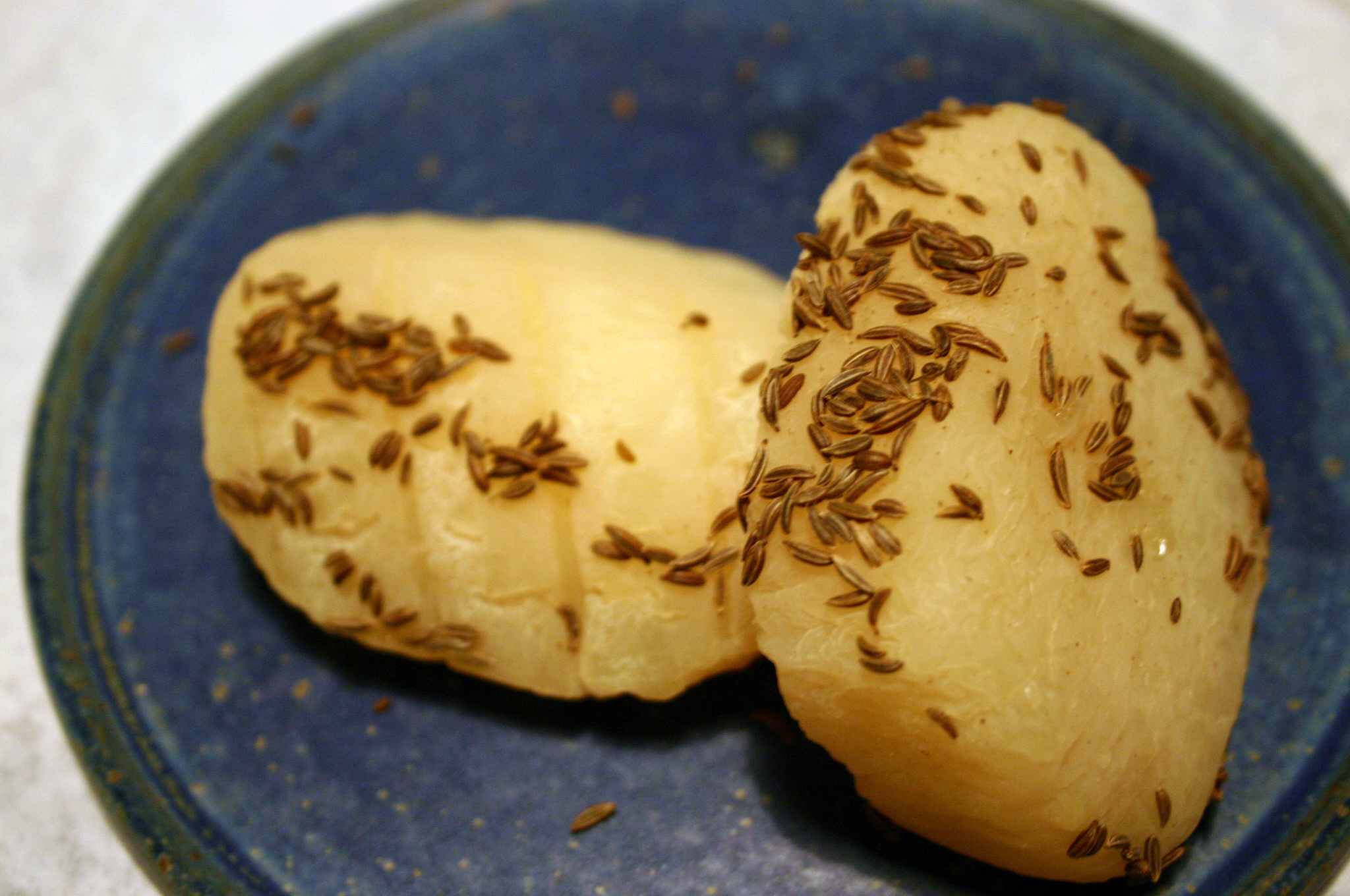
Handkäse

- Handkäse – a German Protected designation origin (PDO) regional sour milk cheese (similar to Harzer) and is a culinary speciality of Frankfurt am Main, Offenbach am Main, Darmstadt, Langen and all other parts of southern Hesse. It gets its name from the traditional way of producing it: forming it with one's own hands.
- Harzer – a sour milk cheese made from low fat curd cheese, which contains only about one percent fat and originates in the Harz mountain region south of Braunschweig.
- Hirtenkäse – or "herder's cheese", is a distinctive golden-colored, hard cow's milk cheese made in the Allgäu area of Southern Germany.
- Hohenheim – a soft cheese, produced in a round form.

=== K ===
- Kochkäse – a runny sour milk cheese similar to French Cancoillotte. It is made from quark, butter, soda, salt and caraway seeds.

=== L ===
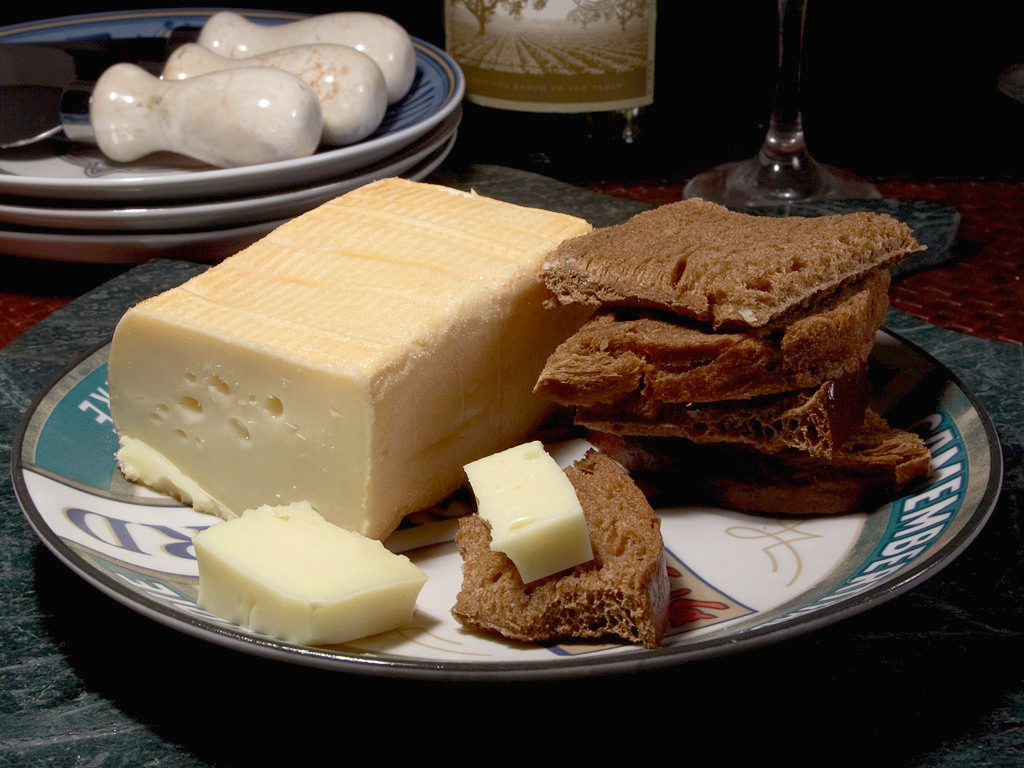
Limburger and bread

- Limburger – originally created in Belgium by Trappist monks, production began in Germany in the 19th century.

=== M ===
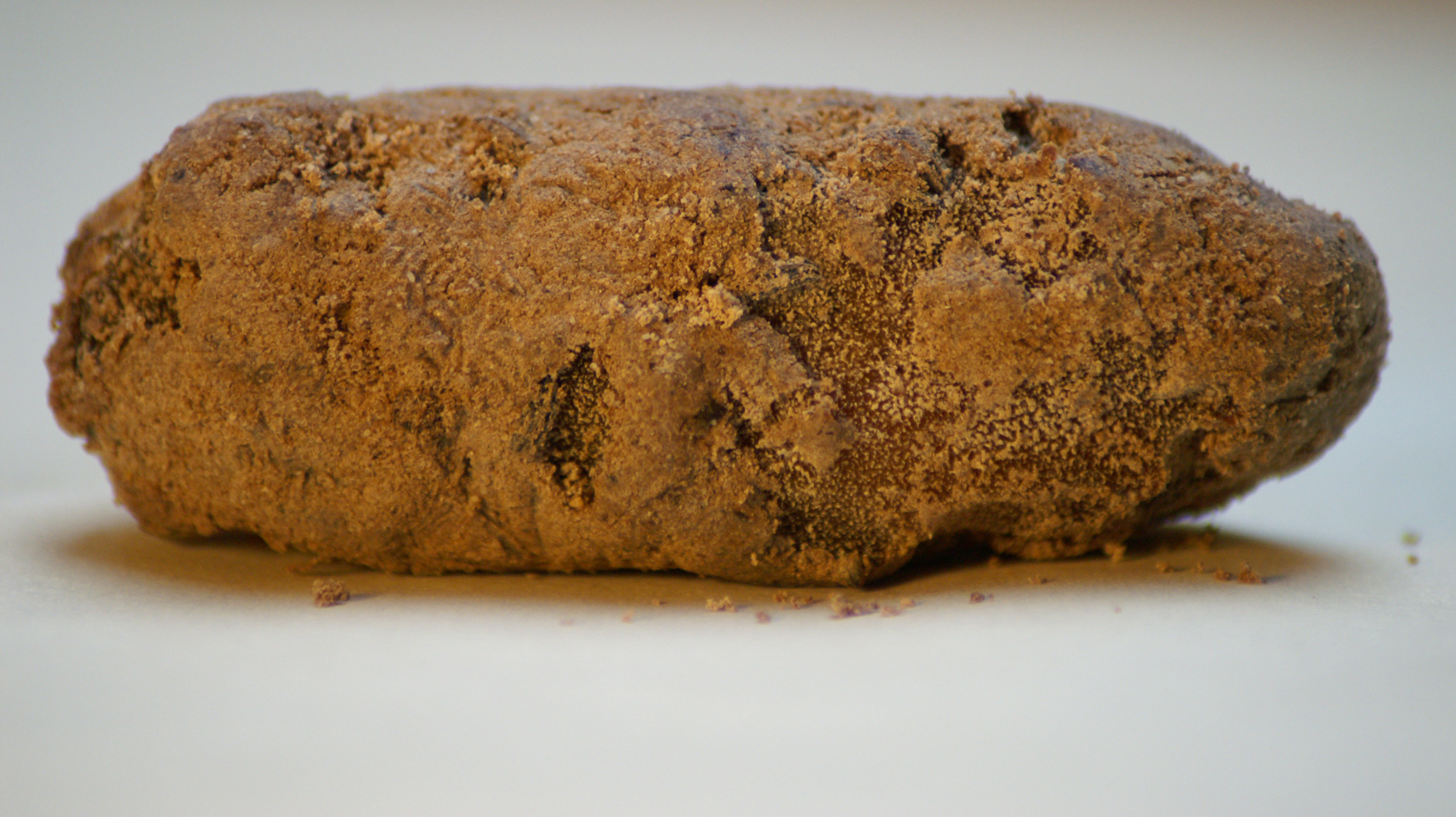
Milbenkäse

- Milbenkäse – a specialty cheese made from quark and produced using the action of cheese mites. Historically, the cheese was produced in the Saxony-Anhalt/Thuringia border region of Zeitz and Altenburg districts; today it is produced exclusively in the village of Würchwitz, in the state of Saxony-Anhalt. Mites clinging to the cheese rind are consumed along with the cheese.
- Milkana – processed cheese.

=== N ===
- Nieheimer – a sour milk cheese made in and named after Nieheim, a town in Höxter district in North Rhine-Westphalia, Germany.

=== O ===
- Obatzda – a Bavarian cheese delicacy prepared by mixing two thirds aged soft cheese, usually Camembert (Romadur or similar cheeses may be used as well), and one third butter.

=== Q ===
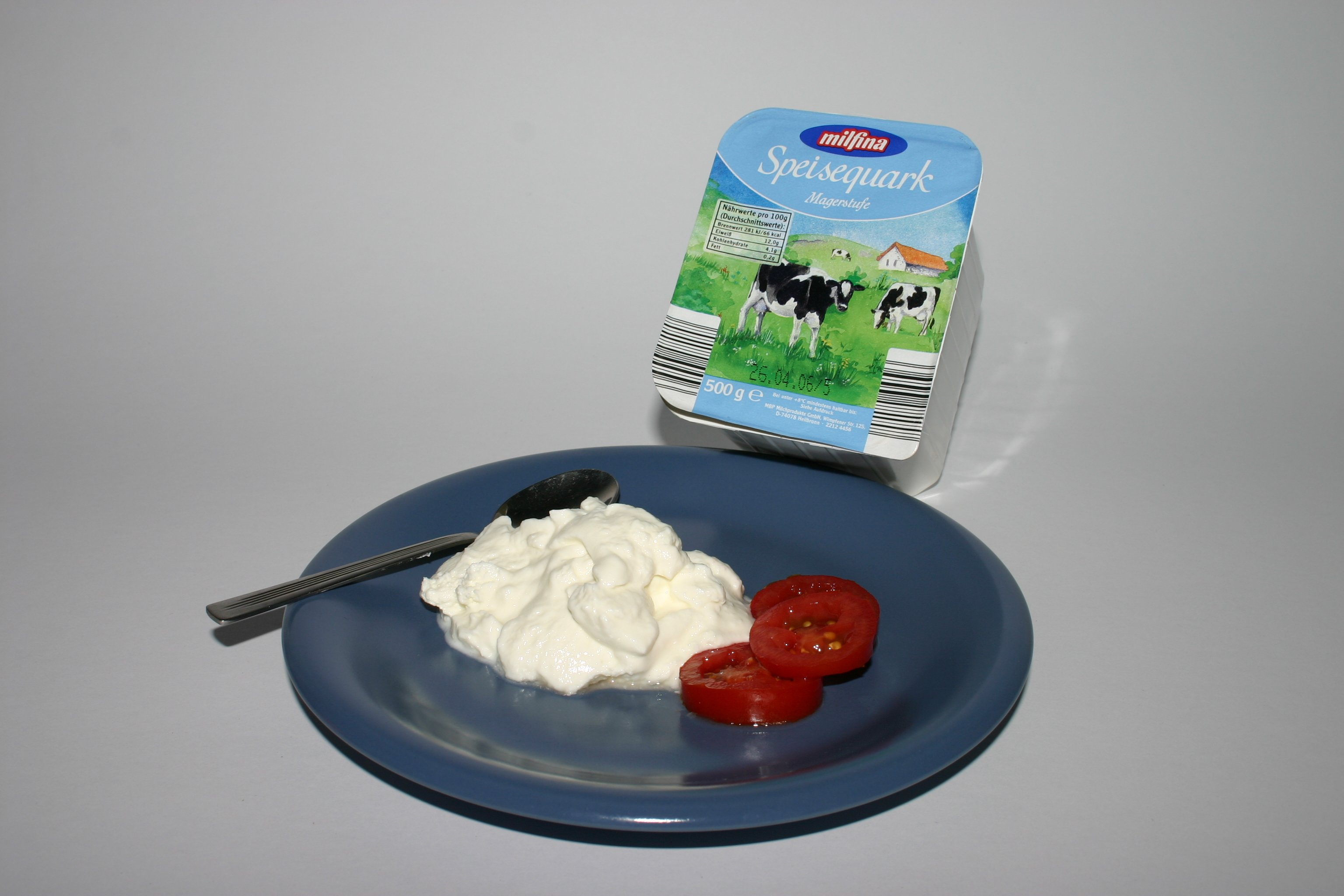
German Quark in its usual creamy form

- Quark - a fresh, mild cheese, in Germany, quark is sold in small plastic tubs and usually comes in three different varieties, Magerquark (lean quark, virtually fat-free), "regular" quark (20% fat in dry mass) and Sahnequark (creamy quark, 40% fat in dry mass) with added cream. In addition to that, quark is sold lightly sweetened with a variety of fruits as a dessert (similar to yoghurt).

=== R ===
- Rauchkäse – a German variety of smoked cheese, known for being semi-soft with a smoky brown rind. The most famous variety is Bruder Basil, named for dairy entrepreneur Basil Weixler.
- Romadur – This is a cow's milk cheese with pungent flavor. It is one of the most popular cheeses in Germany.

=== S ===
- Spundekäs – a spiced cream cheese, originally from the region of Northern Rhenish Hesse. Nowadays, it is often enjoyed in the areas of Rhenish Hesse and the Rheingau area. It is especially popular in wine houses in the region, served with soft pretzels, accompanying regional wine. It is classically made of cream cheese and quark, and seasoned with salt, pepper and paprika. It is somewhat similar to Obatzda.

=== T ===
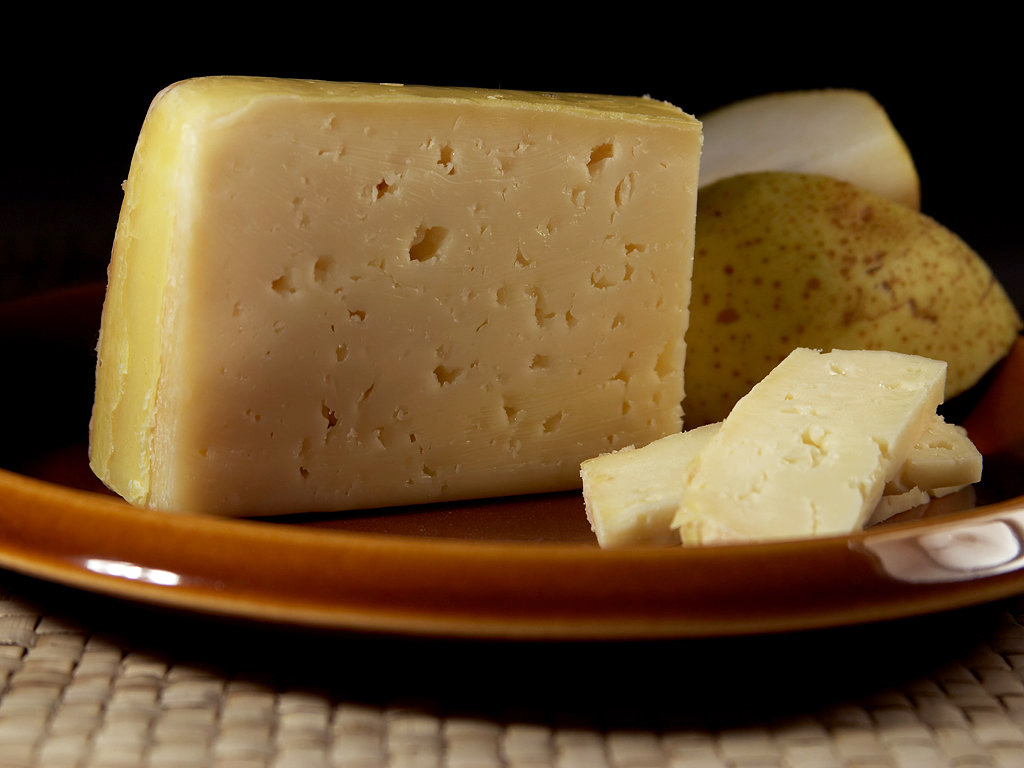
Tilsit cheese

- Tilsit cheese – a light yellow semi-hard smear-ripened cheese, created in the mid-19th century by Prussian-Swiss settlers in Tilsit (East Prussia), the Westphal family, from the Emmental valley.

=== W ===
- Weißlacker – (German for "whitewashed" due to the rind color) or Beer cheese is a type of cow's milk cheese that originated in Germany, but is now known worldwide. It is a pungent and salted surface-ripened cheese that starts out much like brick cheese.

=== Z ===
- Ziegel – prepared from cow's milk.

== See also ==
- List of cheeses
- List of cheesemakers
- List of German dishes
