= Wine and food pairing =

Process of pairing food dishes with wine to enhance the dining experience

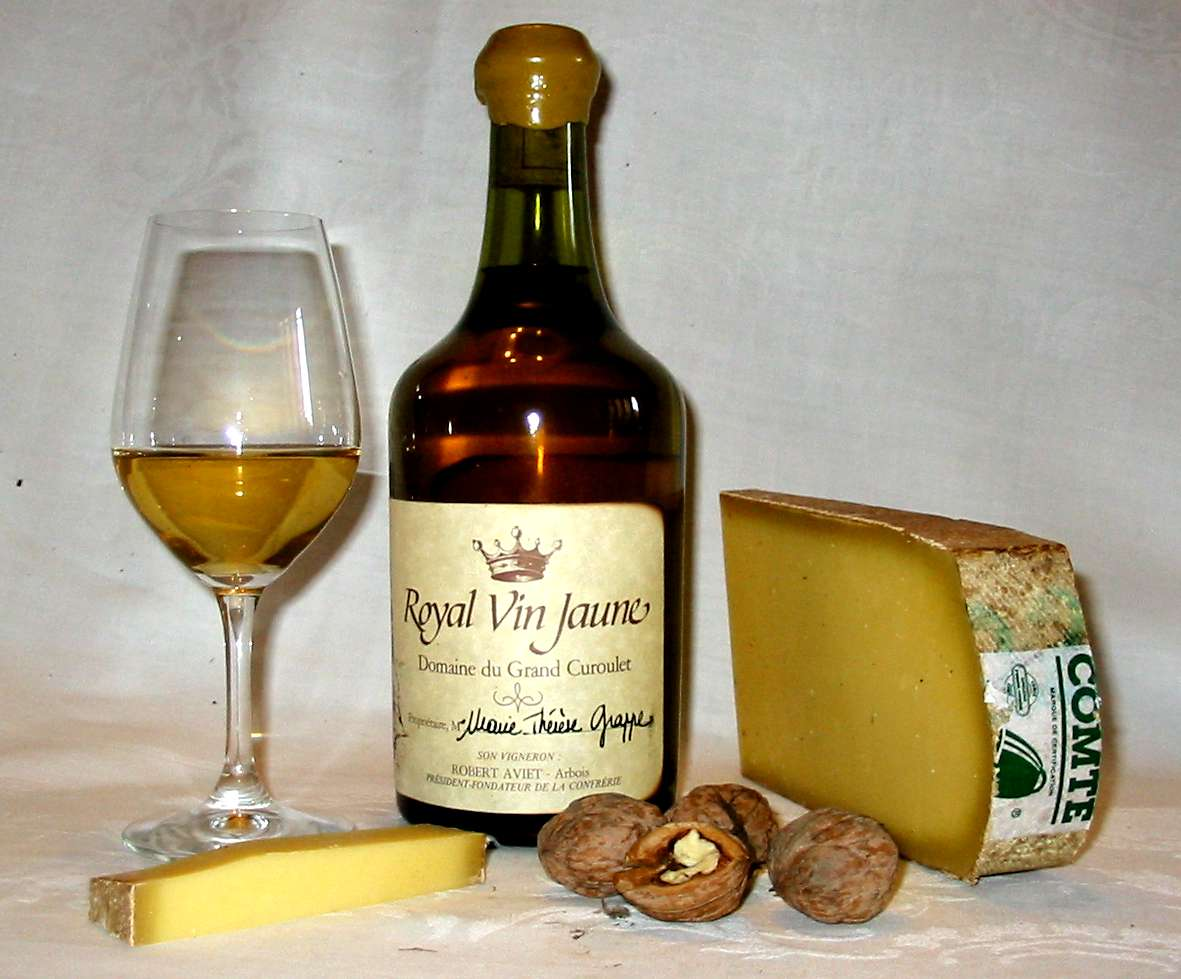
A pairing of vin jaune with walnuts and Comté cheese

Wine and food pairing is the process of pairing food dishes with wine to enhance the dining experience. In many cultures, wine has had a long history of being a staple at the dinner table and in some ways both the winemaking and culinary traditions of a region have evolved together over the years. Rather than following a set of rules, local cuisines were paired simply with local wines. The modern "art" of food pairings is a relatively recent phenomenon, fostering an industry of books and media with guidelines for pairings of particular foods and wine. In the restaurant industry, sommeliers are often present to make food pairing recommendations for the guest. The main concept behind pairings is that certain elements (such as texture and flavor) in both food and wine interact with each other, and thus finding the right combination of these elements can make the entire dining experience more enjoyable. However, taste and enjoyment are subjective and what may be a "textbook perfect" pairing for one taster could be less enjoyable to another.

While there are many books, magazines and websites with detailed guidelines on how to pair food and wine, most food and wine experts believe that the most basic element of food and wine pairing is understanding the balance between the "weight" of the food and the weight (or body) of the wine. Heavy, robust wines like Cabernet Sauvignon can overwhelm a light, delicate dish like a quiche, while light-bodied wines like Pinot Grigio would be similarly overwhelmed by a hearty stew. Beyond weight, flavors and textures can either be contrasted or complemented. From there a food and wine pairing can also take into consideration the sugar, acid, alcohol and tannins of the wine and how they can be accentuated or minimized when paired with certain types of food.

== History ==
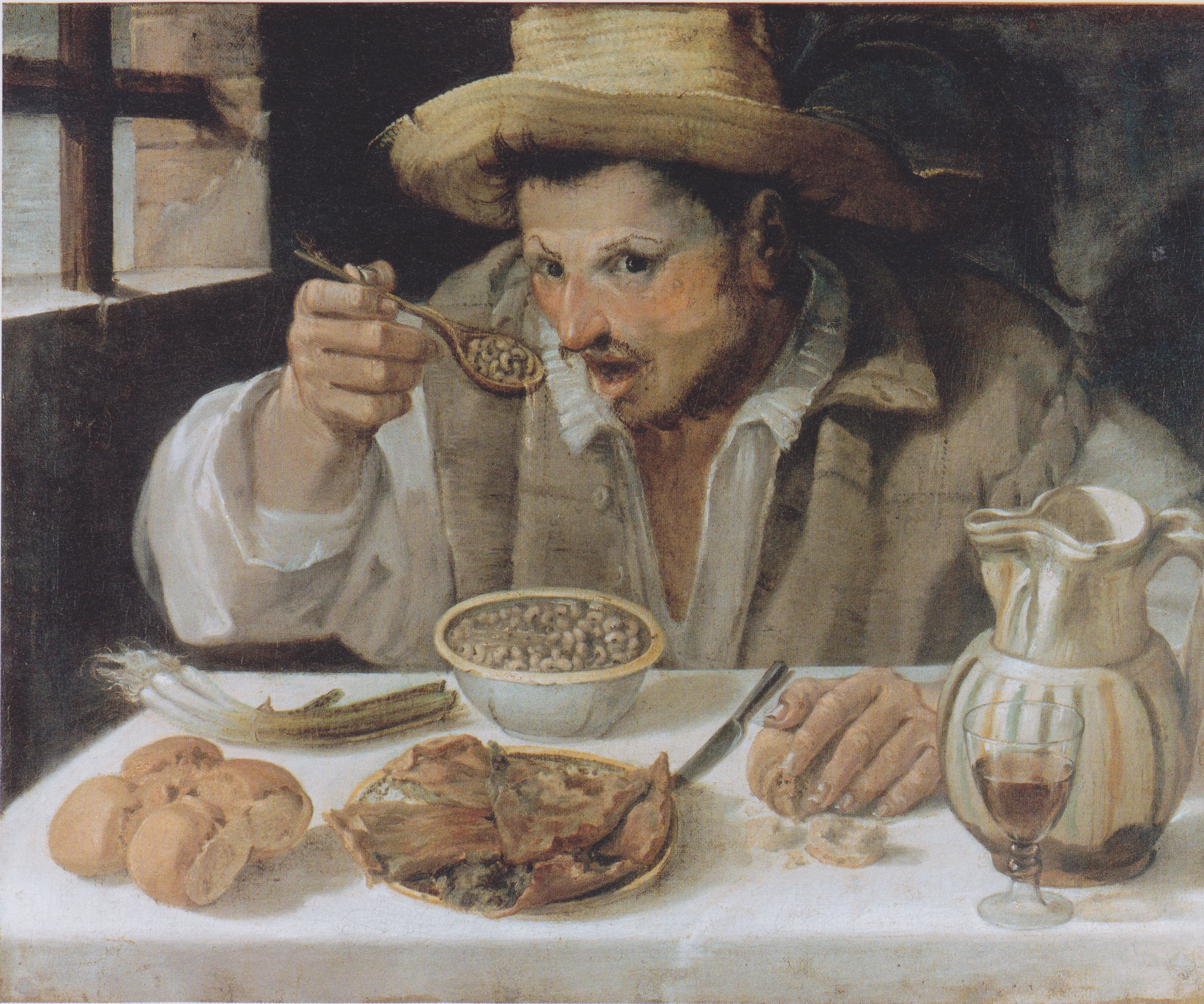
For most of history, wine has been a regular accompaniment to meals. Often the culinary and winemaking traditions of a region would evolve together, creating a natural pairing between the local wine and the local cuisine.

Wine has had a long history of being served as an accompaniment to food. The early history of wine has its origins as another dietary staple and a beverage that was often more sanitary than the local drinking water supply. There is little evidence that much serious thought was given to pairing particular dishes to particular wines with most likely whatever wine was available being used. However, as culinary traditions in a region developed, so too did local winemaking tradition.

Many pairings that are considered "classics" today emerged from the centuries-old relationship between a region's cuisine and their wines. In Europe, lamb was a staple meat of the diet for many areas that today are leading wine regions. The red wines of regions such as Bordeaux, Greece, Rioja, Ribera del Duero, Rhone and Provence are considered classic pairings with the lamb dishes found in the local cuisines of those regions. In Italy, the intimate connection between food and wine is deeply embedded in the culture and is exemplified by the country's wine. Historically, Italians rarely dined without wine and a region's wine was crafted to be "food friendly", often with bright acidity. While some Italian wines may seem tannic, lean or tart by themselves they often exhibit a different profile when paired with boldly flavored Italian foods.

There have been some historical anecdotes that have related to food and wine pairing before modern times. One anecdote often attributed to British wine merchants is "Buy on an apple and sell on cheese" meaning that if a wine tastes good when paired with a raw, uncooked apple it must be truly good and pairing any wine with cheese would make it more palatable to the average consumer and easier to sell. The principles behind this anecdote lies in the food pairing properties of both fruit and cheeses. Fruits that are high in sugar and acidity (such as the malic acid in green apples) can make wines taste metallic and thin bodied. In contrast, hard cheeses such as cheddar can soften the tannins in wines and make them taste fuller and fruitier.

Another historical anecdote, still repeated today, is "White wine with fish; Red wine with meat". The root of this adage rests on the principle of matching the body (weight) of the wine with the weight of the food. Meat was generally heavier and "red" in color so it was assumed that a red wine (which was usually heavier than white wine) paired better. Similarly fish was generally light and "white" in color so it was often paired with white wine. This adage has become outdated somewhat due to the variety of wine styles prevalent in modern winemaking where there are now many "heavy" white wines such as "New World" oaky Chardonnay that can have more body than lighter reds such as Pinot noir or Italian Merlots.

Another older idea was "to pair strong cheeses with strong wines," for example, asiago, a sharply flavored cheese, with Zinfandel, a dark red wine with fruit tones.

=== Modern history ===
In recent years, the popularity and interest in food and wine pairings have increased and taken on new connotations. Industries have sprung up with print publications and media dedicated to expounding on the principles and ideals of pairing the perfect wine with the perfect dish. In the restaurant industry, there is often a dedicated individual or staff of sommeliers who are trained to recommend wine pairings with the restaurant's fare. The origins of this recent phenomenon can be traced to the United States in the 1980s when the wine industry began to advertise wine-drinking as a component of dining rather than as just an alcoholic beverage meant for consumption and intoxication. Winemakers started to emphasize the kind of food dishes that their wines would go well with, some even printing pairing suggestions on back wine labels. Food magazines began to suggest particular wines with recipes and restaurants would offer multi-course dinners matched with a specific wine for each course.

Today there are multiple sources for detailed guidelines and tips on food and wine pairing. But many wine drinkers select wine pairings based on instinct, the mood of the meal or simply a desire to drink a particular wine at the moment they desire to eat a particular meal. The subjective nature of taste makes it possible to drink any kind of wine with any kind of food and have an enjoyable experience. Wine expert Mark Oldman has noted "Food and wine pairing can be like sex and pizza: even when it's bad, it can still be pretty good" and gives the example of wedding cake with a dry sparkling wine. A dry wine with a sweet food is, according to Oldman, "the equivalent of nails on a chalkboard" and is not a "good pairing" according to most guidelines but the atmosphere of the occasion and the subjective nature of taste can trump any rule or guideline. Today, many wine experts and advocates in the realm of food and wine pairing try to focus on the more objective physical aspects of food that have an effect on the palate, altering (or enhancing) the perception of various aspects of the wine.

== Matching weight ==
In food and wine pairings, the most basic element considered is "weight"-the balance between the weight of the food (a heavy, red sauce pasta versus a more delicate salad) and the weight or "body" of the wine (a heavy Cabernet Sauvignon versus a more delicate Pinot grigio). In wine tasting, body is determined primarily by the alcohol level of the wine and can be influenced by the perceptions of tannins (from the grape skins or oak) and extract (the dissolved solids in the wine derived from winemaking processes like extended maceration and sur lie aging). An oaked Chardonnay from a warm wine region, such as Australia is typically "heavier" in body than a stainless steel fermented Chardonnay from a cooler wine region such as Chablis. Pairing heavy wines with light dishes or vice versa, can result in one partner overwhelming the other. The "weight" of a food can also be described in terms of the intensity of its flavors – such as delicate and more subtle flavors versus dishes that have more robust and hearty flavors. A key to pairing upon this principle is to identify the dominant flavor of the dish. Sauces can be the dominant flavor instead of the meat or main component. While poached fish is usually light bodied and better served with a light white, if the fish is served with a heavy cream sauce it could be better balanced with a fuller bodied white wine or light red.

Weight is also especially important when considering the wine style to pair with one of the most classic wine pairing dishes: cheese. Cheeses come in a wide range of flavors and textures, and it is important to consider the qualities of each in order to choose the right wine to pair. Soft, rindless cheeses that have not been aged usually sport a delicate texture and mild, tangy flavor, which go best with dry or even off-dry white wines, along with light-bodied red wines and rosés. For example, fresh mozzarella or burrata can pair well with Italian Pinot Grigio, while a fresh goat cheese pair nicely with Riesling from the Finger Lakes or Germany. Creamy cheeses with a bloomy rind, like Camembert or Brie, are compatible with a traditional method sparkling wine, like Champagne or Cava. The acidity of these wines cuts the richness of the cheese, while the yeasty autolytic aromas and medium body complement the creaminess of the latter. Semi-soft cheeses like Gruyere are best with full-bodied white wines with some oak age, like a Meursault or Viognier. And finally, hard cheeses with some age on them, like a nutty Parmesan or Cheddar tend to go with equally nuanced and nutty Sherry or a full-bodied and complex red wine, like a Bordeaux or Barolo.

=== Weights of wine ===
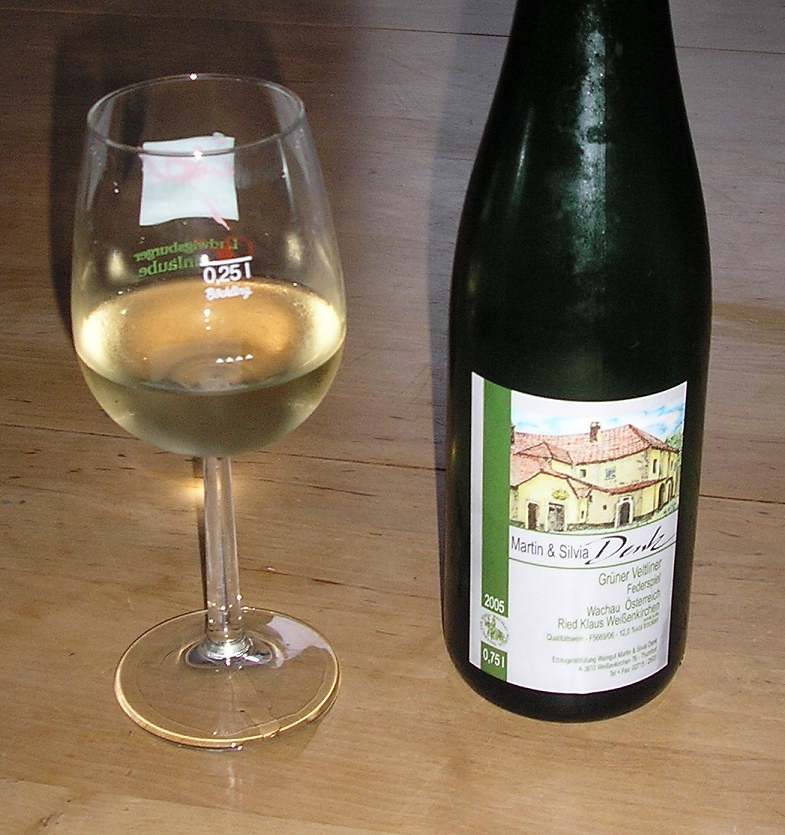
Gruner Veltliner is often made as a light-bodied wine.

Below is a rough guideline of the various weights of wines. Winemaker and regional style as well as oak treatment can cause a wine to be lighter or heavier in body. For example, Pinot noir can vary from being light to more medium bodied. Another example is the influence of regional climates. Warmer climate wine regions tend to produce wines with higher alcohol levels and thus more fuller bodied wines so that a Sauvignon blanc from California may have a heavier weight than a Sauvignon blanc from the Loire.

Lighter whites
Pinot gris, Pinot blanc, Riesling, Sauvignon blanc, Chablis, Champagne and sparkling wines, Gruner Veltliner, Vinho Verde, Muscadet
Medium to heavy whites
Oaked Sauvignon blanc, Alsatian wines, Albarino, White Bordeaux (Semillon), White Burgundy, Rhone whites (Viognier, Roussanne, Marsanne), Tămâioasă Românească and New World Chardonnay
Lighter reds
Beaujolais, Dolcetto, some Pinot noir
Medium reds
Chianti, Barbera, Burgundy, Chinon, Rioja, Cabernet franc, Merlot, Malbec, Zinfandel, some Pinot noir
Heavier reds
Syrah, Brunello di Montalcino, Cabernet Sauvignon, Port, Barbaresco and Barolo

=== Focus of the pairing ===
While a perfect balance where both food and wine are equally enhanced is theoretically possible, typically a pairing has a more enhancing influence on one or the other. Master Sommelier Evan Goldstein notes that food and wine pairing is like two people having a conversation: "One must listen while the other speaks or the result is a muddle". This means either the food or the wine is the dominant focus of the pairing, with the other serving as a complement to enhance the enjoyment of the first. Regarding weight and intensity, if the focus of the pairing is the wine then a more ideal balance would be a food that is slightly lighter in weight to where it does not compete for attention with the wine but not too light to where it is completely overwhelmed. If the focus of the pairing is to highlight a dish then the same thought would apply in pairing a wine.

== Complement and contrast ==
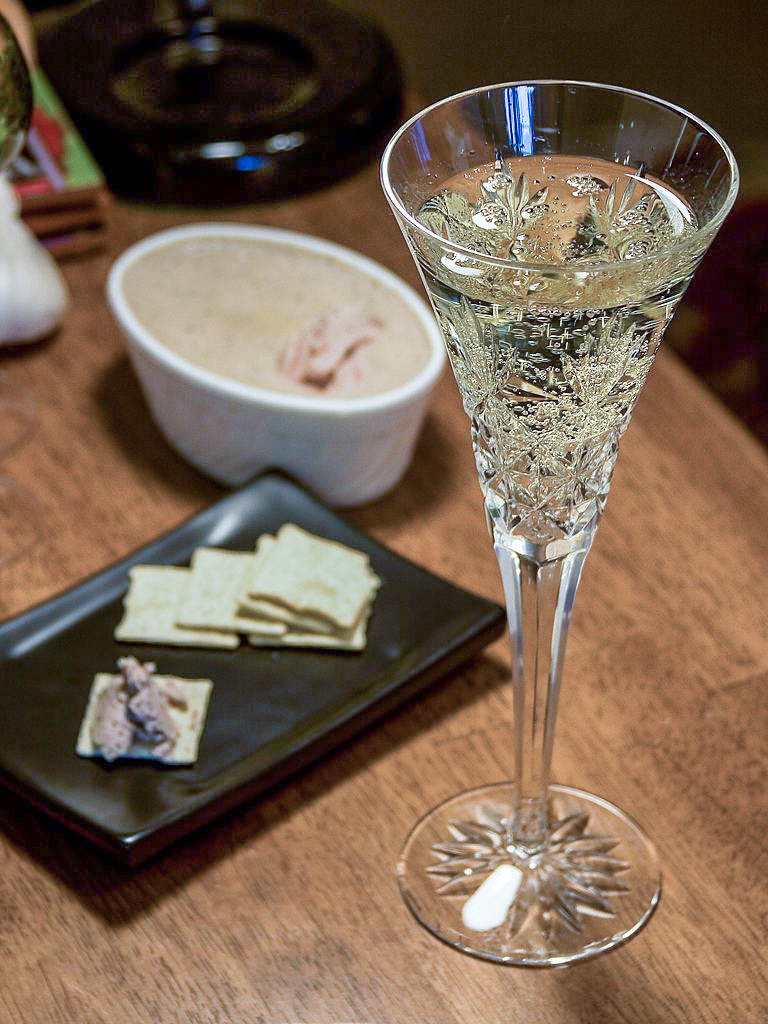
The racy acidity of sparkling wine and the rich texture of foie gras is an example of a contrasting pairing.

After considering weight, pairing the flavors and texture can be dealt with using one of two main strategies — complement or contrast.

The first strategy tries to bring wine together with dishes that complement each other such as an earthy, Burgundian Pinot noir with an earthy, mushroom dish.

The second strategy operates under the truism that "opposites attract" and brings together food and wine that have contrasting traits such as a crisp, acidic Sauvignon blanc and a fish with a creamy lemon sauce. The crisp acidity of the wine serves as a contrast that can cut through the creaminess of the sauce and give a different, refreshing sensation for the palate as opposed to what a complementary pairing, such as a creamy, buttery Chardonnay, would bring. For most of history, the "complementary strategy" was the prevailing thought on food and wine pairing. In the 1980s, as more people started to discover and experiment with pairings, the idea of using contrast started to gain more favor. It follows the same idea that the "salty/sweet" pairing does in cooking (such as salty peanut butter with sweet jelly).

The same food may be complemented or contrasted: a hard, nutty cheese such as Hirtenkase should have "a nutty, slightly sweet wine with it," or a full bodied red wine.

== Physical properties of wine ==
While it is often said that "taste is subjective", there are quantifiable taste characteristics (like bitter, sweet, salty or sour) that can be perceived and measured as low, moderate or high — such as measuring the sweetness of honey or the saltiness of oysters. Flavors, such as butterscotch, char and strawberry, are more personal and can not be quantifiable. Flavors are either perceived to be present or not. The perception of flavors is linked to our sense of smell, while tastes come from the sensory glands of the taste buds. Though individual sensitivity to the different taste "senses" can vary, wine experts often recommend pairings based on these more objective measurements rather than the more subjective concept of "flavors". In wine there are three basic tastes-bitter, sweet and sour. These three tastes can each be identified with a primary component of the wine-tannins (bitter), residual sugar (sweet) and acidity (sour). A fourth component, alcohol, is identified in wine tasting with a perception of "heat" or hotness in the back of the mouth and is the primary factor influencing the body of the wine. The residual heat of the alcohol can be considered in food pairing with some ingredients minimizing the heat of the wine while some accentuating it.

=== Acidity ===
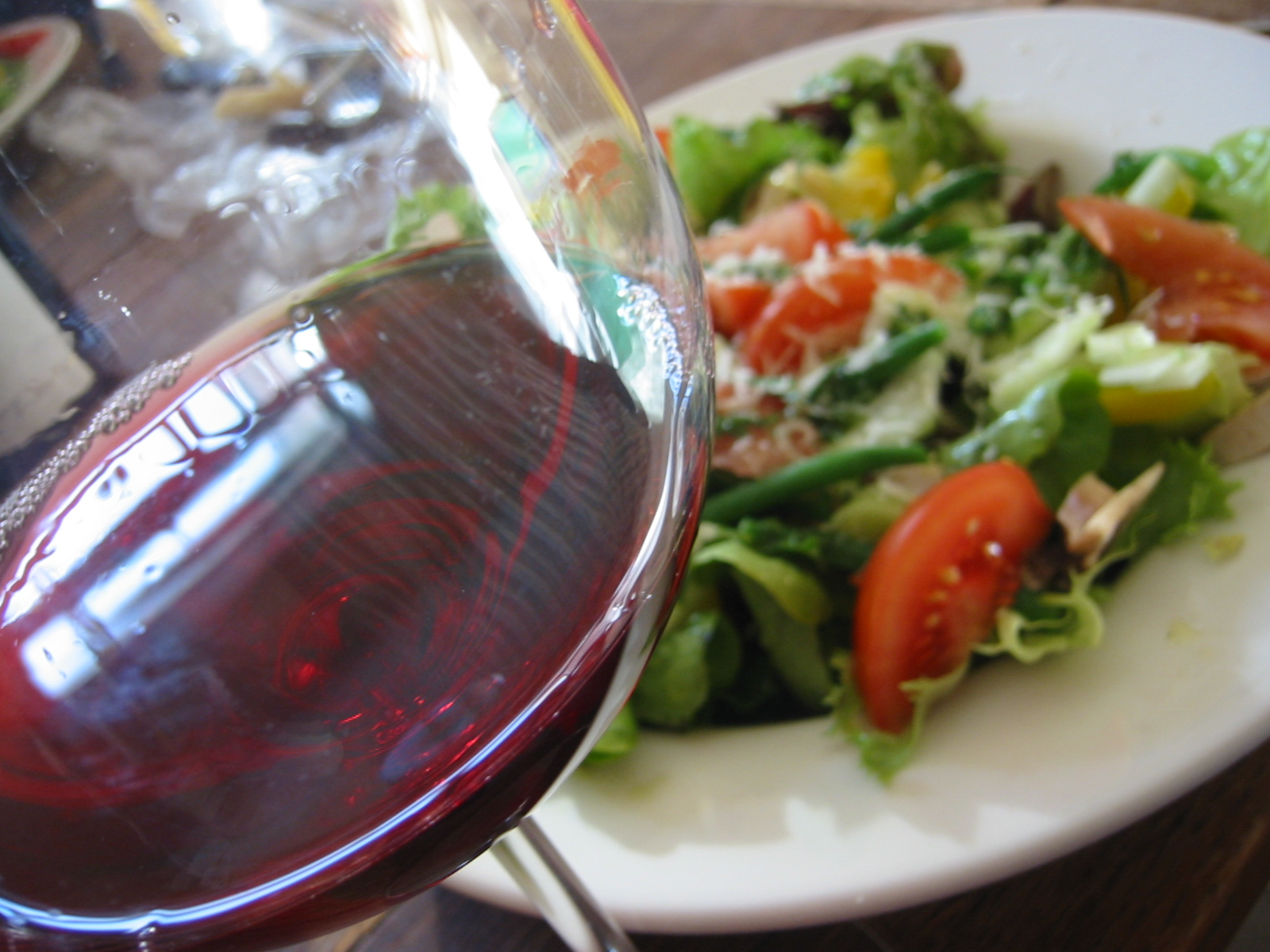
The acidity of salad dressing and tomatoes can cancel some of the tartness in a Beaujolais wine, allowing the fruit to be more noticeable.

Acidity is a dominant player in any food and wine pairing due to the pronounced and complex ways that it can heighten the perception of flavors. In wine tasting, acidity is perceived by a mouth watering response by the salivary glands. This mouth watering can also serve to stimulate the appetite. In wine there are three main acids that have their own associated flavors – malic (green apples), lactic (milky) and tartaric (bitter). In dishes that are fatty, oily, rich or salty, acidity in wine can "cut" (or standout and contrast) through the heaviness and be a refreshing change of pace on the palate. In cooking, acidity is often used in similar fashions such as a lemon wedges with a briny seafood dish such as oysters. The acidity of the lemon juices can make the oysters seem less briny. A wine that is less tart than the dish it is served with may taste thin and weak. A wine that comes across as "too tart" on its own may seem softer when paired with an acidic and tart dish. The complementing "tartness" of the food and wine cancels each other out and allows the other components (fruit of the wine, other flavors of the food) to be more noticeable.

=== Sweetness ===
The sweetness of wines is determined by the amount of residual sugar left in the wine after the fermentation process. Wines can be bone dry (with the sugars fully fermented into alcohol), off-dry (with a hint of sweetness), semi-dry (medium-sweet) and dessert level sweetness (such as the high sugar content in Sauternes and Tokays). Sweet wines often need to be sweeter than the dish they are served with. Vintage brut champagne paired with sweet, wedding cake can make the wine taste tart and weak while the cake may have off flavors. In food pairings, sweetness balances spice and heat. It can serve as a contrast to the heat and alleviate some of the burning sensation caused by peppers and spices, e.g. in Thai or Sichuan cuisine. It can accentuate the mild sweetness in some foods and can also contrast with salt such as the European custom of pairing salty Stilton cheese with a sweet Port. Sweetness in a wine can balance tartness in food, especially if the food has some sweetness (such as dishes with sweet and sour sauces).

=== Bitterness ===
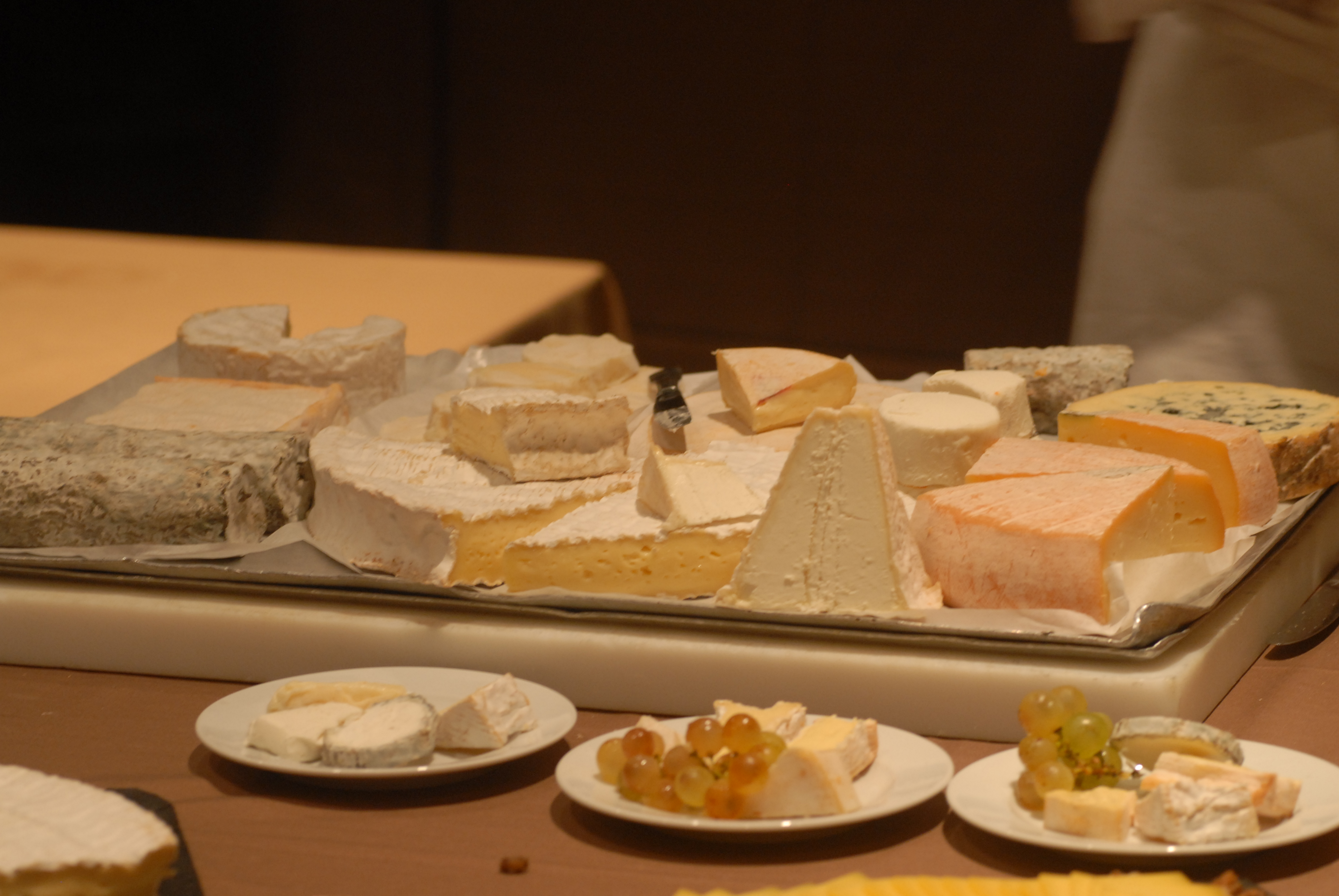
The proteins and fats in cheese can soften the perception of tannins in wine, making a wine seem less bitter and more fruity.

The astringency associated with wine is usually derived from a wine's tannins. Tannins add a gritty texture and chalky, astringent taste. It can enhance the perception of "body" or weight in the wine. Tannins are normally derived from the skins, seeds, and stems of the grapes themselves (leached out during the maceration process) or from contact with oak during barrel aging. Tannins react with proteins. When paired with dishes that are high in proteins and fats (such as red meat and hard cheeses), the tannins bind to the proteins and come across as softer. In the absence of protein from the food, such as some vegetarian dishes, the tannins react with the proteins on the tongue and sides of the mouth – accentuating the astringency and having a drying effect on the palate. Various cooking methods, such as grilling and blackening can add a bitter "char" component to the dish that allows it to play well with a tannic wine, while fish oils can make tannic wines taste metallic or off. Astringent tannic wines like Barolo and Cabernet Sauvignon can overwhelm a lot of foods but can be softened by fatty foods with a lot of proteins such as hard cheeses or meats. The dry tannins also serve as a cleansing agent on the palate by binding to the grease and oils left over in the mouth. Spicy and sweet foods can accentuate the dry, bitterness of tannins and make the wine seem to have off flavors.

=== Alcohol ===
Alcohol is the primary factor in dictating a wine's weight and body. Typically the higher the alcohol level, the more weight the wine has. An increase in alcohol content increases the perception of density and texture. In food and wine pairing, salt and spicy heat accentuates the alcohol and the perception of "heat" or hotness in the mouth. Conversely, the alcohol can also magnify the heat of spicy food, making a highly alcoholic wine paired with a spicy dish generate significant heat for the taster.

== Other pairing principles ==
Beyond the basic guidelines listed above, food pairings can dive even further into matching several layers of texture and flavors. The term "bridge ingredients" refers to ingredients and flavors that have certain affinities in wine pairing (such as slow-cooked onions with creamy wines, etc.). It can also refer to using particular herbs and spices perceived in the wine (such as rosemary in some Cabernet Sauvignon) and adding them to the dish as an ingredient. Their presence in a dish may increase the likelihood that the certain wines would pair well.

The above principles can be used for pairing wines with Asian cuisine. Pair for the flavor of the dish – whatever the 'main ingredient' may be – it is not the meat, seafood, or vegetables that stand out as the predominant flavor. Rather the true flavor of the dish is determined by the cooking method (for example, the toasty flavors of a stir fry), the sauce (from curries to sweet-and-sour), the use of seasonings (such as ginger and coriander leaves to mask fishy tastes), or the blending of ingredients to form new flavors (as in sukiyaki or satay). Indeed, it may result from a combination of any of these elements. Also, note that in the case of an Asian meal, several dishes are served at the same time and are shared by everyone present. The wine chosen for such a meal has to be versatile.

== See also ==
- Food pairing
- Wine sauce
