= Nieheim =

- Town
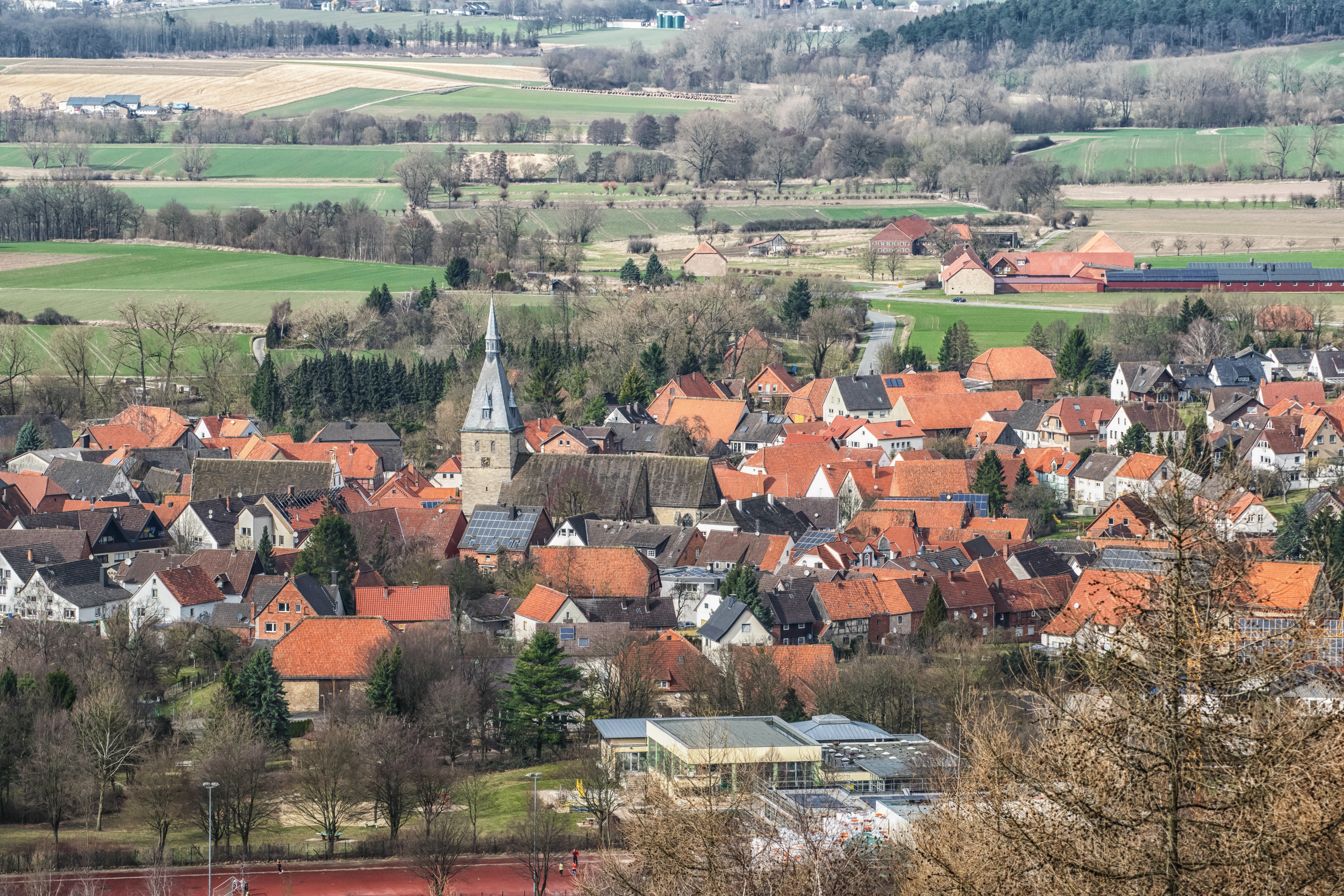

- Flag Coat of arms

- Location of Nieheim within Höxter district
- Interactive map of Nieheim
- Location within Germany Location within North Rhine-Westphalia
- Coordinates: 51°47′59″N 09°06′35″E
- Country: Germany
- State: North Rhine-Westphalia
- Admin. region: Detmold
- District: Höxter
- Subdivisions: 10

Government
  - Mayor (2020–25): Johannes Schlütz (Ind.)

Area
  - Total: 79.71 km^{2} (30.78 sq mi)
- Elevation: 243 m (797 ft)

Population (2025-12-31)
  - Total: 6,031
  - Density: 75.66/km^{2} (196.0/sq mi)
- Time zone: UTC+01:00 (CET)
  - Summer (DST): UTC+02:00 (CEST)
- Postal codes: 33039
- Dialling codes: 05274
- Vehicle registration: HX
- Website: www.nieheim.de

Nieheim (German: [ˈniːˌhaɪm]) is a town in Höxter district in North Rhine-Westphalia, Germany. Historical names of Nieheim are: Nihem, Nyem, and Nym. The town covers an area of about 80 km^{2} and has about 6,250 inhabitants.

== Geography ==
Nieheim lies roughly 10 km northeast of Brakel.

=== Constituent communities ===
Nieheim consists of the following 10 centres:

- Entrup
- Eversen
- Erwitzen
- Himmighausen
- Holzhausen
- Merlsheim
- Nieheim
- Oeynhausen
- Schönenberg
- Sommersell mit Kariensiek

== History ==
Nieheim, with its more than 750-year-old history reaches well back into the Middle Ages. From its beginnings as a community, it grew after being granted municipal privileges (lower court rights, market rights and minting rights, among others) in Bishop Bernhard IV's time (1228–1247), into today's town of Nieheim. After quickly developing from a former farming town and Hanseatic member, Nieheim has risen today to be a climatic spa with a function as a minor centre, and a mediaeval town with flair.

== Population ==
Historical population

Year	Pop.	±% p.a.
1965	6,119	—
1970	6,361	+0.78%
1975	6,353	−0.03%
1980	6,533	+0.56%
1985	6,351	−0.56%
1990	6,725	+1.15%
1995	7,114	+1.13%

Year	Pop.	±% p.a.
2000	7,087	−0.08%
2005	7,001	−0.24%
2010	6,557	−1.30%
2015	6,254	−0.94%
2020	6,026	−0.74%
2025	6,031	+0.02%

Source: Landesdatabank Nordrhein-Westfalen

== Politics ==
=== Town council ===
Town council's 24 seats are apportioned as follows, in accordance with municipal elections held on 26 September 2004:

- CDU 13 seats
- SPD 7 seats
- FDP 1 seat
- UWG 3 seats

Note: UWG is a citizens' coalition.

=== Coat of arms ===
Nieheim's civic coat of arms might heraldically be described thus: In gules a cross Or, in each quarter an orb Or.

These arms date from 1591 at the latest, and the colours are those borne by the old Prince-Bishopric of Paderborn, among whose many holdings was Nieheim. The orbs stand for Saint Nicholas, the town's patron saint.

The coat of arms was granted on 18 July 1908.

== Economy and infrastructure ==
=== Transport ===
Owing to Nieheim's advantageous location on the north–south-running East Westphalia Road (Ostwestfalenstraße), otherwise known as Federal Highway (Bundesstraße) B252, connections to Autobahnen A 2 (Hanover-Ruhr area) and A 44 (Dortmund-Kassel) are right at hand.

Nieheim is also easily reached by public transport. The nearest railway stations are Steinheim, Brakel and Altenbeken.

=== Education ===
Nieheim has 3 kindergartens, 3 primary schools, a Hauptschule and a Realschule (Peter-Hille-Realschule).

== Culture and sightseeing ==
=== Buildings ===
Among the town's buildings that are most worthy of a visit are the Town Hall, built in 1610 in the Weser Renaissance style, the Ratskrug from 1712, a stately half-timbered building, and the Richterhaus ("Judge House"), built in 1701.

The Catholic Parish Church of Saint Nicholas with its artistically relief-decorated baptismal font and late Gothic little sacramental house has parts that were built as early as the 13th century.

The Protestant Church of the Cross (Kreuzkirche) was built in a neo-Gothic style in 1868–1869.

The Gut Holzhausen estate is a biodynamic farm and the venue for a summer festival called Voices.

=== "Holsterturm" landmark ===
As Nieheim's landmark, the Holsterturm (tower) on a nearby bank south of the main town, can look back on a 700-year history.

=== Mediaeval vault system ===
Unique in Westphalia is the vault system through which runs the Nikolausbach (brook), which rises below the Holsterberg (mountain) and runs through the middle of town in this mediaeval vault system.

=== Weberhaus Nieheim ===
The Weberhaus Nieheim, the former residence of the doctor, poet and politician Friedrich Wilhelm Weber, today houses a Kolping diocesan training centre and a Heimvolkshochschule, which provides facilities for various forms of training work and is equipped with modern technical equipment.

Also, the Pan-German Education Centre of Youth in Europe (Gesamtdeutsche Bildungsstätte der Deutschen Jugend in Europa) in Nieheim-Himmighausen offers extensive seminars for groups geared towards various ends.

=== Nieheimer Flechthecke ===
Typical of countryside scenery around Nieheim is what is called Flechthecke, meaning, roughly, "braided hedge". The hedges themselves are mostly – about 80% – hazelnut growth, all planted in a row. Here and there are found the odd hawthorn and single wild roses. Trimmed willow trees, about 2 m high, serve as living fenceposts to keep the hedges steady. Young withes are taken from these willows to do the braiding. If dairy cows or horses are to be kept in the paddock ringed by one of these braided hedges, blackthorn twigs are also tied onto the inside to thwart any nibbling. A finished hedge has a height of roughly 1.5 m and is braided in three layers.

=== Telegraph station no. 32 ===
As a relic of an almost forgotten communication technology, a reconstructed optical telegraph station still stands high over the countryside near Oeynhausen. This is run by the Oeynhausen history club (Heimatverein), and guided tours are available.

=== Culinary specialities ===
In Nieheim, a kind of cheese is made, Nieheimer Käse (Nieheim cheese), a sour milk cheese nowadays made by only one cheesemaker. It had almost been forgotten, but is now becoming better known thanks to tourism. It is ripened in wooden moulds in a warm place and then seasoned with salt and caraway. Depending on the ripening time, it can be a Handkäse, a cooking cheese or a hard grating cheese.

=== Regular events ===
==== Deutscher Käsemarkt ====
The "German Cheese Market" is held every other year – in even-numbered years – and draws cheesemakers from all over the world who make their cheeses the old way, by hand, presenting their finished products.

In 2004, the Fourth German Cheese Market drew more than 70,000 visitors to Nieheim. In 2006, the German Cheese Market is to be held on 1–3 September.

==== Nieheimer Holztage ====
The "Nieheim Wood Days" are held every other year – in odd-numbered years – and everything at this event revolves around the themes "wood, forest and nature".

==== Nieheimer Kulturnacht ====
The "Nieheim Culture Night" is held on the day when the clocks are advanced from standard time to summer time.

==== Nieheimer Chorfestival ====
Choirs from all over Germany come to Nieheim for the Choir Festival to train their voices.

==== Nieheimer Rosenmontagsumzug ====
Nieheim considers itself a stronghold of East Westphalian carnival custom, and the Rosenmontagsumzug – a colourful parade – is the high point of the season.

== Personalities ==
=== Sons and daughters of the town ===
In the ecclesiastical field, Dietrich von Nieheim (1338/48 - 1418), who served three popes and was held in high regard in the Roman Curia, achieved international recognition, if not outright fame. This is also said of Hugo Makibi Enomiya-Lassalle (1898–1990), a Jesuit priest, a religious philosopher, a meditation teacher and the builder of the Peace Church in Hiroshima born on the Externbrock estate near Nieheim. His life's work is the development of the Japanese Zen practice as a way to a deep belief experience for Christians.

- Wilhelm Hillebrand (1821–1886) was a botanist and a physician.
- Jürgen Jasperneite (born 1964) is an electrical engineer and a professor.
