= Apfelwein =

German apple cider

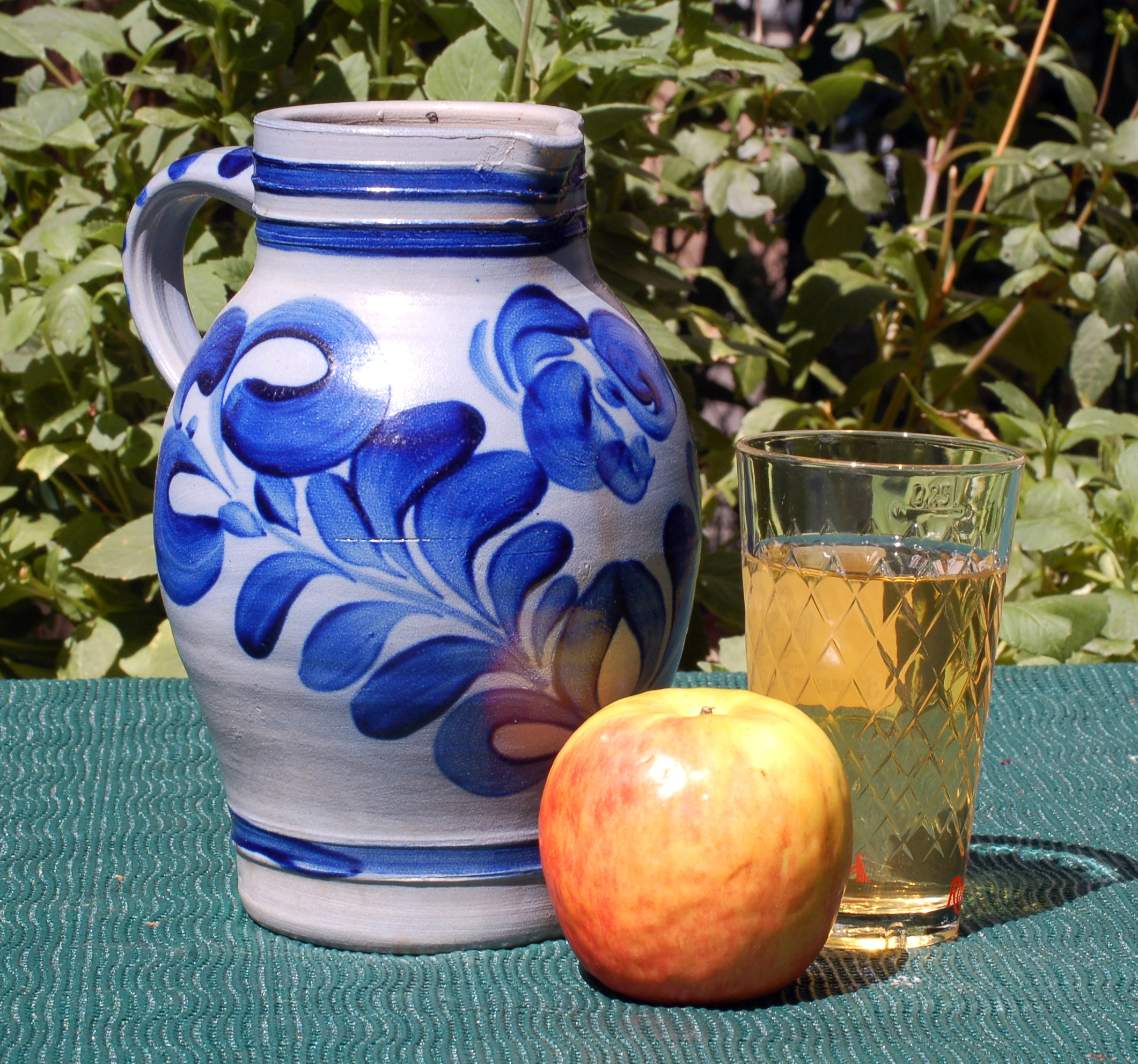
Apfelwein with Bembel

Apfelwein (German: [ˈʔapfl̩vaɪn]; lit. 'apple wine'), or Viez (German: [fiːts], Moselfranken, Saarland, Trier; lit. 'vice') or Most (German: [mɔst], Austria, Switzerland, South Germany; lit. 'must') are German words for cider. German ciders are made from various kinds of sour tasting apples (such as "Bohnapfel") and are distinguished by an alcohol content of 4.8–7.0% alongside a tart, sour taste.

Apfelwein is also regionally known as Ebbelwoi, Stöffsche, Apfelmost (apple must), Viez (from Latin vice, the second or substitute wine), and saurer Most (sour must, Süßmost or sweet must is essentially apple juice). Instead of the name Apfelwein, restaurants and smaller manufacturers may instead call the beverage Schoppen or Schoppe, which actually refers to the measure of the glass.

In the Frankfurt area, berries from the service tree (Sorbus domestica) may be added in small quantities to increase astringency, in which case the specific type of Apfelwein is called Speierling. In modern times, the term Speierling is often used to refer to any sourer variety of Apfelwein, even if it lacks juice from the service tree.

== Production ==
Apfelwein is made from pressed apples. The juice or must is fermented with yeast to produce an alcoholic beverage usually around 6% ABV. It can be made by adding the unprocessed juice from the fruit of a small, indigenous tree known as Speierling (Sorbus domestica) or Speyerling, an endangered species that is easily confused with the wild apple.

Apfelwein is mainly produced and consumed in Hesse (where it is the state beverage), particularly in the Frankfurt, Wetterau, and Odenwald areas. It is also found in Moselfranken, Merzig (Saarland), and the Trier area, as well as the lower Saar area and the region bordering on Luxembourg. Several large producers are located in these regions, as well as numerous small, private producers that use traditional recipes. Some of the most famous restaurants serving Apfelwein are in Sachsenhausen (Frankfurt am Main). Some of these regions have regular cider competitions and fairs, in which the small, private producers participate. Cider songs are composed and sung at these events. The Merzig region crowns a "Viez Queen", and the lower Saar area a "Viez King".

== Culture ==
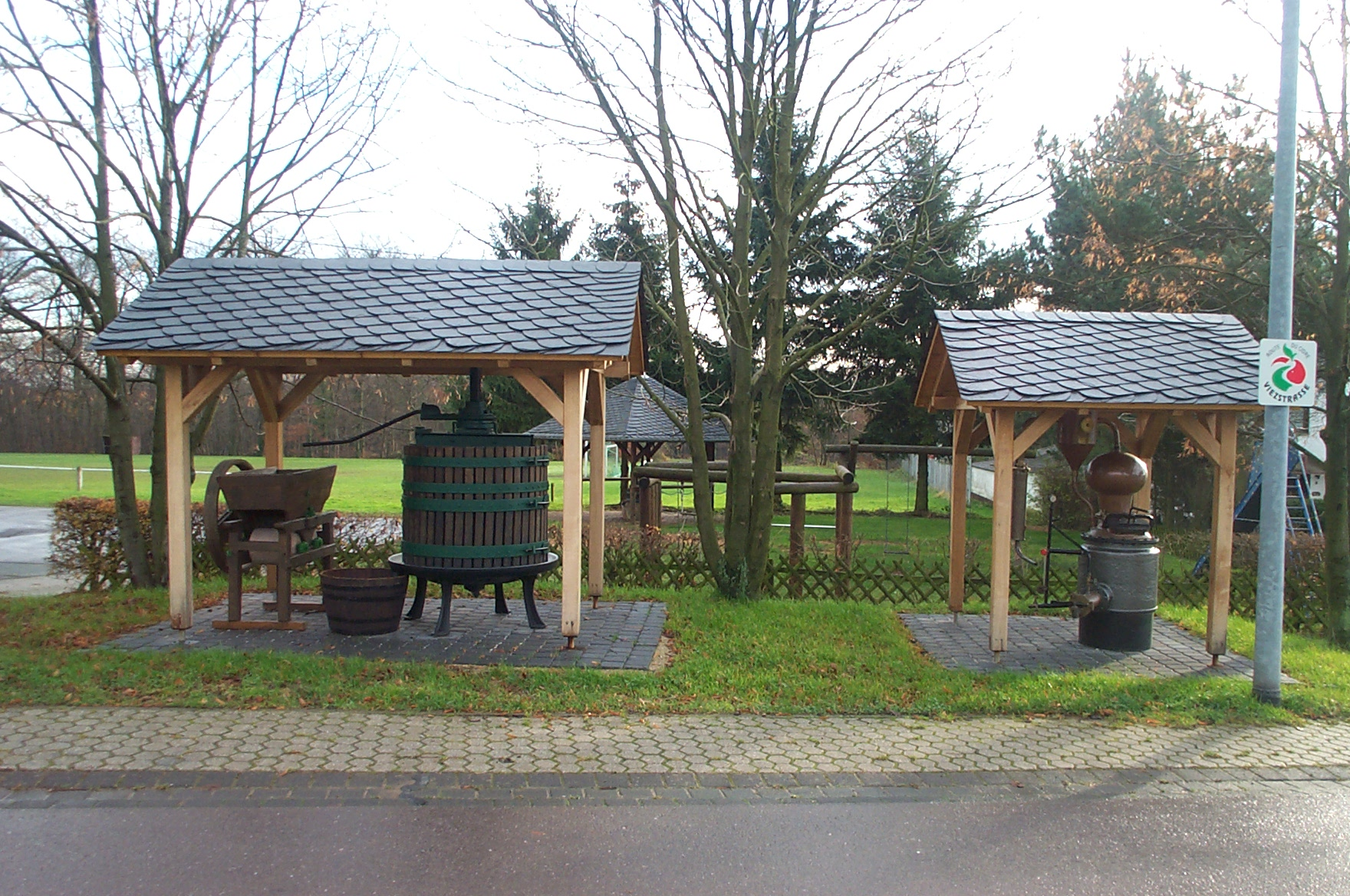
Cider-making equipment on display along Viezstraße

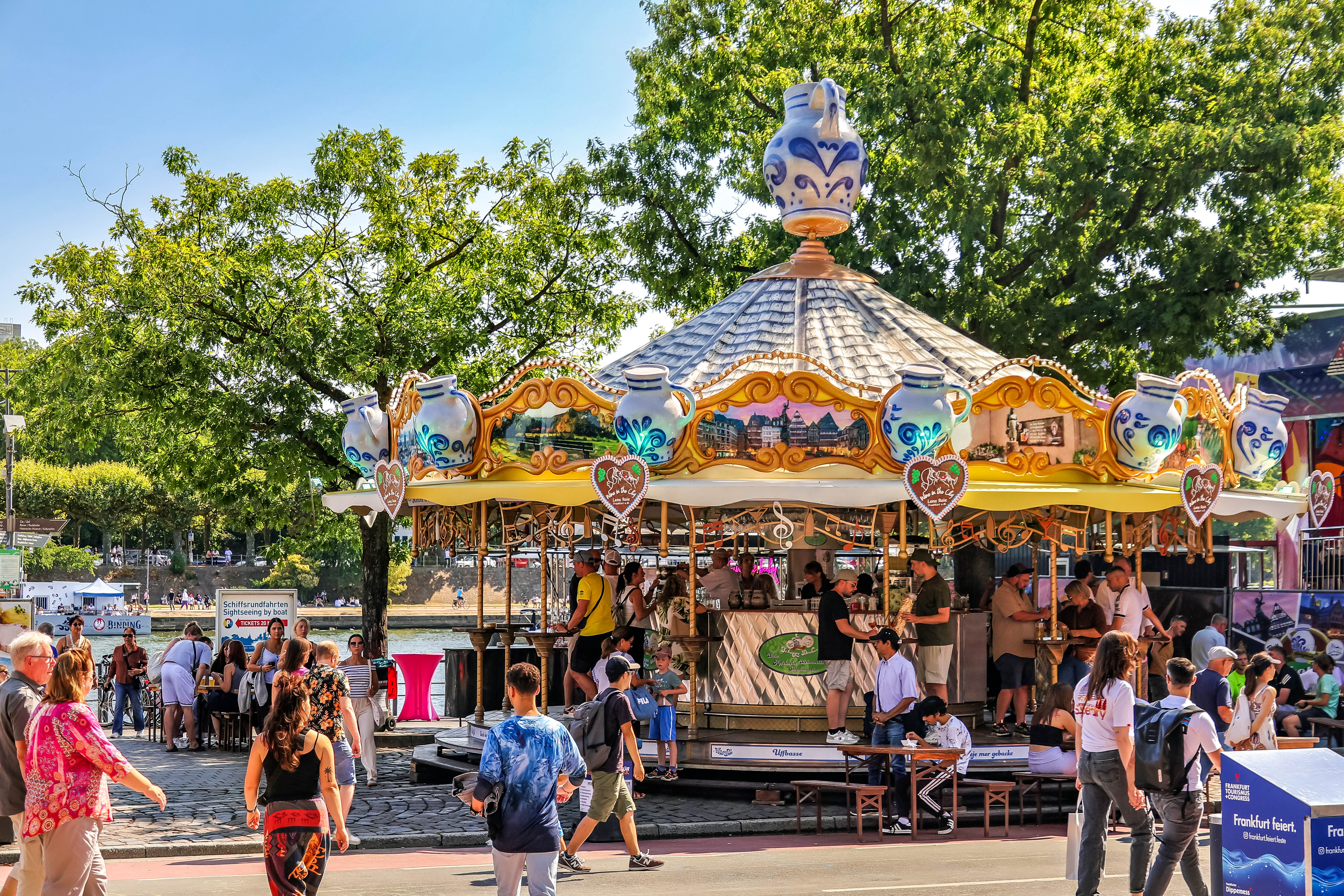
Apfelwein carousel bar in Frankfurt

Apfelwein is served in a Geripptes, a glass with a lozenge-shaped cut that refracts light and improves grip—a holdover from a time when some meals were traditionally eaten without cutlery. Traditional Apfelwein restaurants serve a "proper" 0.30-litre (10-oz) serving, although some establishments may also have a 0.25-l or 0.50-l version of the glass. A Geripptes filled with Apfelwein is also called a Schoppen (mainly in Frankfurt and the surrounding areas)

Most establishments also serve Apfelwein in a Bembel (a specific Apfelwein jug), much like beer is sold by the pitcher in many countries. The paunchy Bembel (made from salt-glazed stoneware) usually has a basic grey colour with blue-painted detailing. In the Eifel region, near Hunsrück, around Moseltal, along the lower Saar, and in Trier, the drinking container is called Viezporz and is made of white porcelain or stoneware.

Hot Apfelwein is commonly used as a traditional home remedy for colds or as a warming beverage in the cold season. The Apfelwein is heated and served with a cinnamon stick, possibly with cloves and a slice of orange, much like mulled wine.

An official Viez route (Route du Cidre) connects Saarburg with the border to Luxembourg. An annual Viez Fest is celebrated in Merzig. The date is usually the second Saturday in October.

== See also ==
- Fruit wine
- Handkäse mit Musik
