= Handkäse =

German sour-milk cheese

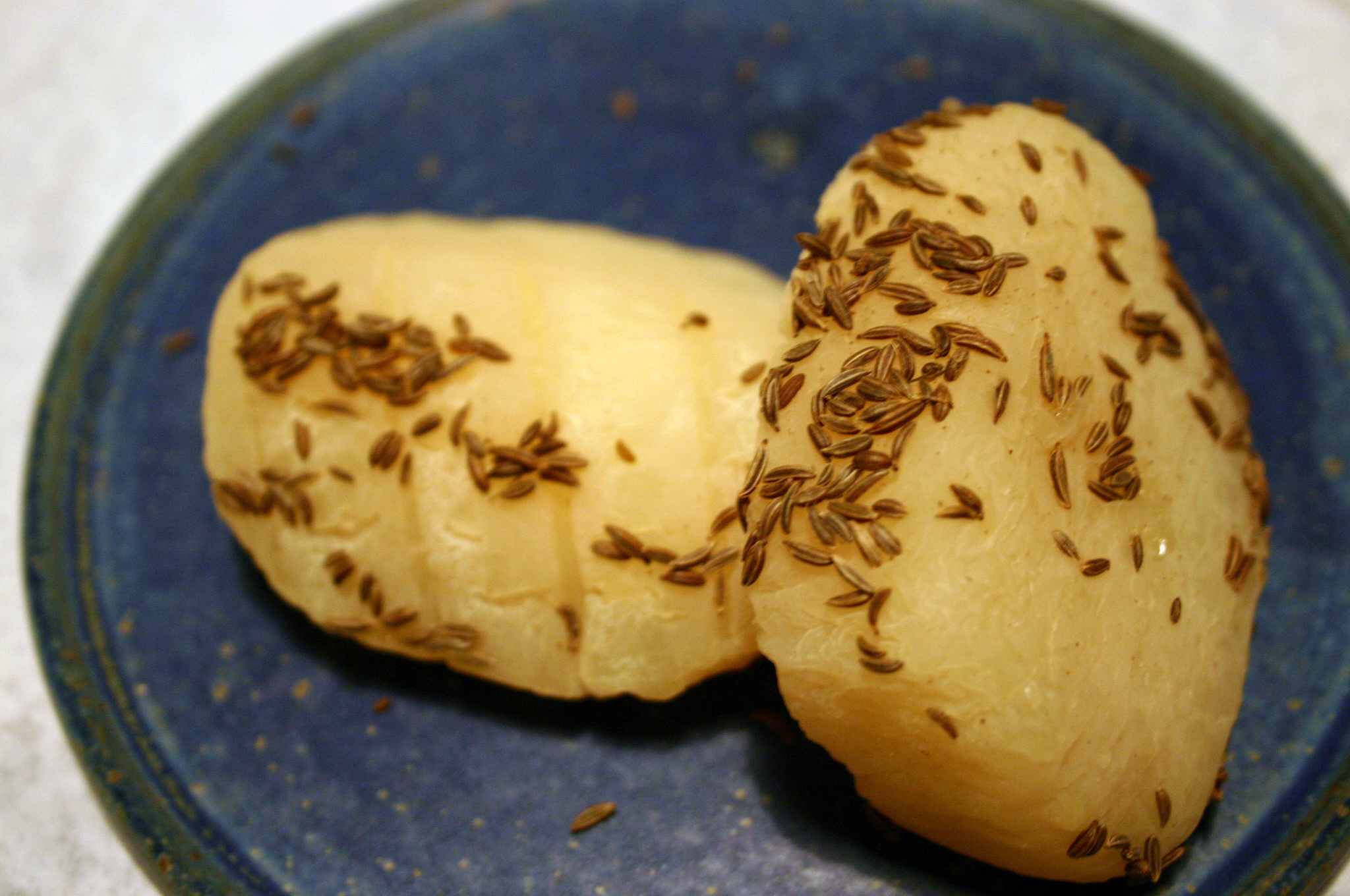
- Other names: Handkäs
- Country of origin: Germany
- Region: Hesse
- Town: Frankfurt-am-Main
- Source of milk: Cow
- Texture: Soft but firm
- Fat content: 1.1% to 2.3%
- Protein content: 26.6% to 37.7%
- Certification: PGI (Hessischer Handkäse)

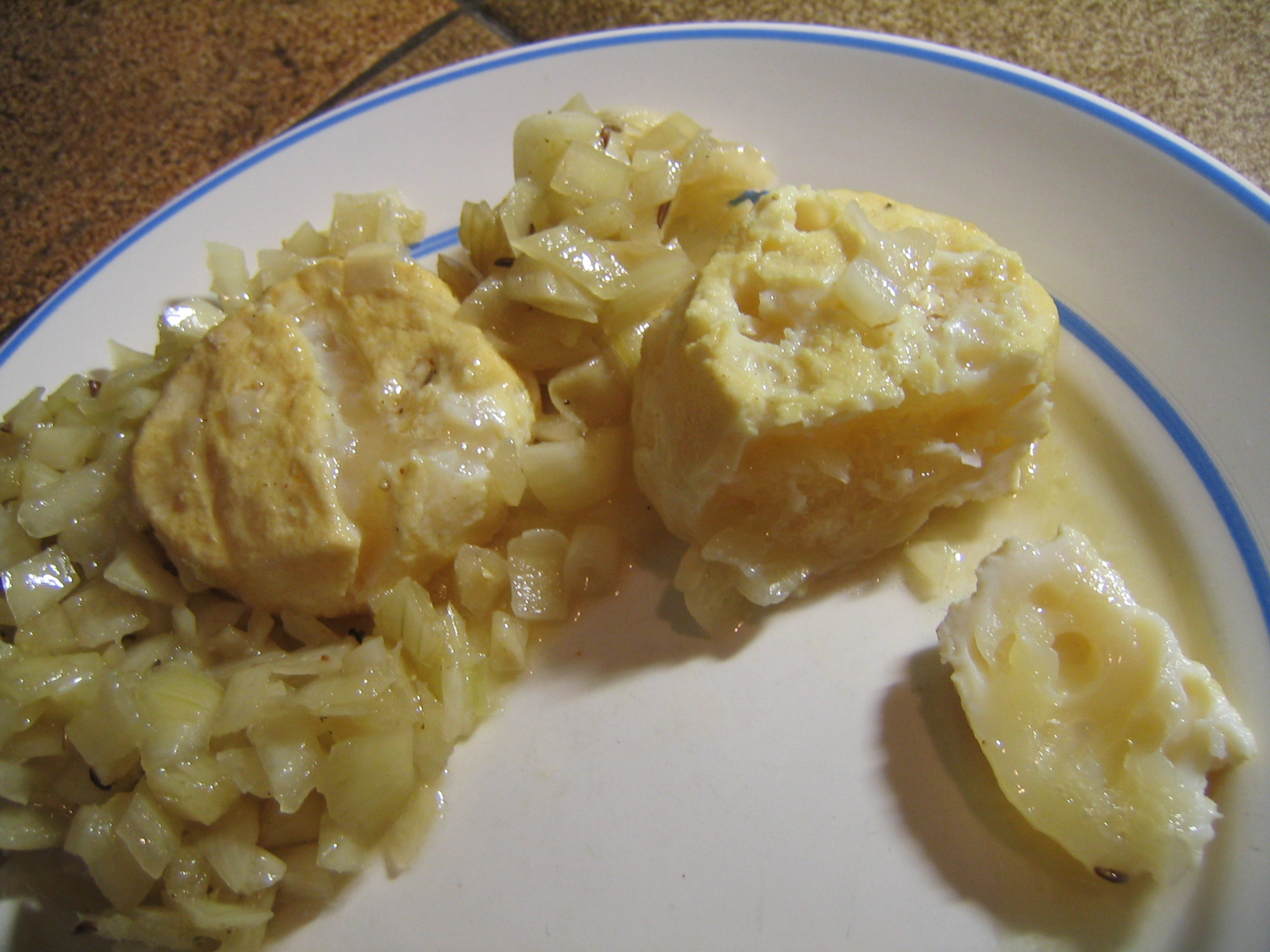
Handkäs mit Musik (Hessian: Handkäse with music); marinated Handkäse

Handkäse (pronounced [ˈhantkɛːzə]; literally: "hand cheese") is a German regional sour milk cheese (similar to Harzer) and is a culinary specialty of Frankfurt am Main, Offenbach am Main, Darmstadt, Langen, and other parts of southern Hesse. It gets its name from the traditional way of producing it: forming it with one's own hands.

Handkäse is a small, translucent, yellow cheese. It has a pungent aroma, and a sour taste.

Handkäse is traditionally topped with chopped or sliced onions, locally known as "Handkäse mit Musik" (literally: hand cheese with music). It is usually eaten with caraway on it, or served on the side. Some Hessians say that it is a sign of the quality of the establishment when caraway is in a separate dispenser. As a sign of this, many restaurants have a little pot for caraway seeds.

The "music" Handkäse is supposed to be served with is often said to "come later". This is a euphemism for the flatulence that raw onions can provide during digestion. Another explanation for the "music" is that the flasks of vinegar and oil customarily provided with the cheese would supposedly strike a musical note when they hit each other. Another theory is that it was coined because, during the marinating process, the resulting gases rising up through the vinegar-oil mixture often produce a bubbling noise.

== Serving ==
Handkäse is often served as an appetizer. Apfelwein is traditionally served with Handkäse. White wine, usually dry, is also preferred in some areas, such as Rheinhessen.

== See also ==
- German cuisine
- List of German cheeses
- List of cheeses
