= Rauchkäse =

German semi-soft smoked cheese

Rauchkäse (smoke cheese) is a German variety of smoked cheese, known for being semi-soft with a smoky brown rind. The most famous variety is Bruder Basil, named for dairy entrepreneur Basil Weixler, whose dairy company is still in operation today. It is typically smoked using birch or spruce woods.

== See also ==
- List of cheeses § Germany
- German cuisine
- List of German cheeses
- List of cheeses
- List of smoked foods
