= Allgäu =

Geographic region of southern Germany

Coordinates: 47°45′N 10°10′E

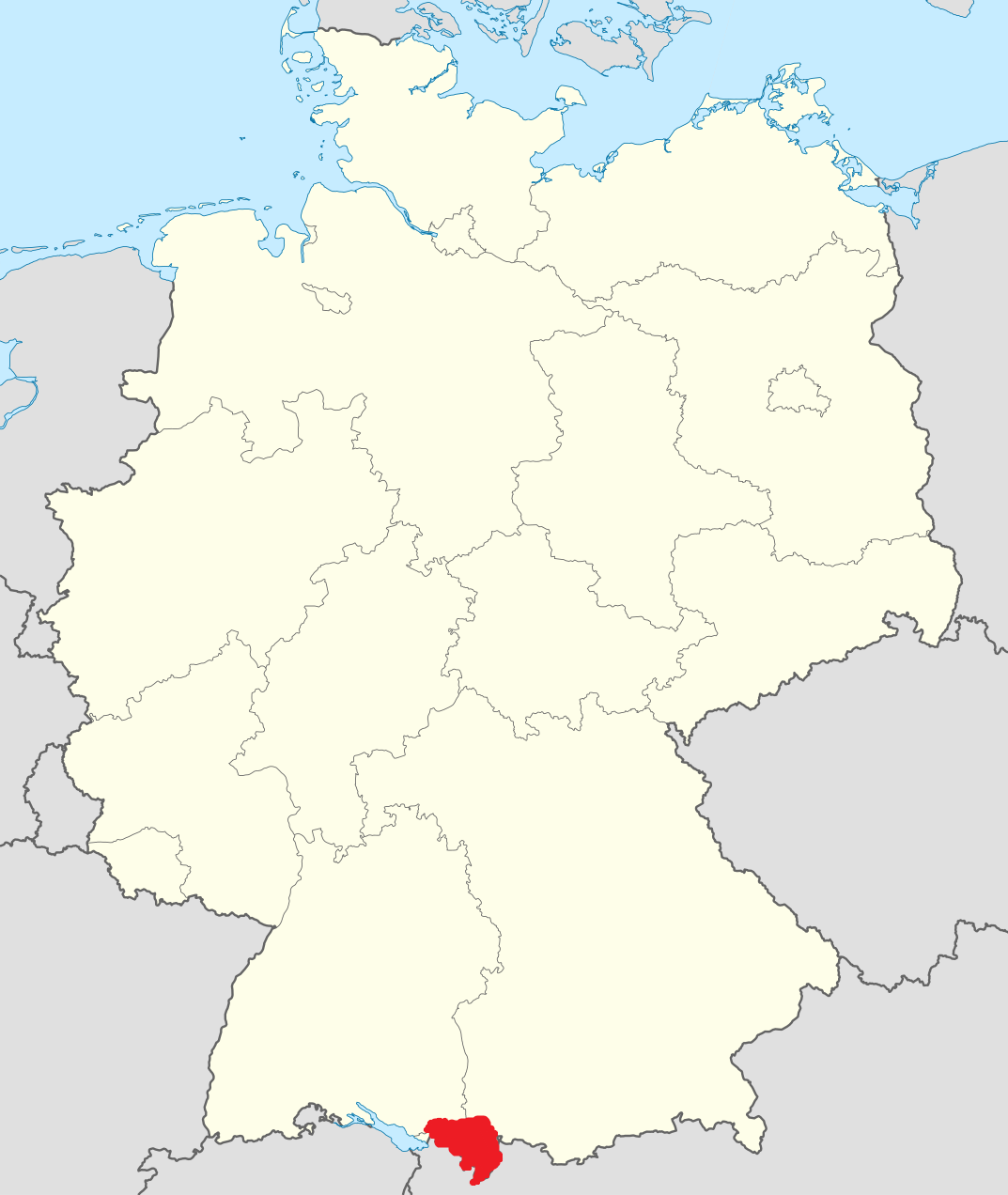
Location of Allgäu in Germany (red)

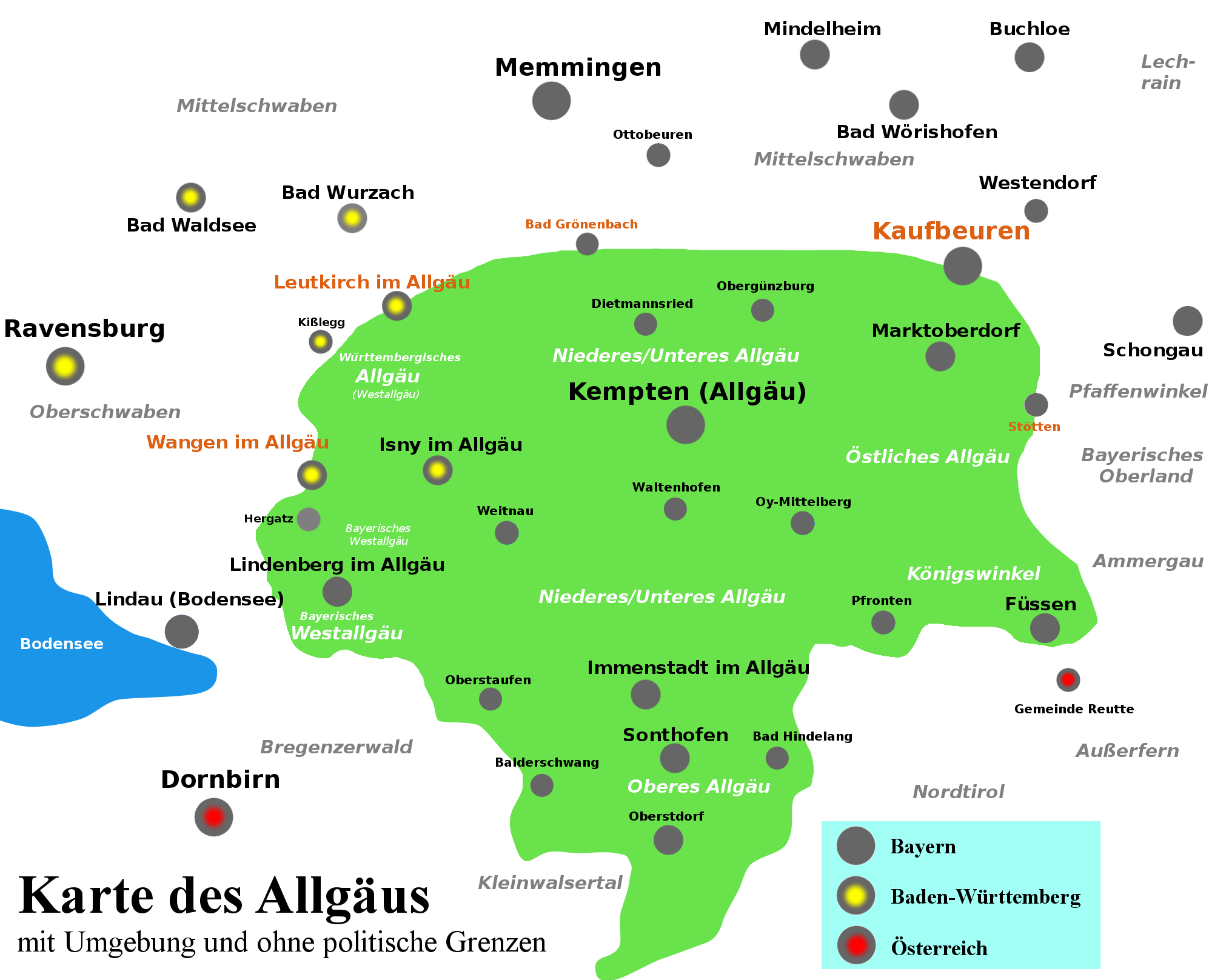
Map of the Allgäu. Grey: cities in Bavaria; red: cities in Austria; yellow: cities in Baden-Württemberg

The Allgäu (Standard German: [ˈalɡɔʏ]) is a region in Swabia in southern Germany. It covers the south of Bavarian Swabia, southeastern Baden-Württemberg, and parts of Austria. The region stretches from the pre-alpine lands up to the Alps. The main rivers flowing through the Allgäu are the Lech and Iller. Allgäu is not an administrative unit.

The alpine regions of the Allgäu rise over 2,000 metres in elevation and are popular for winter skiing. The area is notable for its beautiful landscapes and is popular for vacations and therapeutic stays. It is well known in Germany for its farm produce, especially dairy products including Hirtenkäse ("herdsman's cheese") and Bergkäse ("mountain cheese").

Besides tourism and dairy products, another important economic sector is the building of industrial equipment and machines. Fendt tractors, developed and produced in Marktoberdorf are one of the most famous products of the region. The castle of Neuschwanstein in Hohenschwangau is in the eastern part of the Allgäu.

The Allgäu is dominated in the south by the Allgäu Alps. The Allgäu is formed mainly by glaciers and glacial debris. Many hills and lakes are remnants of former glaciers.

== Gallery ==
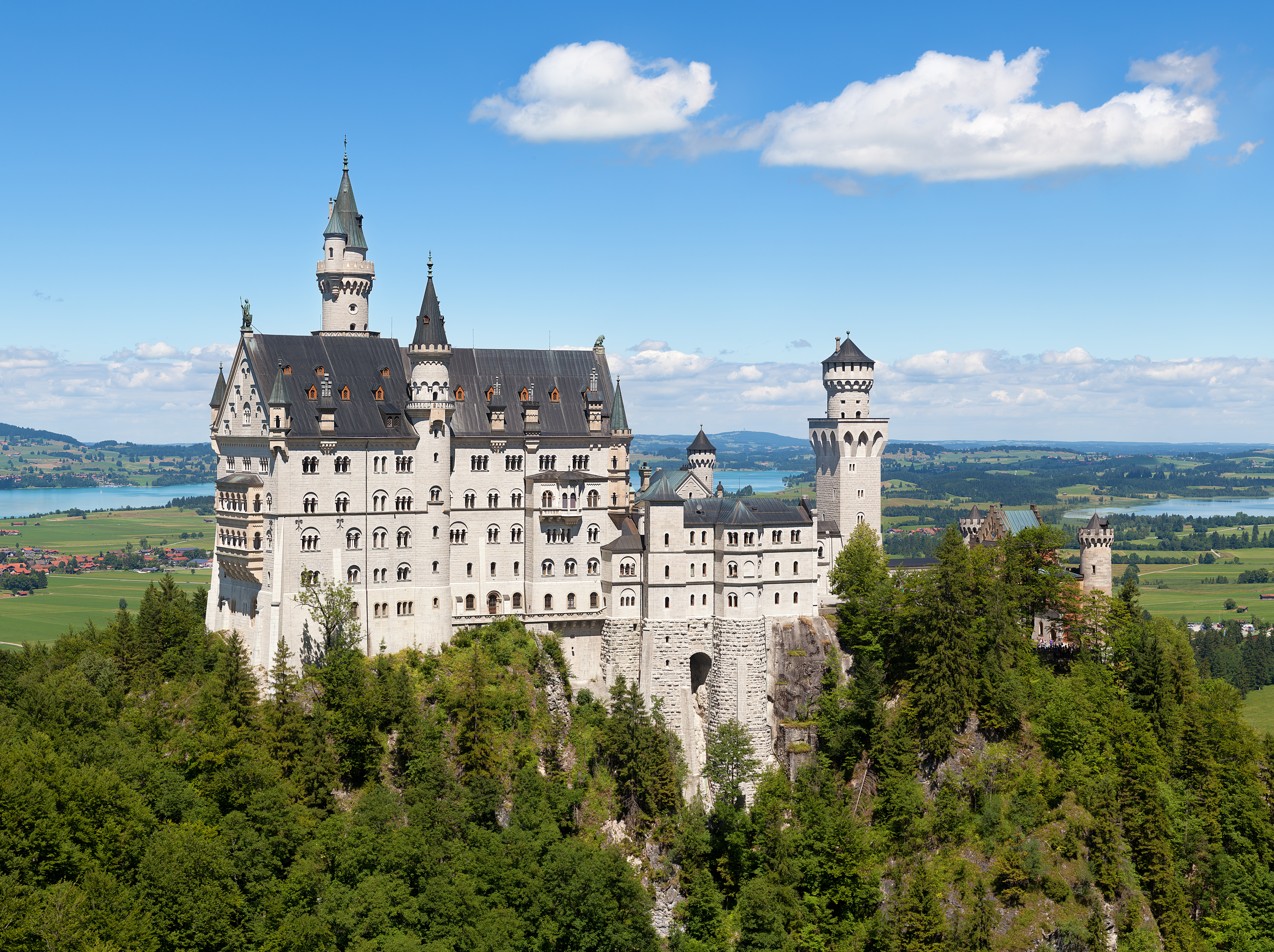
Neuschwanstein Castle

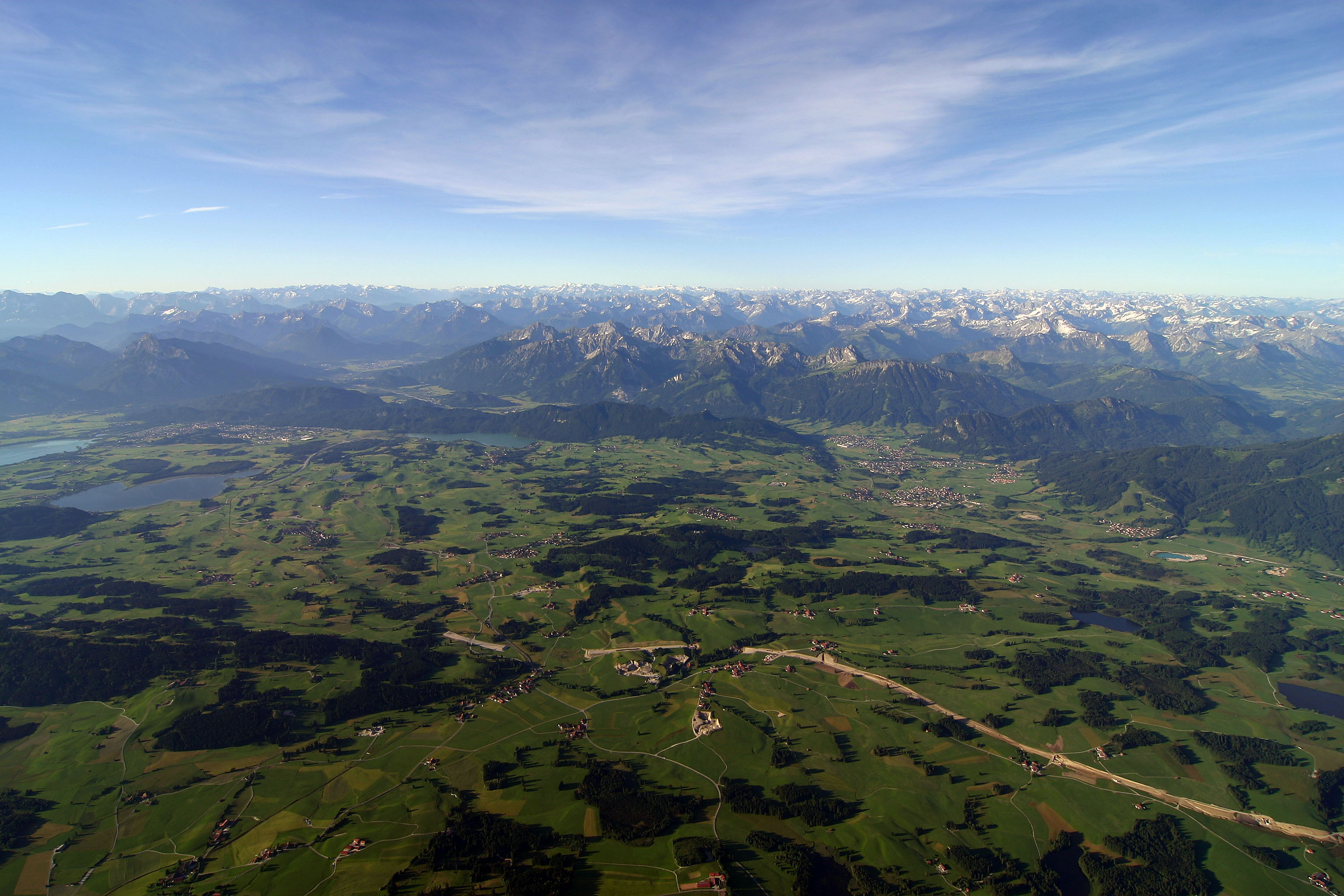
Allgäu as seen from a hot air balloon

== Transport ==
=== Air ===
The region is served by Memmingen Airport. However, the airport only provides flights to some European destinations. Other airports such as Friedrichshafen Airport, Munich Airport and Zurich Airport are also used by air travellers from the region.

== Notable people ==
- Michael Bredl (1916–1999), a singer and collector of traditional German Volksmusik
- W. G. Sebald (1944-2001), writer and academic
- Stephan Huber (born 1952), a sculptor and object artist
- Rainer W. Bussmann (born 1967), ethnobotanist and vegetation ecologist
