= Harzer =

German sour milk cheese

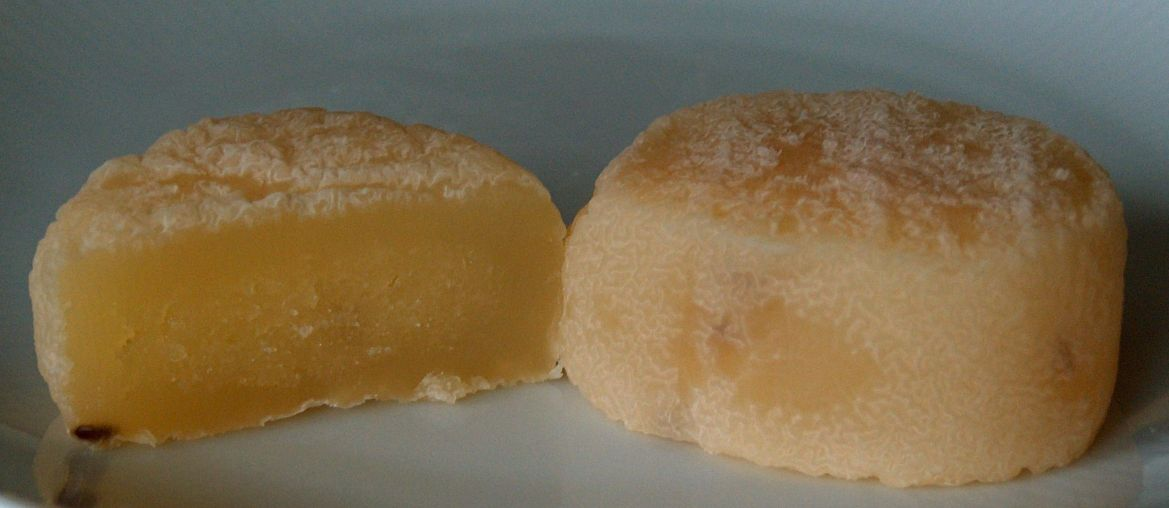
- Country of origin: Germany
- Region: Harz, Lower Saxony
- Source of milk: Cow
- Pasteurized: Yes
- Named after: Harz

Harzer cheese is a German sour milk cheese made from low fat curd cheese, which originates in the Harz mountain region south of Braunschweig.

Harzer is often small and round, in which case it is called Handkäse or Taler, or cylindrical, in which case it is called Stangenkäse. Frequently, the small and round variety is sold in a cylindrical package, which is then called Harzer Rolle.

Harzer cheese is typically flavored with caraway spice. Some varieties are white mold cheeses, others, red mold; the latter type generally has a stronger flavor. Both types develop a strong aroma after maturing for anywhere from a few days to a few weeks. Harzer has both a distinctive strong smell and flavor.

Harzer contains very little fat (less than 1%) but extremely high protein (usually around 30%), and is thus often used for special diets and sport nutrition.

== See also ==
- German cuisine
- List of German cheeses
- List of cheeses
- Olomoucké syrečky
- Hauskäse
