= Nieheimer =

Sour milk cheese

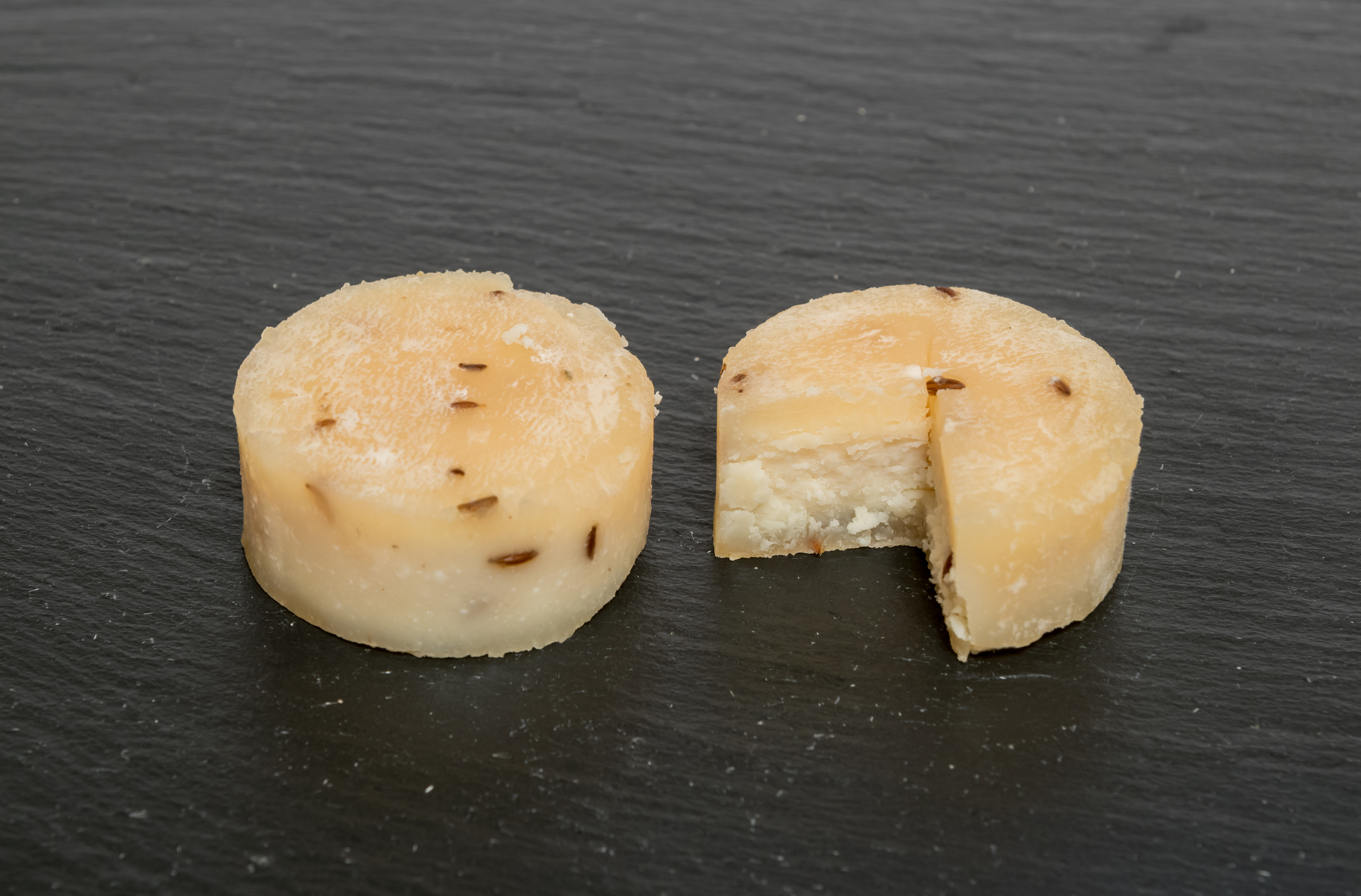
Nieheimer sauermilchkäse

Nieheimer is a sour milk cheese made using cow's milk and named after Nieheim, a town in Höxter district in North Rhine-Westphalia, Germany. It is prepared from curds that are first formed into a cake form and aged for around five to eight days. After this time, the cakes are broken down into smaller pieces, salt and caraway seeds are added, and the pieces are then covered with straw while drying. Milk or beer is also sometimes added at this time. After being flavored, the cheese is then placed into casks that are packed with layers of hops and further ripened. Nieheimer is prepared without the use of rennet.

It is a firm cheese that may even be hard at times, has a "yellowish to gray-green" colored rind, has a 28% fat content, and is sometimes purveyed covered with hop leaves. It is commonly grated or shaved when being used.

In some areas, Nieheimer is referred to informally as "hop cheese", although hop cheese itself is a different type of cheese.

== See also ==
- German cuisine
- List of cheeses
