= Hirtenkäse =

South German hard cheese

Hirtenkäse (literally "herder cheese") is a German term used to describe varieties of cheese.

== Brine cheeses ==
Hirtenkäse is used as a generic term in German-speaking countries to describe cheese in brine such as feta, sirene and beyaz peynir. These varieties originated in various countries on or near the Mediterranean and Black Seas. They share similar properties in pale colour and crumbly consistency. They may be made from milk from cows, sheep and/or goats, either alone or mixed in varying proportions.

== Allgäu hard cheese ==
Allgäuer Hirtenkäse is the name of a specific variety of hard cheese from the Allgäu region of Southern Germany.

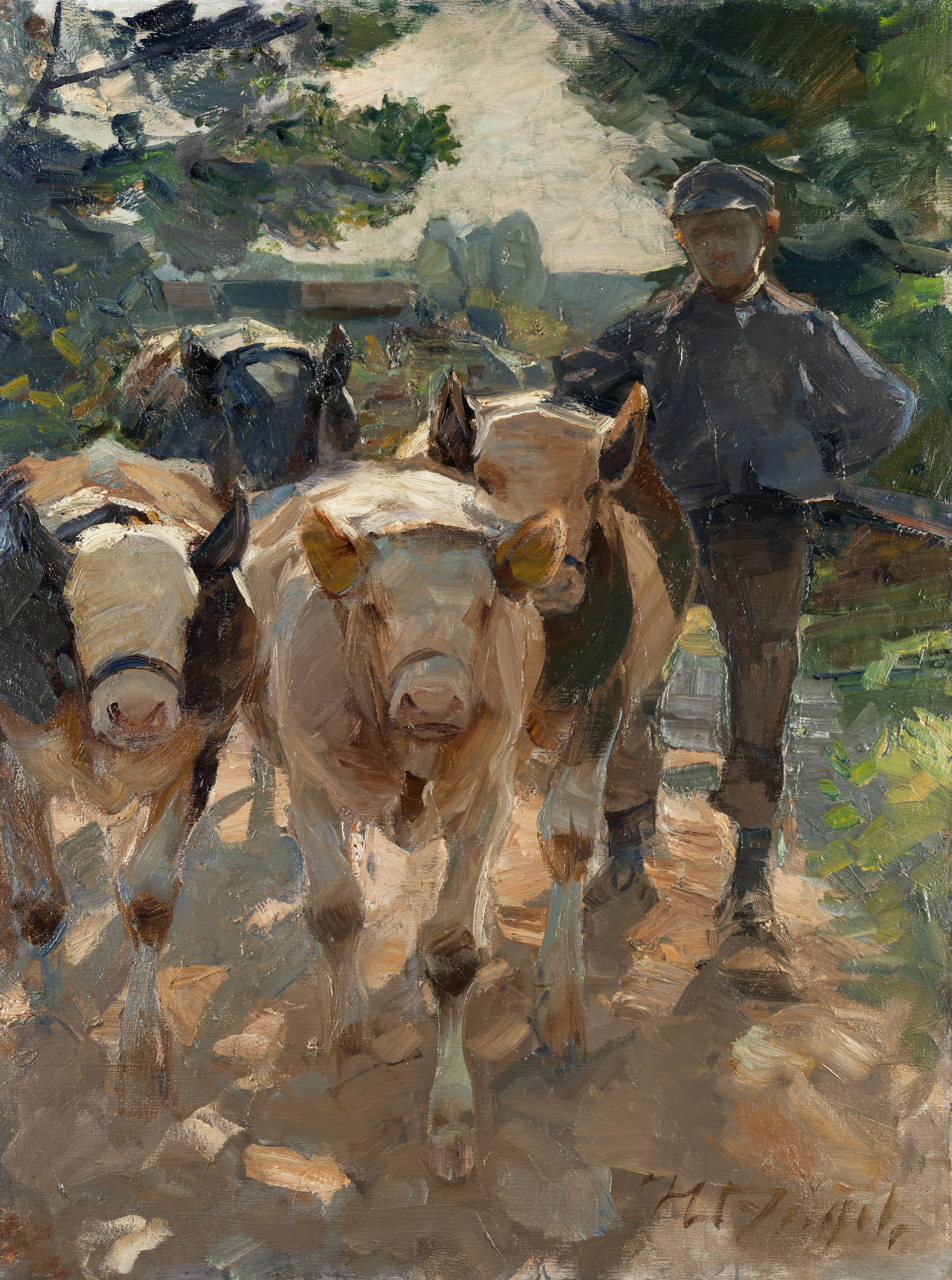
Farmer driving his cows home by Heinrich von Zügel

Traditionally, herders in the Allgäu region drive their cows downhill from their summer grazing pastures on the slopes of the Alps to farmers' stalls in the valleys, in order to spend the winter sheltered from the elements. This moving of the livestock is termed the Almabtrieb. This happens in September or October, varying by locality in the region, and is accompanied by traditional celebrations. Hirtenkäse is made from the milk from these cows. It is usually aged for eight months.

Allgäuer Hirtenkäse
- Country of origin: Germany
- Region: Allgäu
- Source of milk: Cows
- Pasteurized: No
- Texture: Hard cheese
- Aging time: varies, usually 8 months

=== Colour, texture and taste ===
This cheese is "golden" and "buttery yellow in color...." Its texture and taste are "rustic, savory and firm textured... with a rugged, earthy aroma."

A writer for the San Francisco Chronicle compared it to other hard cheeses of Europe:

In texture and flavor, the 14-pound cheese resembles a cross between Parmigiano-Reggiano and aged Gouda, with a firm golden interior and aromas of butterscotch and orange peel. ... Even at eight months, the cheese has developed some of the crunchy protein crystals found in Parmigiano-Reggiano. But additional aging makes the cheese creamier, not harder and dryer. It has a waxy texture - it even smells waxy - but it isn't crumbly like Parmigiano-Reggiano or firm enough to grate. The flavor is concentrated, with the cooked-milk sweetness of a caramel.

— Janet Fletcher, San Francisco Chronicle

=== Wine and fruit pairings ===
Hirtenkäse's nutty, earthy flavors can be complemented or contrasted.

A reviewer at the San Francisco Chronicle prefers complementing the cheese, writing, "I want a nutty, slightly sweet wine with it, such as an oloroso sherry or a Madeira."

iGourmet suggests contrasting the cheese:

Hirtenkase is wonderful with German whole grain breads, fresh and dried fruits, like apples and figs. Excellent also when coarsely grated over roasted potatoes, mixed into hot pasta with chucks of ripe tomatoes, shaved over a crisp salad. Enjoy Hirtenkase with a glass of wheat beer like a Hefeweizen, or a full bodied red wine.

— iGourmet

Like the bacon-and-chicken liver rumaki, this cheese can be combined with other foods in interesting ways to mix salty and savory flavors.

== See also ==
- German cuisine
- List of German cheeses
- List of cheeses
