= Acid-set cheese =

Cheese set by souring

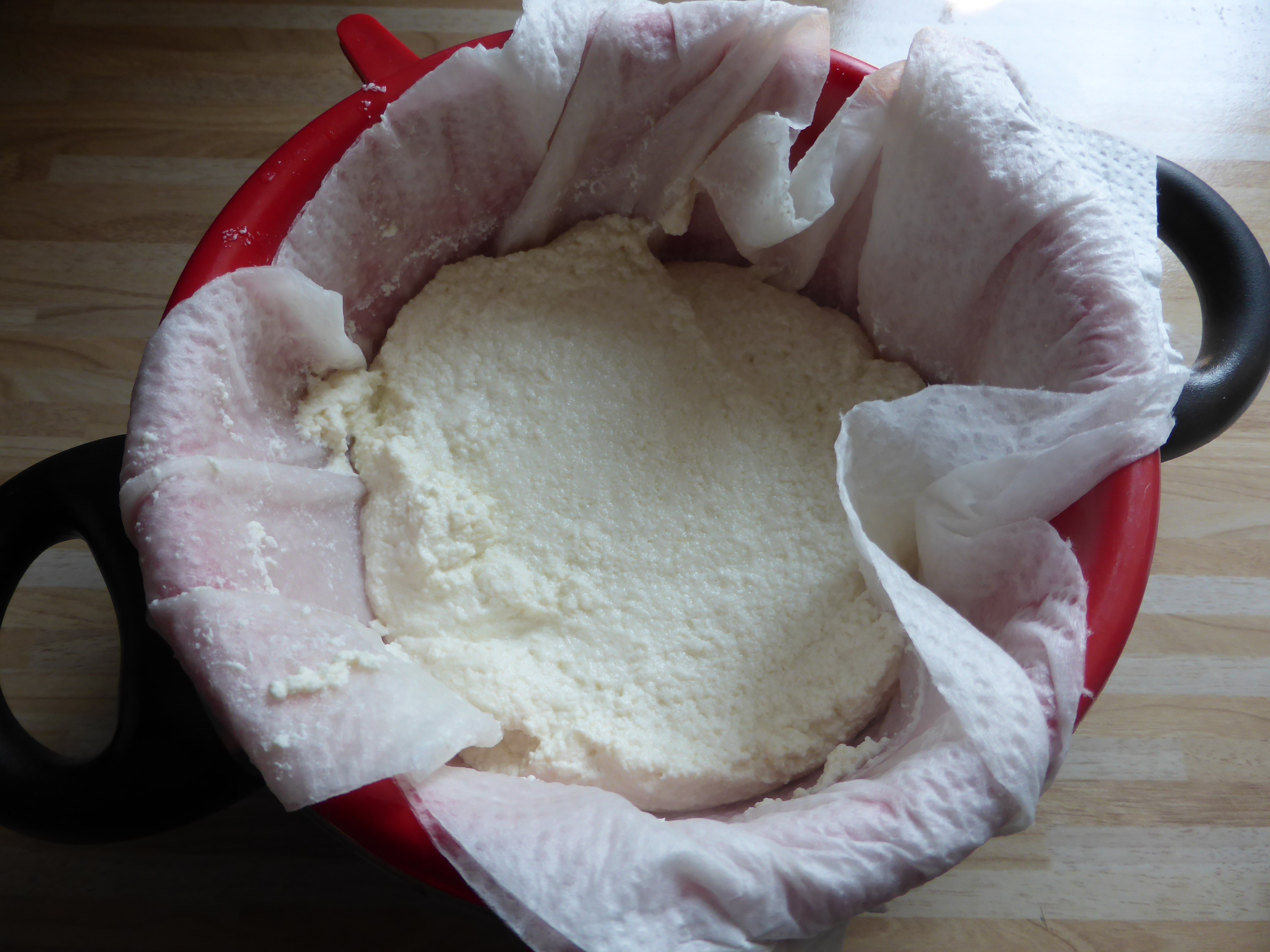
Paneer in sieve

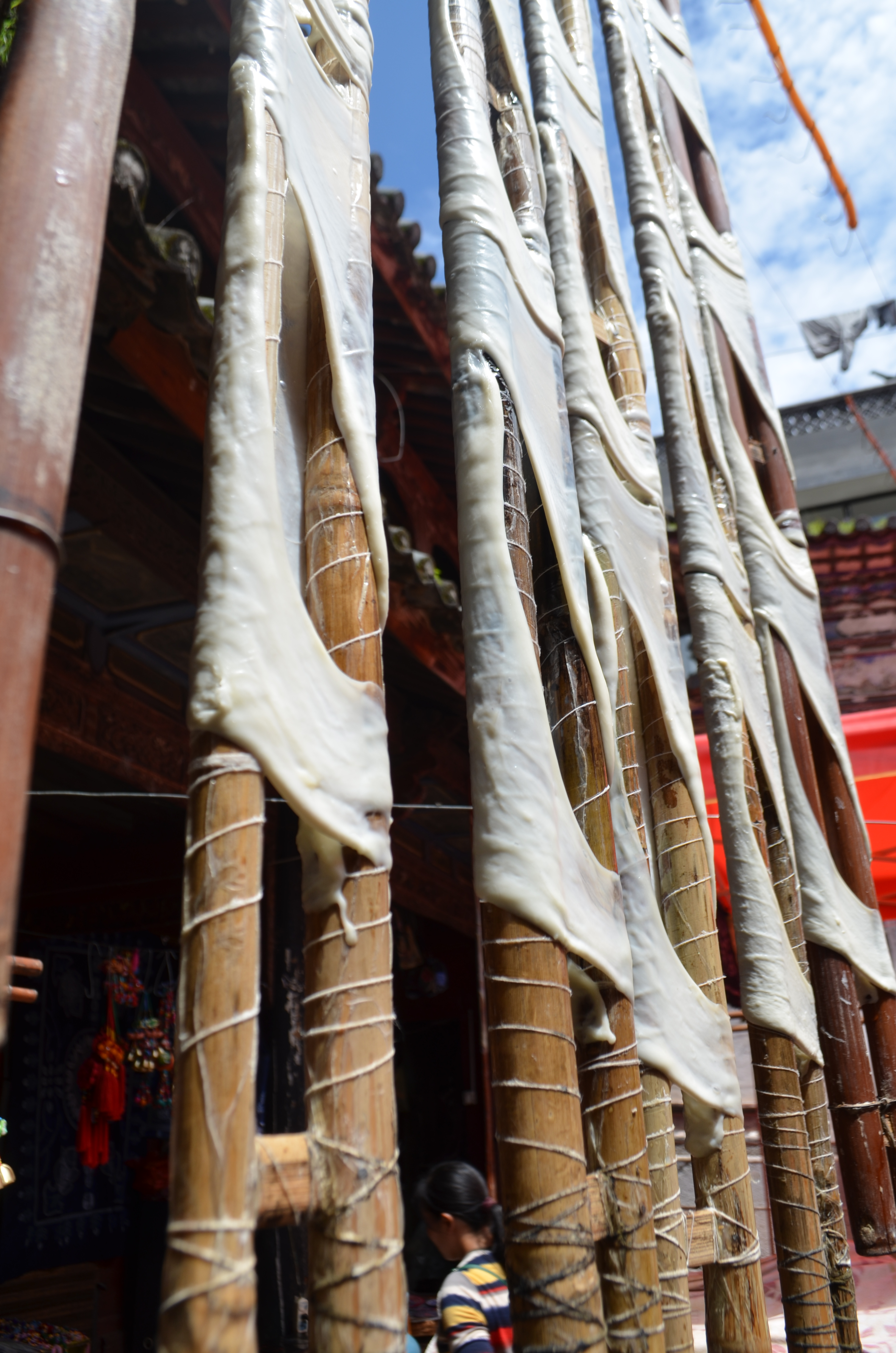
Fresh Bai cheese “Rushan cheese” is stretched and dried on bamboo.

Acid-set or sour milk cheese is cheese that has been curdled (coagulated) by natural souring, often from lactic acid bacteria, or by the addition of acid. This type of cheese is technologically simple to produce.

When making soft acid-set cheese using bacteria, the coagulum results from production of lactic acid by the starter microorganisms.

Cheeses can be classified according to a variety of features including ripening characteristics, special processing techniques (such as cheddaring) or method of coagulation. Acid-setting is a method of coagulation that accounts for around 25% of cheese production. These are generally fresh cheeses like queso blanco, quark and cream cheese. The other 75%, which include almost all ripened cheeses, are rennet cheeses.

Ricotta and most other whey cheeses are made by first heating the milk to between 90 and 92 degrees Celsius to create coprecipitation of casein and whey protein before addition of lactic or citric acid.

== Production ==
Rennet is also sometimes used in the processing of other fresh, soft cheeses like fromage frais, but it is not an essential ingredient and these cheeses can be produced by traditional methods without rennet or other enzymes.

Ricotta is a high-moisture cheese, like cottage cheese, but it is not a pressed curd cheese. It can be made from whey or a blend of milk and whey. Traditionally, ricotta was produced from the whey byproduct of mozzarella and provolone production, but modern techniques usually use whole milk (sometimes without any whey). Milk can be blended into the whey to improve curd cohesiveness, neutralize the acid in whey and increase yield. This mixture of milk and whey is heated before enough food grade acid is added to drop the pH to the needed level (this could be some type of lactic acid, citric acid, or acetic acid). Whichever type of acid is used by the cheesemaker it is important to maintain correct pH levels for the sweetness of the cheese's flavor. Some methods of mass-produced cheeses will use food grade caustic soda to neutralize the acid of the whey, before heating the blend and adding the coagulating acid.

== Regional varieties ==
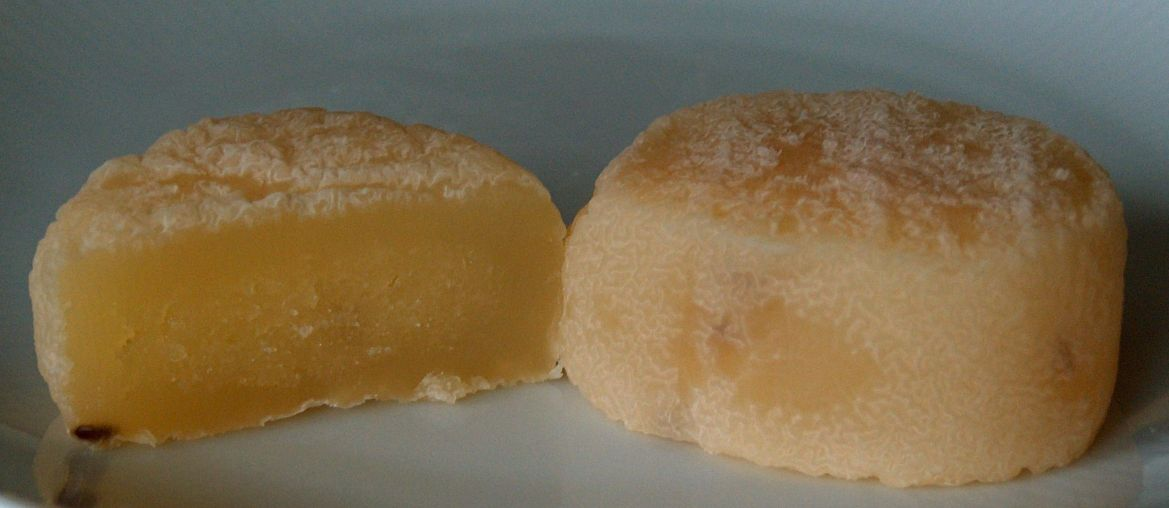
Ripened Harzer cheese

In Germany, the term Sauermilchkäse is usually applied to ripened acid-set cheeses only, but not to fresh cheeses. The various types of ripened sour milk cheese include:

- Handkäse
- Harzer
- Nieheimer
- Olomoucké syrečky (Olmützer Quargel)
- Tyrolean grey cheese

== See also ==
- Mascarpone
- Paneer
- Soured milk
- Quark (dairy product)
