= List of caves in Belgium =

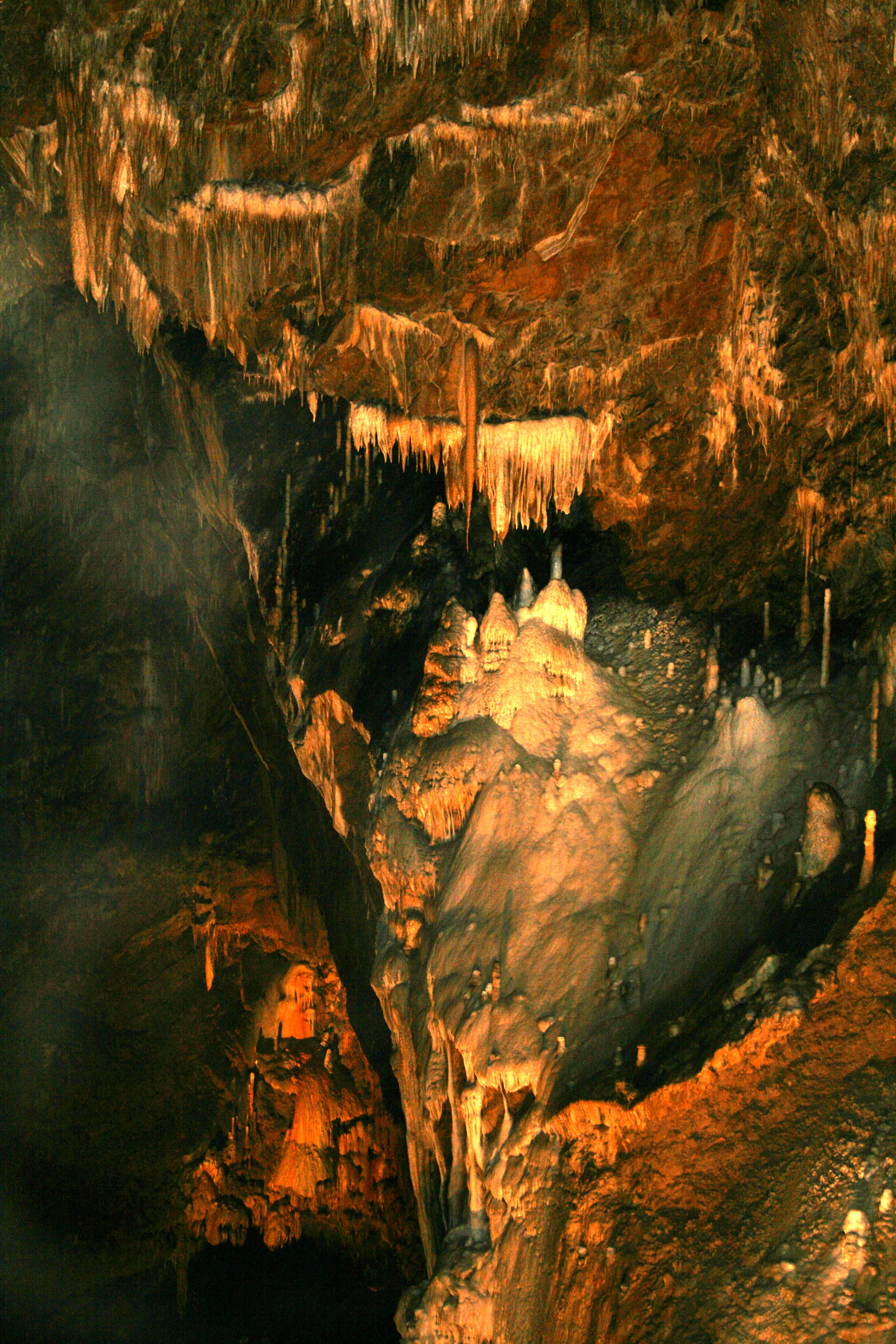
Grotte de Lorette in Rochefort, one of the Caves of Han-sur-Lesse.

This is a list of caves in Belgium, all located in Wallonia.

- Trou de l’Abîme
- Goyet Caves
- Caves of Han-sur-Lesse
- Caves of Hotton
- Grotte de Spy
- Grotte La Merveilleuse
- Naulette
- Neptune Caves
- Caves of Remouchamps
- Grotte de Rosée
- Scladina
- Grotte de ROCHEFORT
- Souffleur de BEAUREGARD
- Système CHAWRESSE-VERONIKA
- Réseau de WAERIMONT
- Trou d'HAQUIN
- Réseau de FRENES
- Grotte du Noû Bleu
- Système WERON-DELLIEUX
- Chantoir de BERON-RY
- Système FAGNOULES-BUC
- Grotte SAINTE-ANNE
- Système Fosse aux Ours
- Système WUINANT-Haminte
- Trou du NOU-MAULIN
- Galerie des SOURCES
- Grotte du PERE NOEL
- Grotte des EMOTIONS
- Abri du Risous
- Système de BRETAYE
- Trou des Manants
- Grotte de l'ADUGEOIR
- Grottes de GOYET
- Trou des CREVES
- Abime du FOURNEAU
- Grotte du FAYT
- Grotte BEBRONNE - CLISORE
- Grande grotte de Malacord
- Grotte de RAMIOUL
- Chantoir de Rostène
- Grotte MICHAUX
- Grotte de la FONTAINE DE RIVIRE
- Trou de la Chaise
- Trou de l'EGLISE
- Grotte de la VILAINE SOURCE
- Grande Faille du Fond des Cris
- Trou BERNARD
- Système ENFER-FISSURES
- Grotte du Chalet
- Chantoir de Valentin
- Grotte du PRE-AU-TONNEAU
- TROU-QUI-FUME
- Grotte NYS
- Grotte d'EPRAVE
- Grotte de Pont d'Arcole
- Grotte de l'Isbelle
- Nouvelle Grotte de ON
- Abime de COMBLAIN-AU-PONT
- Chantoir de la LAIDE FOSSE
- Abime de Lesves/Hyacinthes
- TROU DES NUTONS
- Grotte-Mine & Grotte de l'Etang de la Villa des Hirondelles
- Chantoir de ROUGE THIERS
- Trou des Côtes
- Grottes de Floreffe
- Trou du PARRAIN
- Grotte des SURDENTS
- Chantoir d'ADSEUX
- Trou MANTO/ST-ETIENNE
- Chantoir du Moulin
- Chantoir de KIN
- Trou du Bonheur
- Grotte ALEXANDRE
- Chantoir de SECHEVAL
- Système BOHON-RENARD
- Grotte de HIERGES-VAUCELLES
- Grotte HEINRICHS
- Grotte STEINLEIN
- Grotte du CHAFOUR
- Grotte de la MYSTERIEUSE
- Trou OZER

== See also ==
- List of caves
- Speleology
