= Dailly, Belgium =

Dailly Dayi (Walloon)
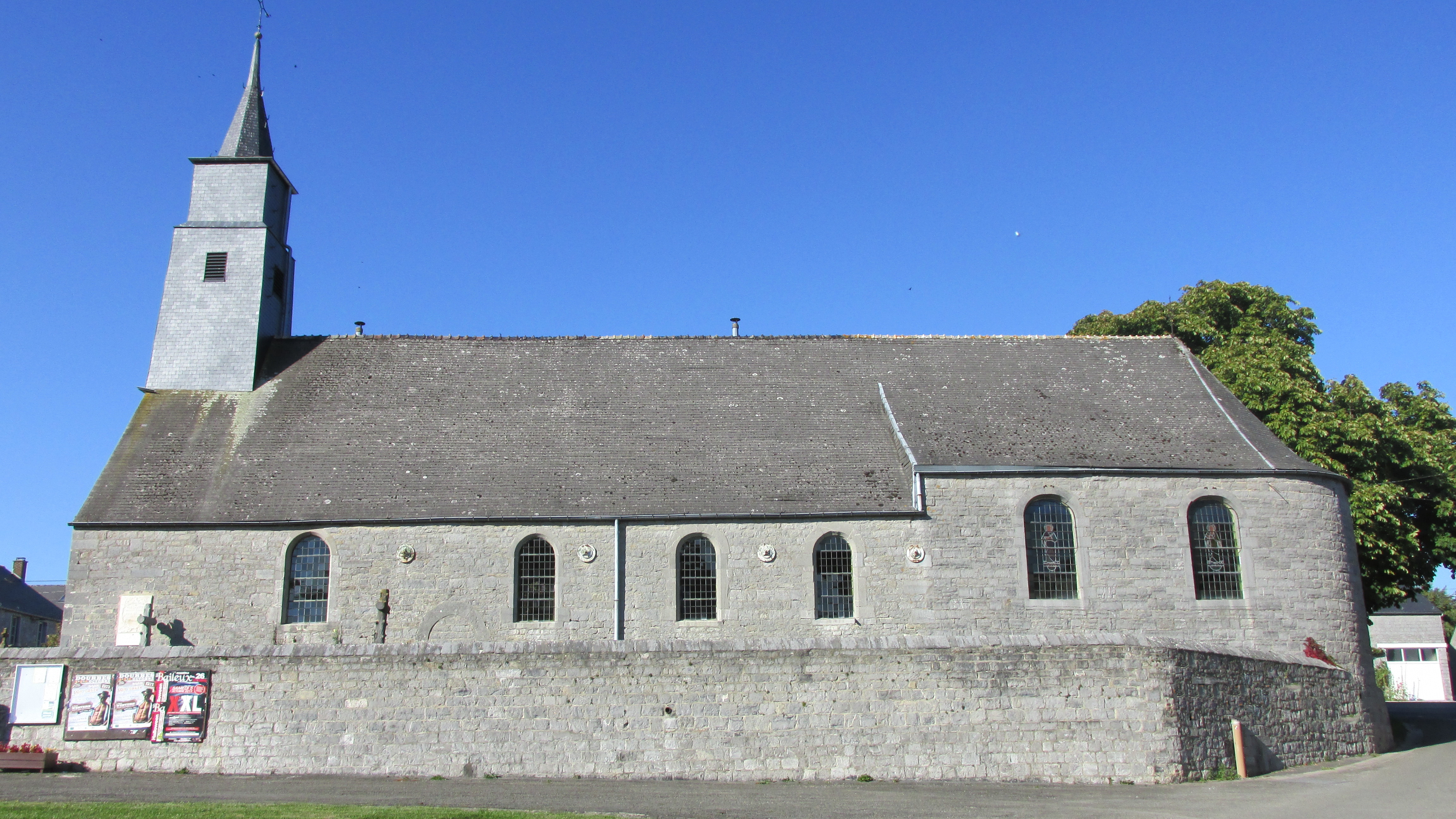
- Dailly, village church

- Location within Belgium Location within Europe
- Coordinates: 50°03′28″N 04°26′06″E
- Country: Belgium
- Region: Wallonia
- Province: Namur
- Municipality: Couvin

Dailly (Walloon: Dayi) is a village of Wallonia and a district of the municipality of Couvin, located in the province of Namur, Belgium.

Archaeological evidence show that a secondary Roman road passed through the area during antiquity. In 1021, the village was owned by Lobbes Abbey. Later, it was divided between Waulsort Abbey and Floreffe Abbey, and the lords of Chimay. A castle existed here during the Middle Ages, but it was destroyed by French troops in 1545. The current village church was erected on its ruins, and enlarged in the early 17th century.
