= List of protected heritage sites in Floreffe =

This table shows an overview of the protected heritage sites in the Walloon town Floreffe. This list is part of Belgium's national heritage.

Object	Year/architect	Town/section	Address	Coordinates	Number^{?}	Image
Old mill of the Romanesque abbey of Floreffe ^{(nl)} ^{(fr)}		Floreffe		50.432397°N 4.758879°E	92045-CLT-0001-01 Info	
The buildings of the abbey of Floreffe, the farm, the building near the pond, retaining walls, the parish church of Our Lady of the Rosary and the chapel of Saint-Roch and the ensemble formed by these buildings and their surrounding areas, farm Rober Sart ^{(nl)} ^{(fr)}		Floreffe		50.433056°N 4.759048°E	92045-CLT-0002-01 Info	De gebouwen van de abdij van Floreffe, de boerderij, het gebouw bij het vijver, keerwanden, de parochiekerk van Onze Lieve Vrouw van de Rozenkrans en de kapel Saint-Roch en het ensemble gevormd door deze gebouwen en hun omliggende terreinen, met boerderij Robersart More images
Chapel Saint-Pierre and the ensemble through the chapel and its surroundings ^{(nl)} ^{(fr)}		Floreffe		50.433534°N 4.736283°E	92045-CLT-0005-01 Info	
The facades and roofs of the castle ^{(nl)} ^{(fr)}		Floreffe	Soye	50.447743°N 4.730300°E	92045-CLT-0006-01 Info	
Chapel of Saint-Amand ^{(nl)} ^{(fr)}		Floreffe	Soye	50.449231°N 4.730779°E	92045-CLT-0008-01 Info	Kapel Saint-Amand
Chapel of Saint-Martin ^{(nl)} ^{(fr)}		Floreffe	Jodion	50.455975°N 4.730785°E	92045-CLT-0011-01 Info	
Chapel of Saint-Roch ^{(nl)} ^{(fr)}		Floreffe	Soye	50.452563°N 4.732608°E	92045-CLT-0012-01 Info	
Interior and exterior of the corner tower of the farm de la Tour, and the ensemble formed by the former meander of the Sambre river, the farm de la Tour with its outbuildings and surrounding areas ^{(nl)} ^{(fr)}		Floreffe	rue Oscar Gubin n° 20, te Floriffoux	50.450047°N 4.762006°E	92045-CLT-0013-01 Info	
Old mill of the Romanesque abbey of Floreffe ^{(nl)} ^{(fr)}		Floreffe		50.432397°N 4.758879°E	92045-PEX-0001-01 Info	
Ensemble of the Abbey of Floreffe except the organ, choir of abbey church, and the ensemble of the abbey buildings and surrounding areas of the site ^{(nl)} ^{(fr)}		Floreffe		50.433056°N 4.759048°E	92045-PEX-0002-01 Info	Ensemble van de abdij van Floreffe met uitzondering van de orgels, koor van abdijkerk, en het ensemble van de abdijgebouwen en omliggende terreinen van de site More images

== See also ==
- List of protected heritage sites in Namur (province)
