= Limburger =

West European cheese

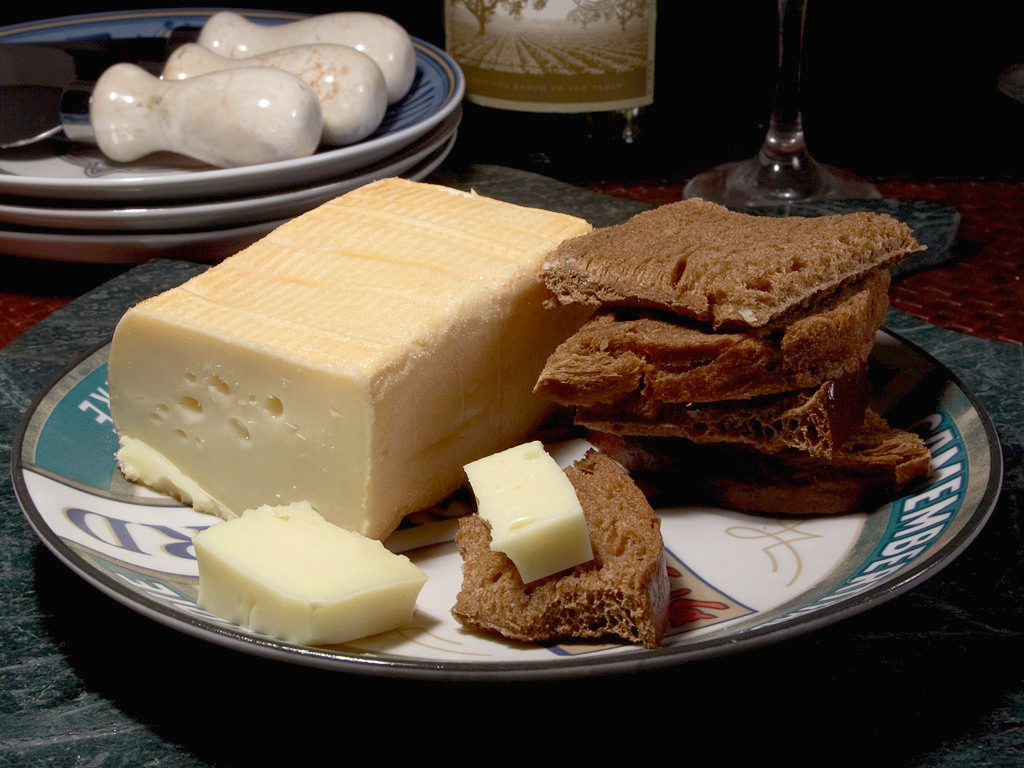
- Country of origin: The Low Countries and Germany
- Source of milk: Cow
- Texture: Semi-soft
- Aging time: 2–3 months

Herve
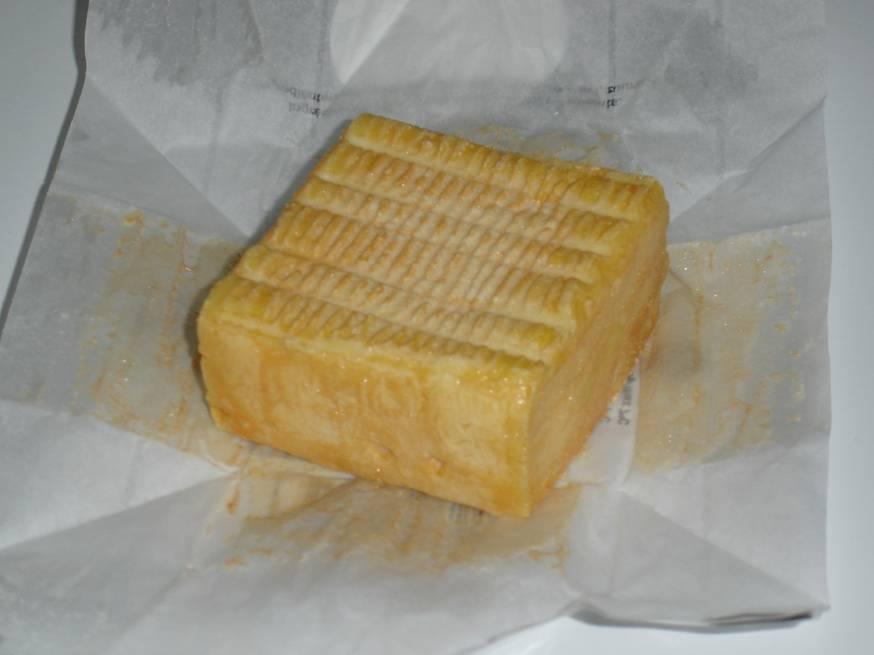
- Other names: Fromage de Herve
- Country of origin: Belgium
- Region: Pays de Herve
- Town: Herve
- Source of milk: Cow
- Texture: Soft
- Fat content: 45%
- Weight: 50, 100, 200, or 400 g
- Aging time: 3 weeks to 2 months
- Certification: PDO

Limburger, commonly known as Limburg (in southern Dutch contexts Rommedoe, and in Belgium Herve cheese), is a cheese that originated in the Herve area of the historical Duchy of Limburg, which had its capital in Limbourg-sur-Vesdre, now in the French-speaking Belgian province of Liège. The cheese is especially known for its strong smell caused by the bacterium Brevibacterium linens.

Herve has been produced since the 15th century.

== History and geographic origins ==
The Herve name has become the modern European protected name for the cheese, while the Limburger name is used for the same style when made in other regions. Herve cheese, or "Fromage de Herve", is still produced in the territory of the old Duchy of Limburg, in Belgium, where it has been produced since the 15th century. Herve is located near Liège, and the borders separating Belgium from the Netherlands and Germany. The "Land of Herve" is a hilly area between the Vesdre and Meuse rivers. The duchy existed until the French Revolution as a part of the Holy Roman Empire, and the cheese style became popular in other areas, known by the name of its country of origin.

In the USA, it was first produced by the F.X. Baumert cheese factory in Antwerp, New York, in 1854. It was also produced in 1867 by Rudolph Benkerts in his cellar from pasteurized goat's milk. A few years later, 25 factories produced this cheese. It was also manufactured in Canada, where it was a German-Canadian cultural marker, by the Oak Grove Cheese Company in New Hamburg, Ontario. Today, the only limburger producer in the United States is Chalet Cheese Cooperative in Monroe, Wisconsin.

== Production ==
Herve is a Belgian rind washed soft cheese made from raw cow's milk. The aging process takes place in ripening cellars of the Herve countryside, sometimes cut into its chalky rock.

It is sometimes flavored with herbs. Herve has a pale yellow interior with a glossy reddish-brown coating created by the bacteria that grow during its 3-month aging. It is usually shaped into a brick when sold. The taste and flavor of the cheese deepens during the period of ripening. When young, the interior is sweet, and with age it becomes spicy.

== Description ==
In its first month, the cheese is firmer and more crumbly, similar to the texture of feta cheese. After about six weeks, the cheese becomes softer along the edges but is still firm on the inside and can be described as salty and chalky. After two months it is mostly creamy and much smoother. Once it reaches three months, the cheese produces its notorious smell because of the bacterium used to ferment Limburger cheese and many other smear-ripened cheeses. This is Brevibacterium linens, the same one found on human skin that is partially responsible for body odor (particularly foot odor).

== Uses ==
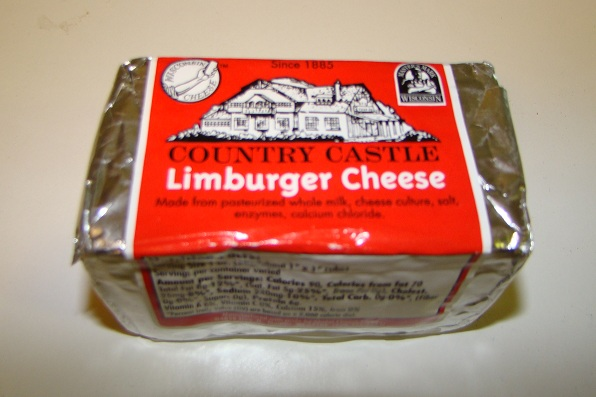
A half-pound (226-gram) package of Limburger

It was often regarded as one of the most popular cheeses in Belgium.

One way to serve Limburger is the Limburger sandwich. After three months, when the cheese has ripened, it becomes spreadable. The cheese is often spread thick (more than 0.5 cm or 0.2 inch) on firm-textured 100% rye bread, with a large, thick slice of onion, and is typically served with strong black coffee or lager beer. Alternatively, chunks or slices of the cheese up to 1.5 cm (0.6 inch) thick can be cut off the block and placed in the sandwich.

This sandwich remains very popular among the descendants of Swiss and German immigrants in the Midwestern United States, in places including Wisconsin and Ohio.

In Wisconsin, the Limburger sandwich can be found on menus at certain restaurants, accompanied by brown mustard. There are several variations, such as the addition of bologna, lettuce, tomato, roasted walnuts, and the use of white or French bread. Sometimes the rind of the cheese is rinsed or removed to weaken its odor.

== In popular culture ==
Limburger and its characteristic odor are a frequent butt of jokes. Reactions to, and misinterpretations of, the smell of Limburger cheese were gags used in numerous Looney Tunes, Little Rascals, and Three Stooges comedy shorts as well as in the Abbott and Costello films Who Done It? (1942) and Abbott and Costello Go to Mars (1953). The arch-enemy of the Biker Mice from Mars has the name Lawrence Limburger, complete with terrible body odor.

The smell of the cheese is referenced in the B-52's 1979 single "Dance This Mess Around", with the lyric "why don't you dance with me? I'm not no Limburger" suggesting that the singer feels she does not have bad enough body odor to warrant not getting a dance partner.

In the Disney Channel Original Movie Don't Look Under the Bed, Larry is making "Boogey Goo" which is said to smell terrible. He lists Limburger cheese as one of the ingredients.

A study showing that the malaria mosquito (Anopheles gambiae) is attracted equally to the smell of Limburger and to the smell of human feet earned the Ig Nobel Prize in 2006 in the area of biology. The results of the study were published in the medical journal The Lancet on 9 November 1996. As a direct result of these findings, traps baited with this cheese have been placed in strategic locations in some parts of Africa to combat the epidemic of malaria.

Limburger is one of the cheeses mentioned in the Cheese Shop sketch, that appears in the "Salad Days" episode of Monty Python's Flying Circus, where Mr Wensleydale (Michael Palin) the proprietor of the cheese shop suggests Limburger to John Cleese's character.

== Nutrition facts ==
100 g of Limburger contains:

- 17 g of saturated fat and 27 g of total fat
- 327 calories, of which 240 calories are from fat
- 90 mg of cholesterol
- 800 mg of sodium
- 20 g of protein

== See also ==
- Liederkranz cheese
- List of German cheeses
- List of cheeses
