= Wolfsschlucht =

Wolfsschlucht (Wolf's Gorge) was the codename for two of Adolf Hitler's military headquarters during the Second World War:

- Wolfsschlucht I, located in Brûly-de-Pesche, Belgium
- Wolfsschlucht II, located in Margival, France
