= Mariembourg =

Town in Wallonia, Belgium

Mariembourg Mariyambour (Walloon)
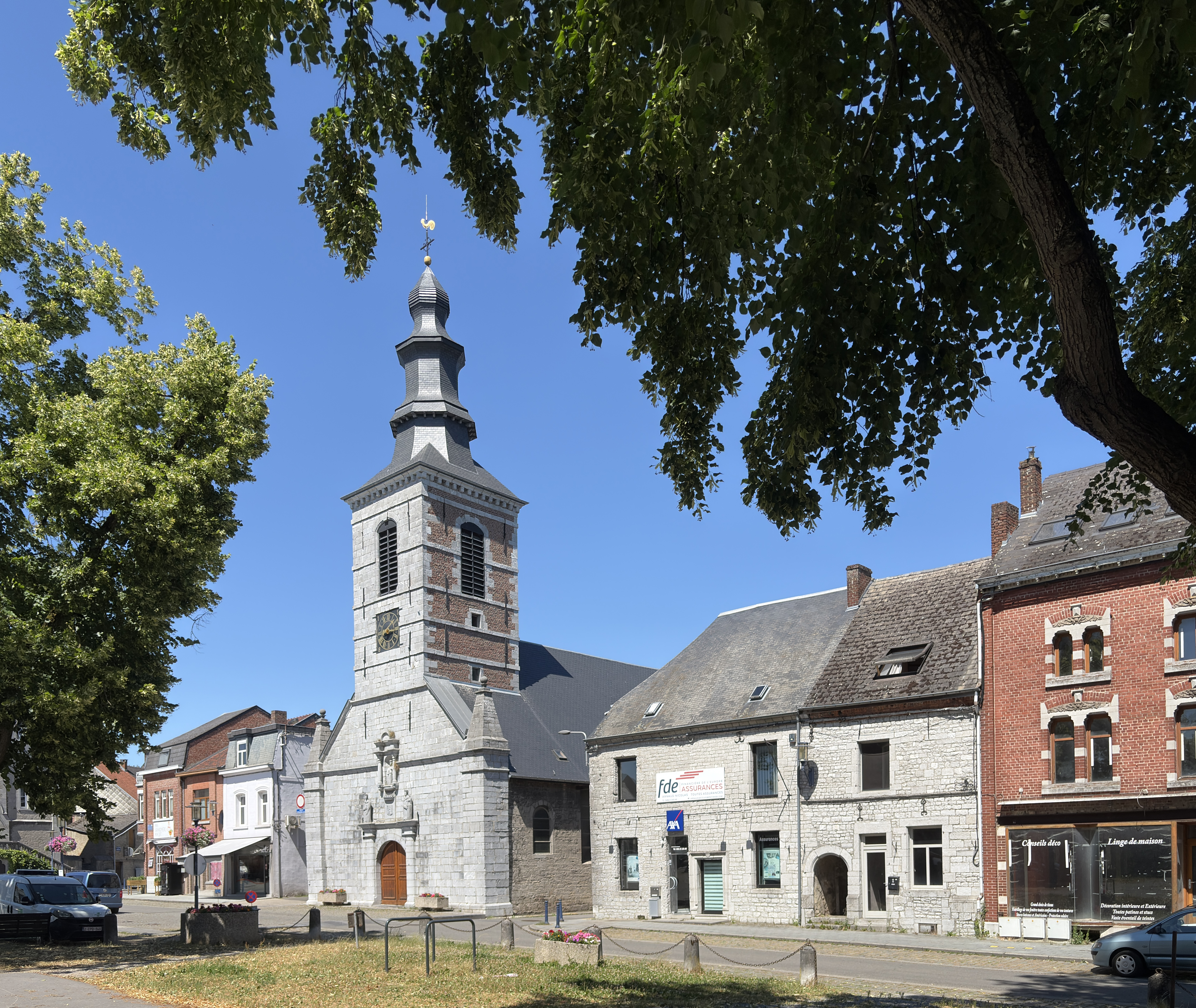
- Mariembourg, Place Marie de Hongrie

- Location within Belgium Location within Europe
- Coordinates: 50°05′38″N 04°31′15″E
- Country: Belgium
- Region: Wallonia
- Province: Namur
- Municipality: Couvin

Mariembourg (French pronunciation: [maʁjɑ̃buʁ]; Walloon: Mariyambour) is a town in the municipality of Couvin in the Province of Namur, Wallonia, Belgium.

The town is named after Mary of Hungary, governor of what was then the Habsburg Netherlands, who ordered the construction of a fortress town there in 1542. The fortifications were demolished in 1853, but the former arsenal remains. By 1554, it was conquered by French troops, and has throughout the centuries frequently switched hands. The town has a church (built in 1542), a Neo-Gothic former town hall and is served by a railway station.

== History ==
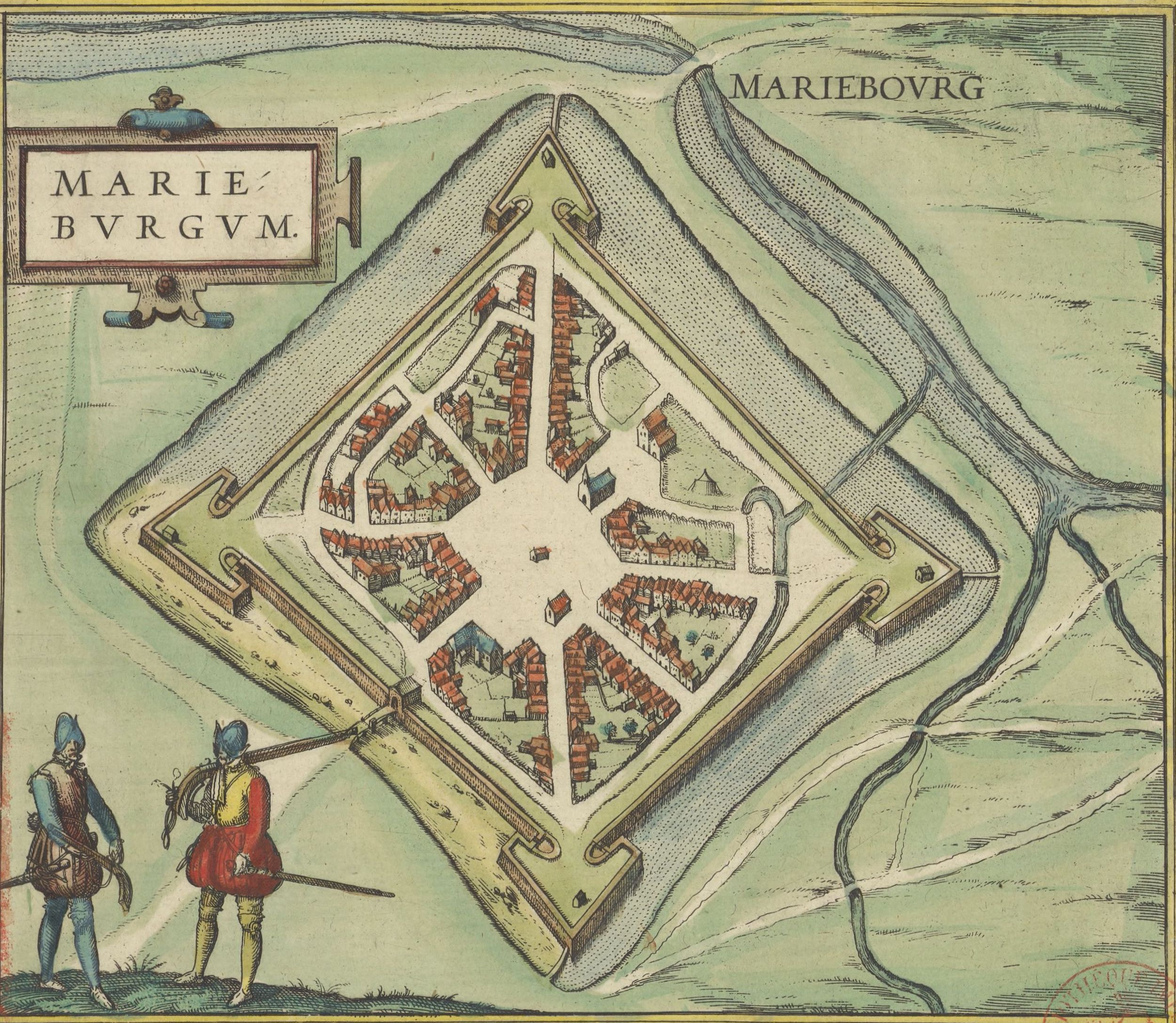
Plan of Mariembourg in 1645

The area around the Sambre and Meuse rivers has frequently been the scene of conflicts and battles. During the early 16th century, the development of stronger artillery necessitated a new kind of fortifications. Mary of Hungary, governor of what was then the Habsburg Netherlands, was tasked with strengthening the fortifications along the border with France by her brother, Emperor Charles V; the French had laid out a series of fortifications on their side of the border already in 1519. At Mary's initiative, the fortress of Mariembourg was created in 1542–1546 on land which had earlier belonged to the Floreffe Abbey. It was named Mariembourg in honour of Mary of Hungary, and its main square is today also named after her.

The fortress town, which at its completion was considered impenetrable, was besieged by French troops in 1554 and taken only three days later. During the brief period of French rule between 1554 and 1559, it was renamed "Henribourg" in honour of Henry II of France. In the following centuries it was conquered and retaken several times. It became part of Belgium after the Belgian Revolution in 1830. The historic fortifications were demolished in 1853 in line with the country's enforced neutrality and were replaced by a ring of boulevards.

== Description ==
The fortress town was designed according to a symmetrical plan, with a central square to which eight streets led. It lies in a valley bordered by the rivers Brouffe and Eau Blanche. The central square, formally called Place Marie de Hongrie but also referred simply to as Grand Place, is the location of the church, built in 1542 in a Renaissance style, and the former town hall from 1884, built in a Gothic revival style. In the middle of the square is a monumental fountain from 1863. Behind the former town hall is the former arsenal, built during the time of the United Kingdom of the Netherlands, in 1815. Behind the church there is a monument dedicated to Léopold Roger, a citizen of Mariembourg who (with Edmond Thieffry) piloted the first flight between Belgium and the Belgian Congo in 1925.

The town is served by the heritage railway Chemin de fer à vapeur des Trois Vallées, as well as by regular train services.

=== Streets of Mariembourg ===
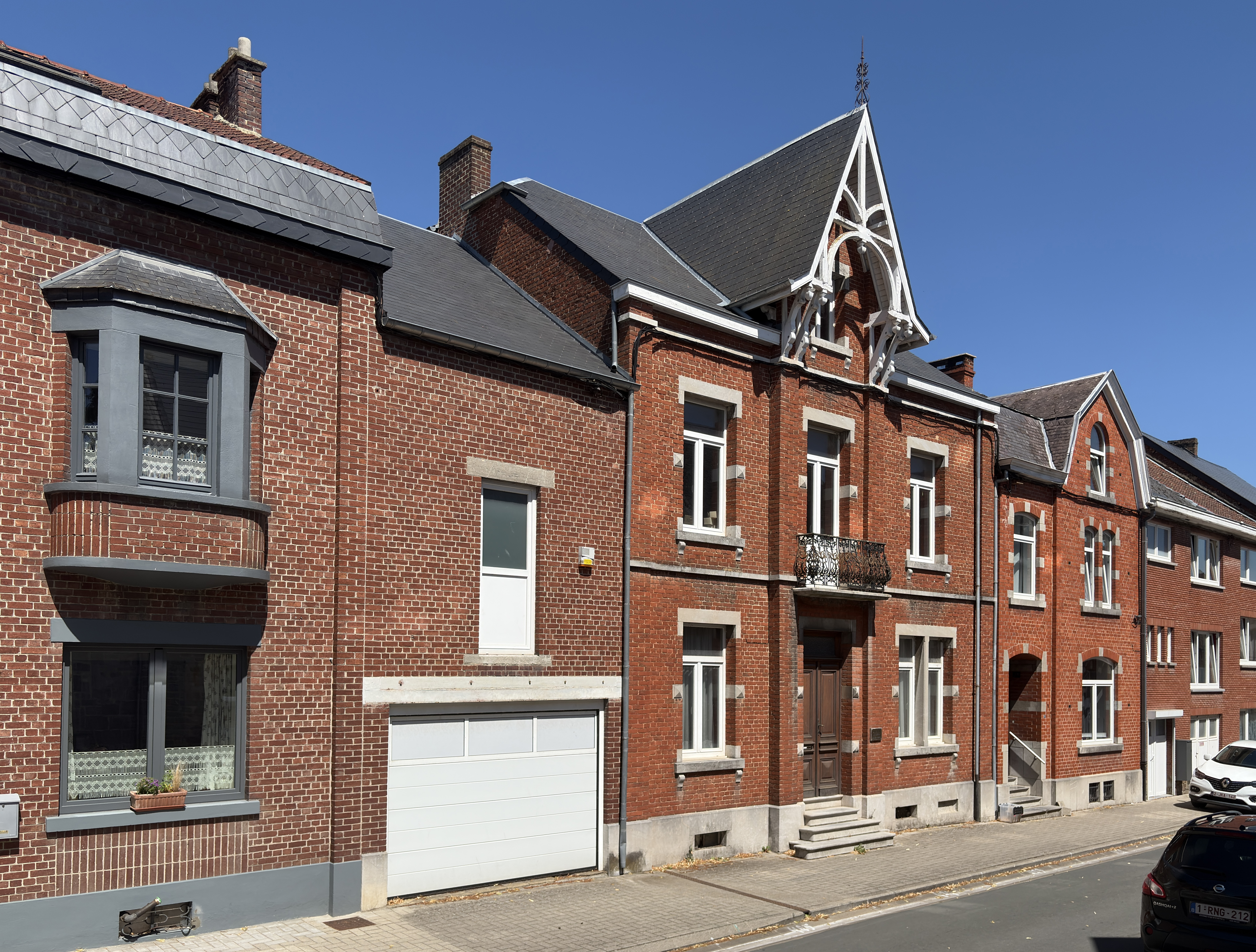
Rue Dauphine

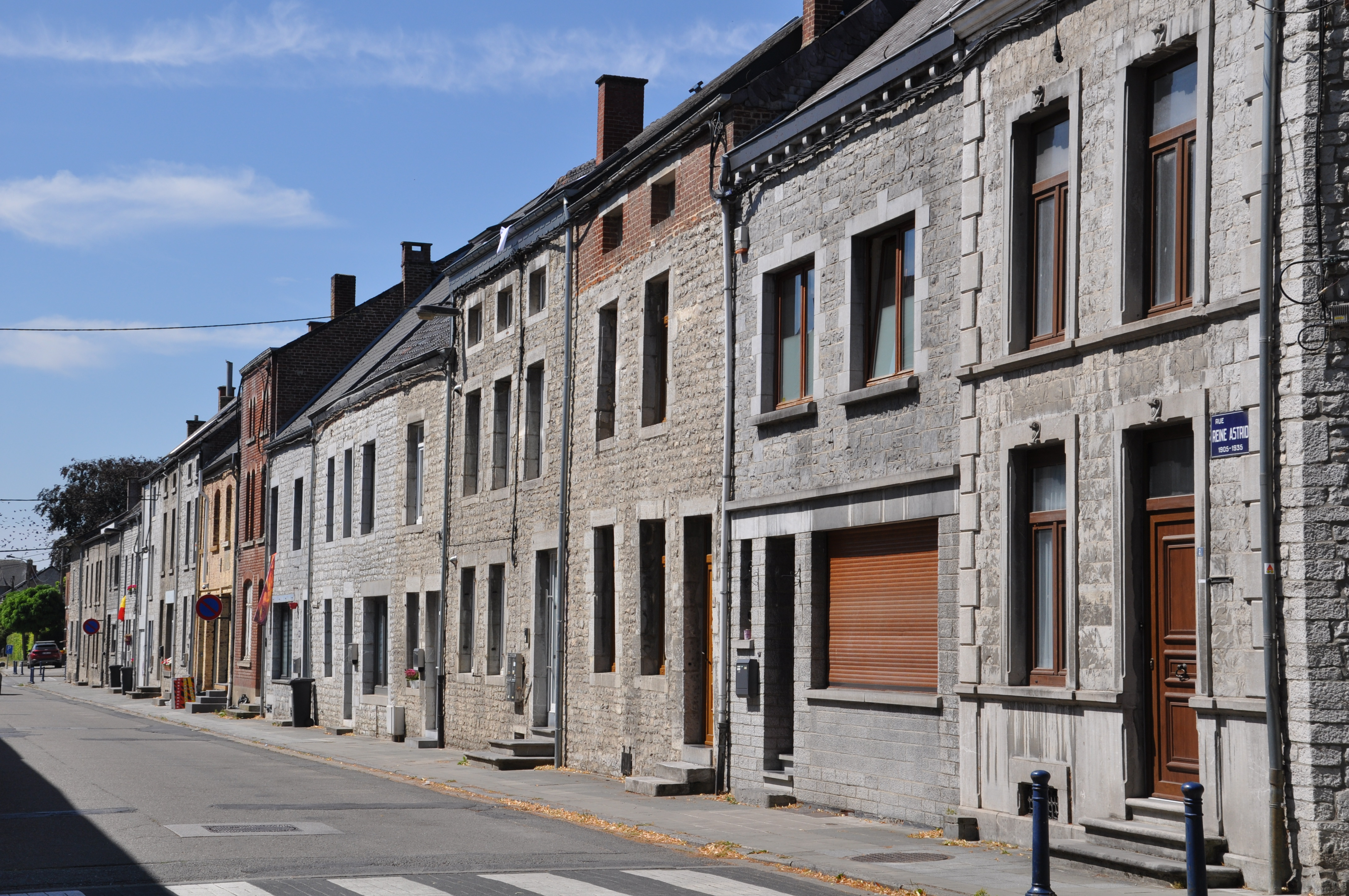
Rue Reine Astrid

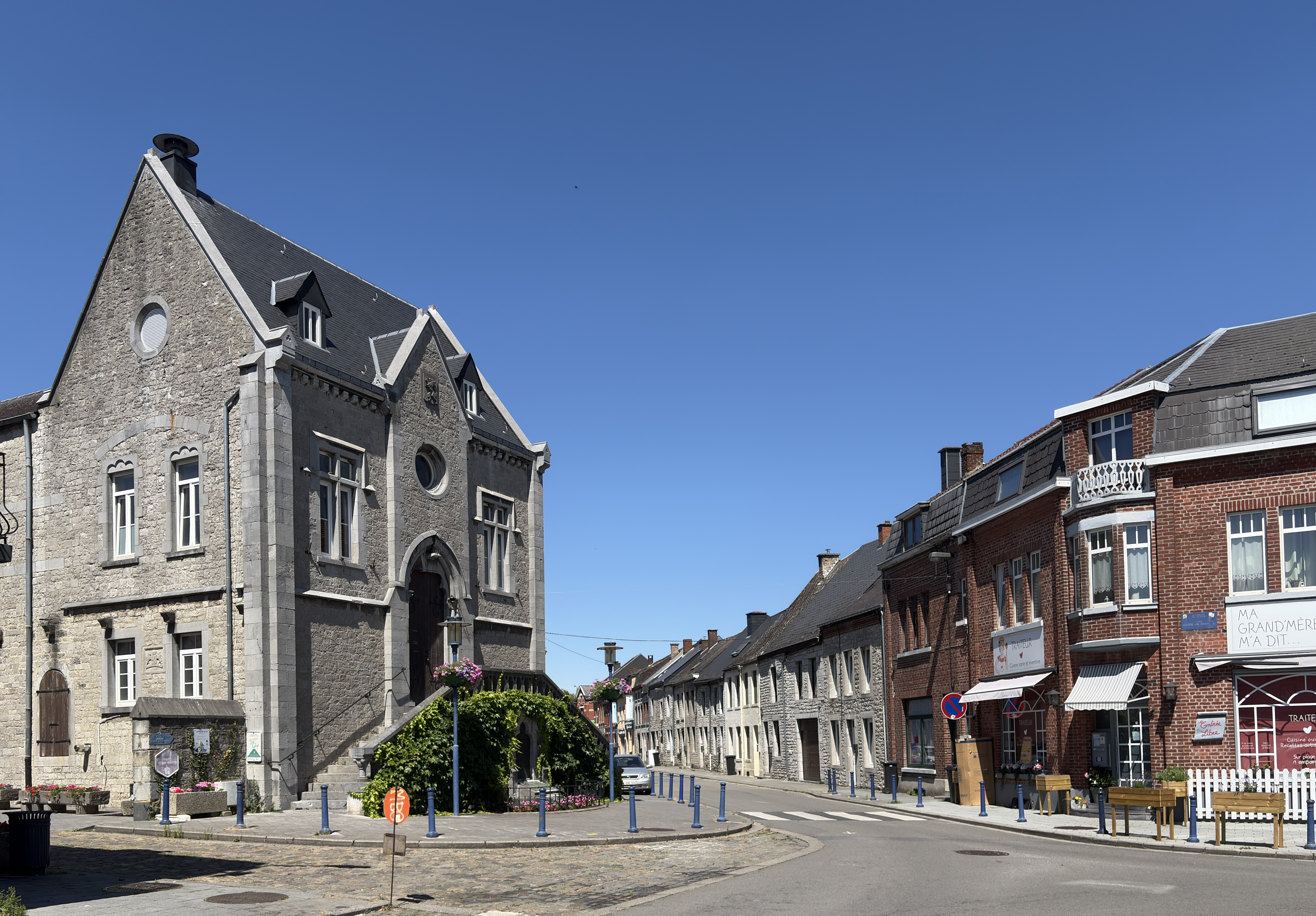
Rue Saint-Louis and former town hall

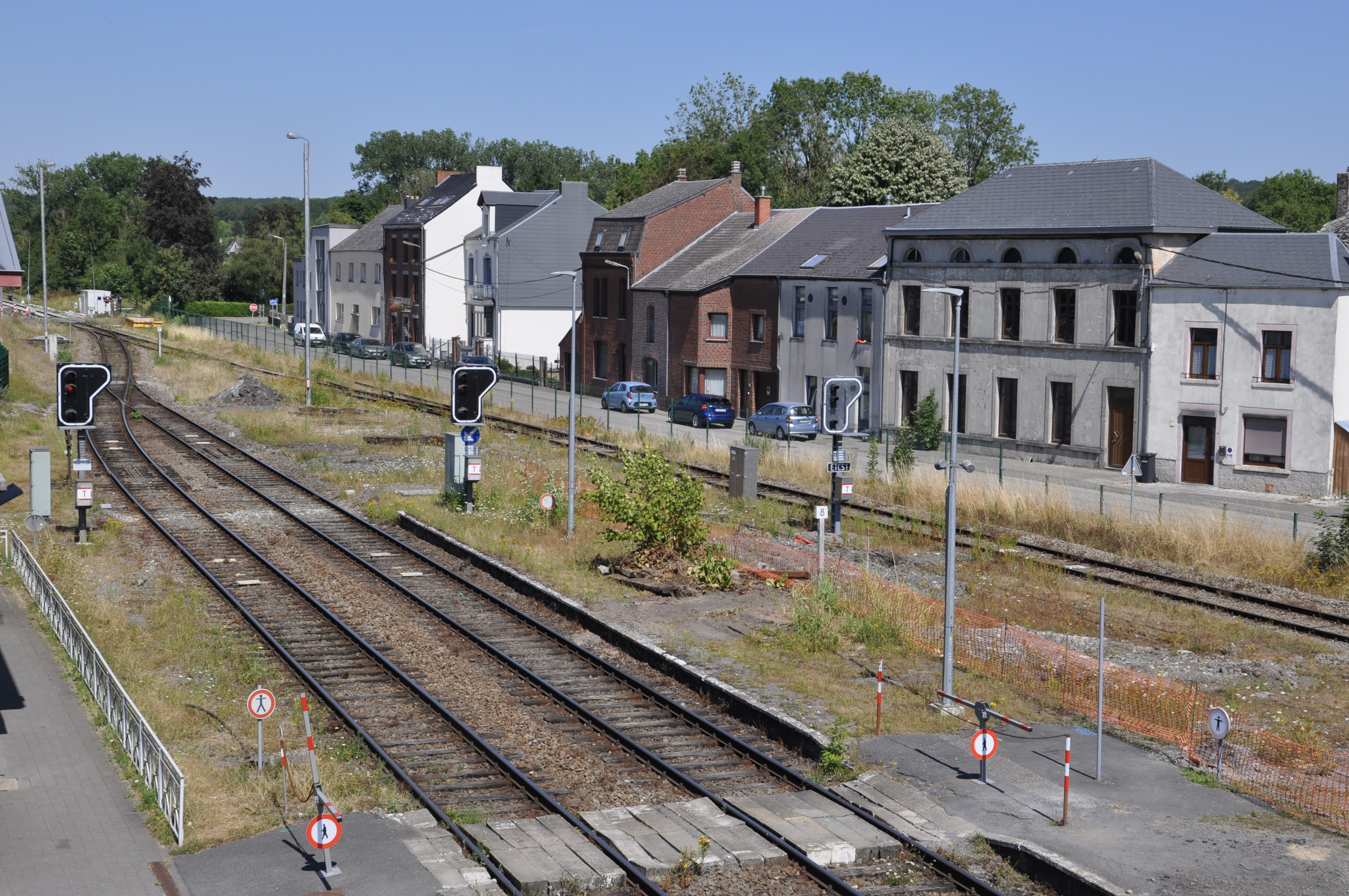
Rue Démasqué

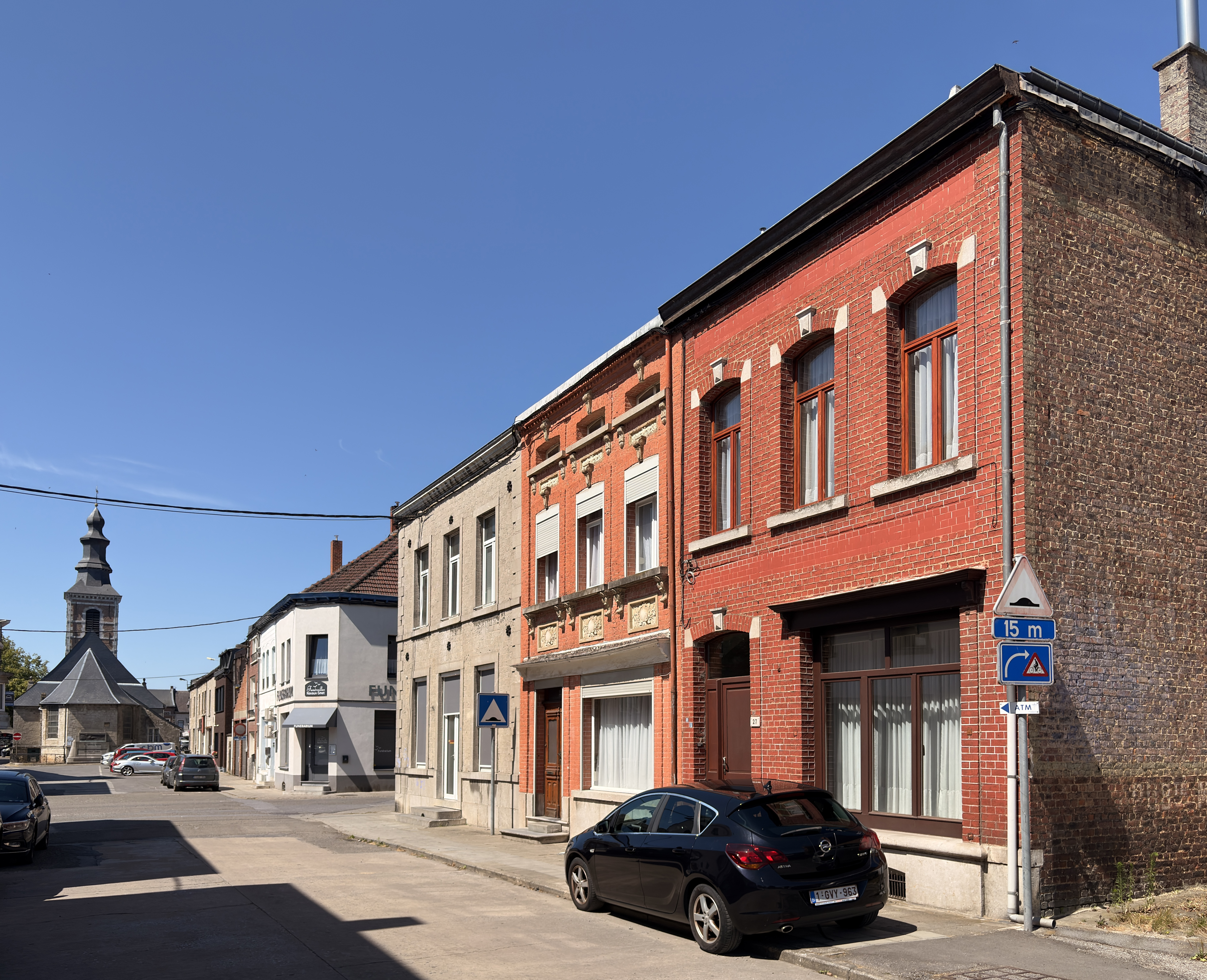
Rue Léopold Roger
