= Remoudou =

Belgian cheese

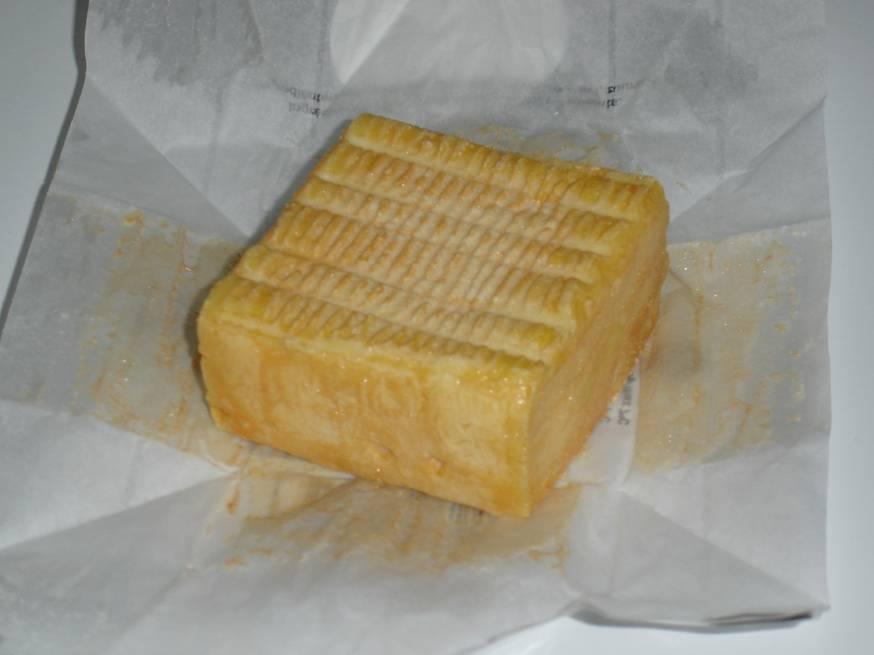
Remoudou

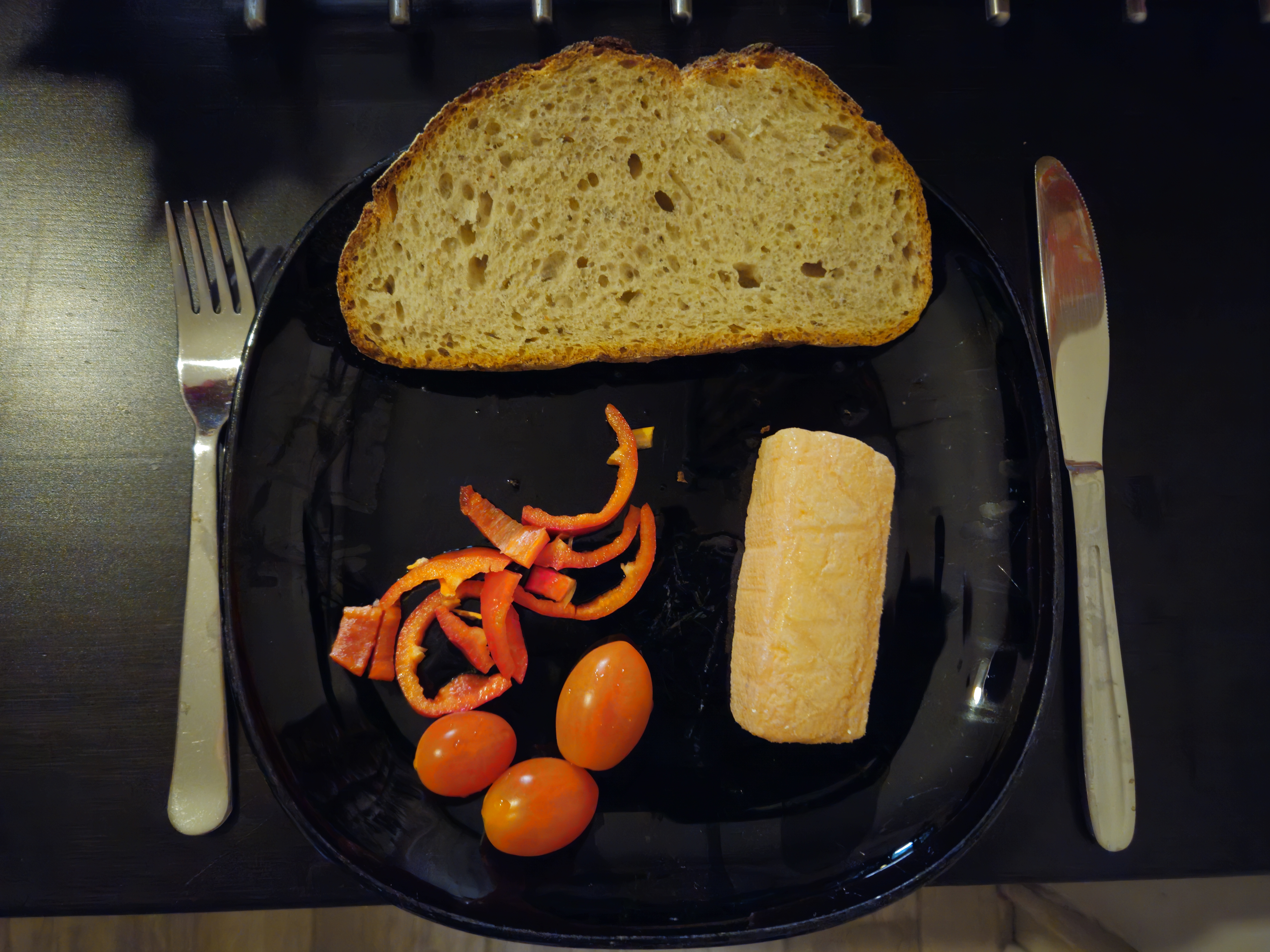
Romadour with tomatoes, chopped peppers, and a slice of bread.

Remoudou, or in Walloon r'moûdou, is a Belgian cheese from the Land of Herve. It derives its name from the use of milk from a second milking performed 15 minutes after the usual milking. Hence the Wallon verb rimoûd meaning "to re-milk". This cheese weighs 200 to 500 g. When it is washed with salt it gets a strong taste, and when washed with milk it keeps a mild taste. It is often sold in pieces.

It used to be called angelot and was offered as a gift. Sometimes called Fromage de Herve (cheese of Herve), it was stored fresh by Belgian merchants and sold in distant lands. Remoudou was present at the Leipzig and Frankfurt fairs in the 17th century, where it was traded by Herve men for Holstein cattle, and in Lorraine where the Herve merchants were called haverlings.

== See also ==
- Floreffe, a cheese similar to Remoudou
- List of cheeses
