= Boussu-en-Fagne =

Boussu-en-Fagne Boussu-el-Fagne (Walloon)
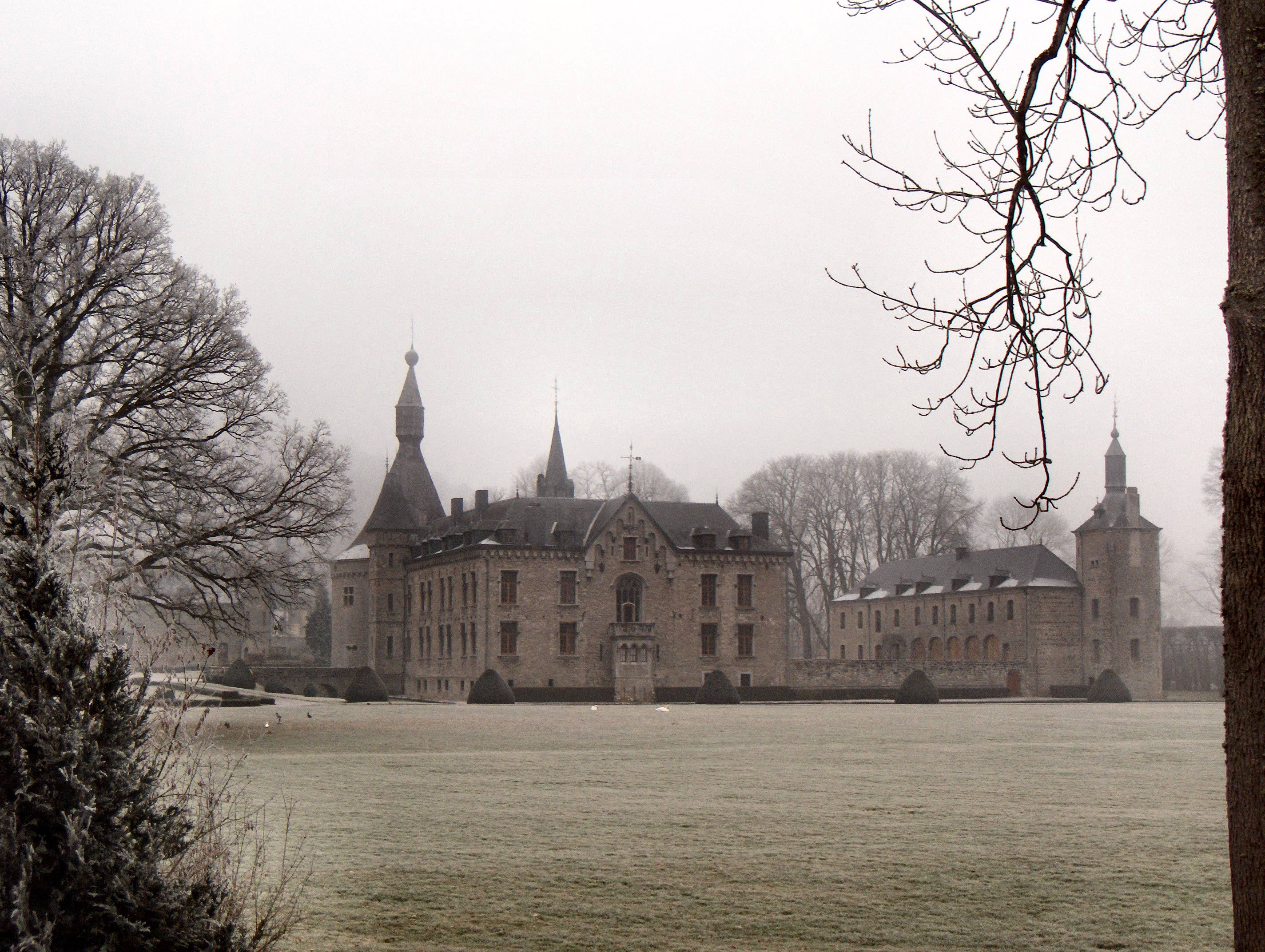
- Château de Boussu-en-Fagne

- Coat of arms

- Location within Belgium Location within Europe
- Coordinates: 50°04′N 04°28′E
- Country: Belgium
- Region: Wallonia
- Province: Namur
- Municipality: Couvin

Boussu-en-Fagne (French pronunciation: [busy ɑ̃ faɲ]; Walloon: Boussu-el-Fagne) is a village of Wallonia and a district of the municipality of Couvin, located in the province of Namur, Belgium.

Archaeological excavations in the area have revealed a Neolithic settlement as well as a large Roman villa, and a subsidiary Roman road. Merovingian graves have also been discovered. From the early Middle Ages, the territory gradually became part of the lands of the lords of Chimay. A forge operated in the village between 1494 and 1850. A castle, château de Boussu-en-Fagne, was built here, burnt down by Spanish troops before 1565 and successively rebuilt. Its current appearance is in a Gothic Revival style. In addition, there is a smaller manor house further along the road to Frasnes-lez-Couvin, called the manoir de la Motte. The current village church is from 1855.
