= Lefebvre Brewery =

Brewery in Belgium

Coordinates: 50°40′28.02″N 4°9′7.5″E

- Industry: Alcoholic beverage
- Founded: 1876
- Founder: Jules Lefebvre
- Headquarters: Quenast, Rebecq, Belgium
- Products: Beer
- Owner: Philippe Lefebvre
- Website: http://www.brasserielefebvre.be/en/page/3/home

The Lefebvre Brewery in Quenast, Wallonia, Belgium, was founded in 1876 by Jules Lefebvre. It produces a range of beers including Barbar, an 8% abv strong pale ale containing honey, and the Floreffe brand of abbey beers.

== Brands ==
The company produces a wide range of brands, including:

- Hopus, an 8.3% abv strong pale ale.
- Barbar, an 8% abv strong pale ale containing honey.

=== Floreffe ===
The Abbey of Floreffe was founded in 1121. In approximately 1250, a Mill-brewery was built within the Abbey. Upon the arrival of the French Revolution in 1794, the Abbey was abandoned by the monks. In 1960 the brewery was restored and run by the commercial brewery Het Anker brewery in Mechelen. In 1983, the Lefebvre Brewery took over production.

The Floreffe range: Blonde, Double, Floreffe Triple and Prima Melior.
