= Couvin =

City in Wallonia, Belgium

Couvin Couvén (Walloon)
- City and municipality
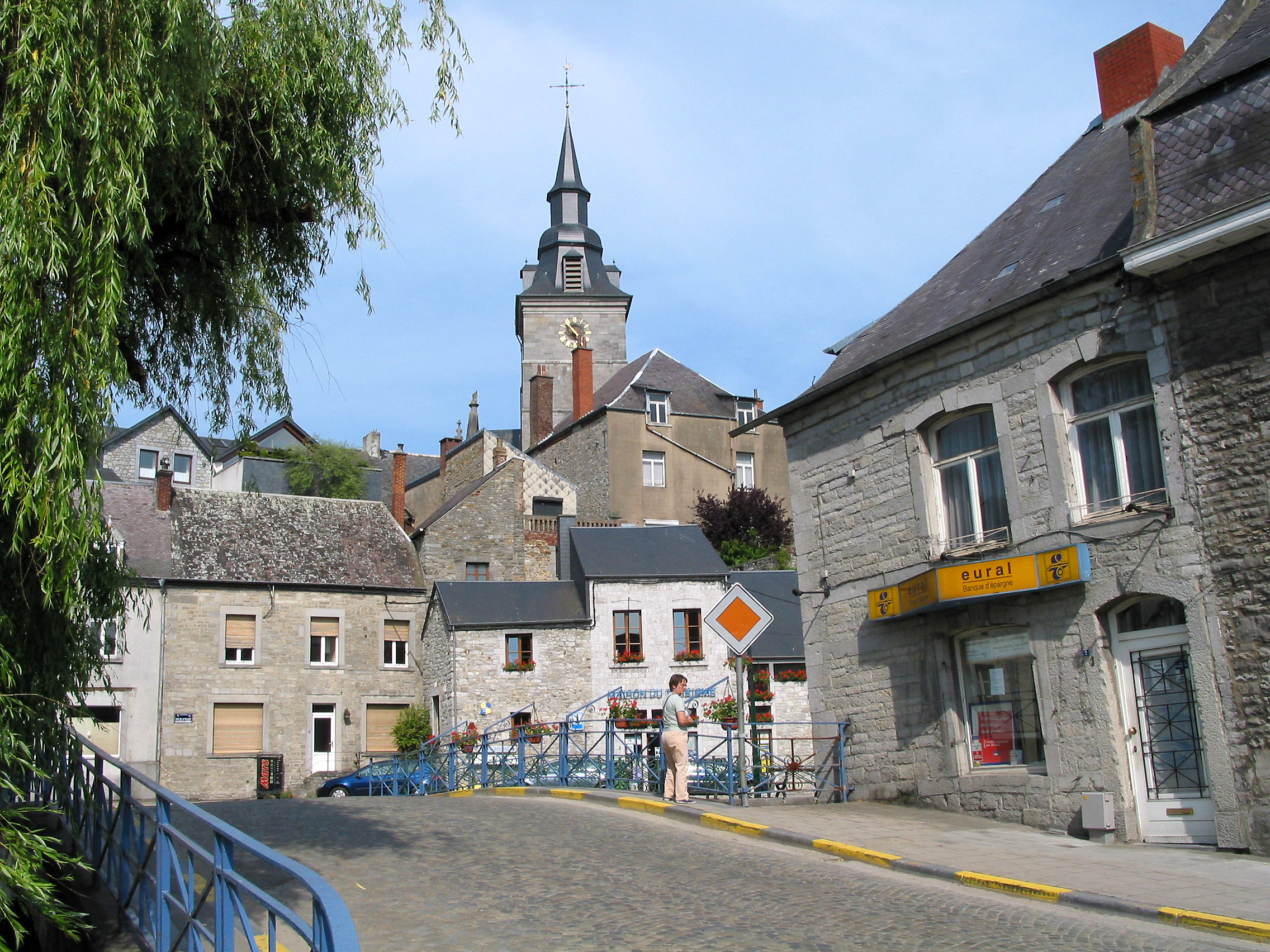

- Flag Coat of arms

- Location of Couvin in the province of Namur
- Interactive map of Couvin
- Location in Belgium
- Coordinates: 50°03′N 04°29′E
- Country: Belgium
- Community: French Community
- Region: Wallonia
- Province: Namur
- Arrondissement: Philippeville

Government
  - Mayor: Maurice Jennequin (cdH, CVN)
  - Governing parties: CVN (Couvin, Vous et Nous) - MR-IC

Area
  - Total: 206.97 km^{2} (79.91 sq mi)

Population (2018-01-01)
  - Total: 13,782
  - Density: 66.589/km^{2} (172.47/sq mi)
- Postal codes: 5660
- NIS code: 93014
- Area codes: 060
- Website: www.couvin.be

Couvin (French pronunciation: [kuvɛ̃]; Walloon: Couvén) is a municipality and city of Wallonia located in the province of Namur, Belgium.

On 1 January 2018 the municipality had 13,782 inhabitants. Couvin is the second largest municipality of Belgium by surface area, after Tournai. The total area is 206.93 km^{2} (79.90 sq mi), giving a population density of 67 inhabitants per square kilometre (170/sq mi).

The municipality consists of the following districts: Aublain, Boussu-en-Fagne, Brûly, Brûly-de-Pesche, Couvin, Cul-des-Sarts, Dailly, Frasnes-lez-Couvin, Gonrieux, Mariembourg, Pesche, Petigny, Petite-Chapelle, and Presgaux.

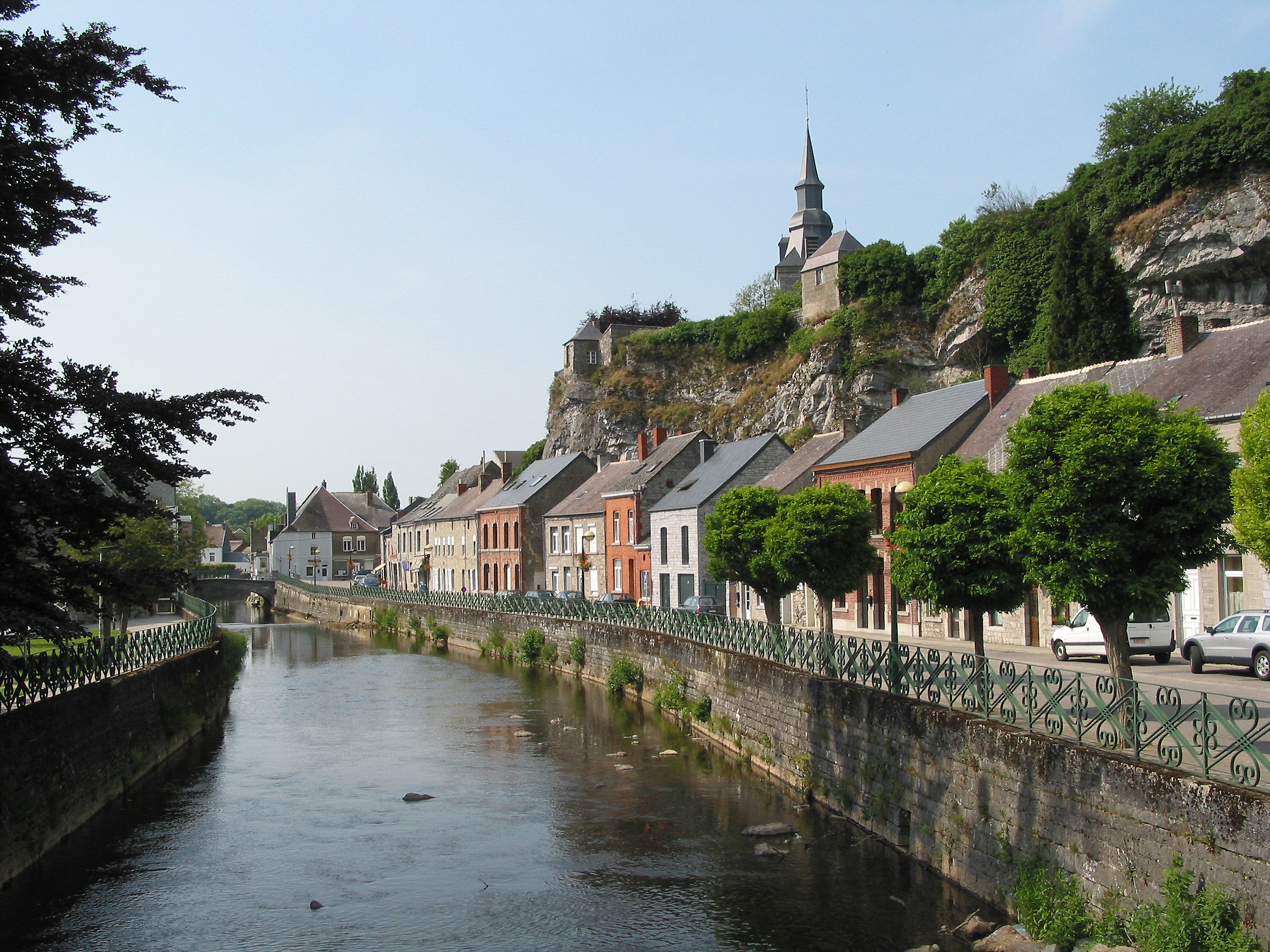
River Eau Noire and the Rue de la Falaise

== Transport ==
Couvin railway station provides the town with a rail link direct to Charleroi. The line terminates here; the next station is Mariembourg.

== Tourism ==
There are a number of sites of interest to tourists in the municipality.

One end of the Chemin de Fer à vapeur des Trois Vallées heritage railway is at Mariembourg. The Brasserie des Fagnes brewery is also situated there.

Caves in the area include the Trou de l’Abîme and the Neptune Caves.

Wolfsschlucht I, known locally as "Hitler's Bunker", is located at Brûly-de-Pesche. It was used as one of Adolf Hitler's military headquarters during the Battle of France.

== See also ==
- List of protected heritage sites in Couvin
