= List of protected heritage sites in Couvin =

This table shows an overview of the protected heritage sites in the Walloon town Couvin. This list is part of Belgium's national heritage.

Object	Year/architect	Town/section	Address	Coordinates	Number^{?}	Image
Ensemble of the rocks "de la Falaise" ^{(nl)} ^{(fr)}		Couvin Couvin		50.051425°N 4.495874°E	93014-CLT-0001-01 Info	Ensemble van de rotsen "de la Falaise"
False door (facades, roofs and passage), the Recollet Brother house (walls, roofs and the main cover except the conservatory and the construction of the 20th century, low pavillon (roofs and facades), high pavillon (facades and roofs), the adjacent walls, and next to the old cemetery of Recollectines, walls around plots 187b and 189 ^{(nl)} ^{(fr)}		Couvin Couvin	rue de la Montagne	50.051150°N 4.497360°E	93014-CLT-0002-01 Info	Valse deur (gevels, daken en passage), de huis van Frère Récollet (gevels, daken en de belangrijkste bekleding uitgezonderd de serre en de aanbouw uit de 20e eeuw, lage pavillon (daken en gevels), hoge pavillon (gevels en daken), aangrenzende muren en grenzend aan de oude begraafplaats van Récollectines, muren rond percelen 187b en 189 More images
Farm ^{(nl)} ^{(fr)}		Cul-des-Sarts Couvin	rue Grande, n°48	49.956710°N 4.451537°E	93014-CLT-0003-01 Info	
Tower of the church Saint-Georges ^{(nl)} ^{(fr)}		Gonrieux Couvin	Place des combattants	50.035763°N 4.426205°E	93014-CLT-0006-01 Info	Toren van de kerk Saint-Georges
Central Square (Grand Place) of Mariembourg ^{(nl)} ^{(fr)}		Mariembourg Couvin		50.094926°N 4.521147°E	93014-CLT-0007-01 Info	Centrale plein ('Grand Place') van Mariembourg More images
Tower of the old castle of Petigny ^{(nl)} ^{(fr)}		Petigny Couvin	rue Chéreulle n°s 10-16	50.058513°N 4.534177°E	93014-CLT-0008-01 Info	Toren van het oude kasteel van Petigny
Chapel Notre-Dame de Messines and ensemble of the chapel, the church of Saint-Marguerite, the oak tree and environment ^{(nl)} ^{(fr)}		Presgaux Couvin		50.024624°N 4.419430°E	93014-CLT-0009-01 Info	Kapel Notre-Dame de Messines en ensemble van de kapel, de kerk Saint-Marguerite, de eik en omgeving
Marsh at "Les Marais" ^{(nl)} ^{(fr)}		Cul-des-Sarts Couvin		49.958730°N 4.458936°E	93014-CLT-0010-01 Info	
Chapel Notre-Dame de la Bonne Pensee and the ensemble of the chapel and its surroundings ^{(nl)} ^{(fr)}		Pesche Couvin	rue Maurice Simon	50.045902°N 4.467748°E	93014-CLT-0011-01 Info	Kapel Notre-Dame de la Bonne Pensée en het ensemble van de kapel en diens omgeving More images
Two chapels on the rue des calvaires road, and the ensemble of buildings and the area around them ^{(nl)} ^{(fr)}		Couvin Couvin	rue des Calvaires	50.050266°N 4.501801°E	93014-CLT-0012-01 Info	Twee kapellen aan de weg rue des Calvaires, en het ensemble van de gebouwen en de plaats om hen heen
Old house of the bailiff: facades and roofs ^{(nl)} ^{(fr)}		Pesche Couvin	Place Saint-Hubert, 2	50.042865°N 4.458004°E	93014-CLT-0013-01 Info	Oud baljuwhuis : gevels en daken
Ensemble of the cemetery and the chestnut tree situated at the head of the church of Saint-Quentin ^{(nl)} ^{(fr)}		Dailly Couvin	rue de l'église	50.057730°N 4.435668°E	93014-CLT-0014-01 Info	Ensemble van de begraafplaats en de kastanjeboom gelegen aan de kop van de kerk van Saint-Quentin
Chapel Notre-Dame de la Brouffe ^{(nl)} ^{(fr)}		Mariembourg Couvin		50.092130°N 4.512568°E	93014-CLT-0015-01 Info	Kapel Notre-Dame de la Brouffe
Church of Saint-Lambert and the ensemble of the building and its surroundings ^{(nl)} ^{(fr)}		Aublain Couvin	Place Saint-Lambert	50.067003°N 4.408984°E	93014-CLT-0016-01 Info	
Presbytery and the ensemble of the building and its surroundings ^{(nl)} ^{(fr)}		Aublain Couvin	rue du Culot n°112	50.065987°N 4.408924°E	93014-CLT-0017-01 Info	
Farm Walkens: facades and roofs ^{(nl)} ^{(fr)}		Couvin Couvin	faubourg de la Ville n°7	50.052423°N 4.497852°E	93014-CLT-0018-01 Info	Boerderij Walkens: gevels en daken
Castle Boussu-en-Fagne, 16th-century tower (facades and roofs) and part of the main building including the entrance portico, the courtyard, outbuildings built in 1748, the dovecote, the access bridge, moat and surrounding wall and the ensemble of the castle and the park ^{(nl)} ^{(fr)}		Boussu-en-Fagnes Couvin	rue de la Station n°8	50.077067°N 4.470264°E	93014-CLT-0019-01 Info	Kasteel van Boussu-en-Fagne, toren van de 16e eeuw (gevels en daken) en deel van het hoofdgebouw waaronder de portiek van de entree, de binnenplaats, bijgebouwen uit 1748, inclusief de duiventoren, de toegangsbrug, slotgracht en de omliggende muur en het ensemble van het kasteel en het park More images
Bridge Baty, benches, linden trees and surrounding area ^{(nl)} ^{(fr)}		Petigny Couvin		50.060337°N 4.530584°E	93014-CLT-0020-01 Info	Brug van Baty, banken, lindebomen en omliggende terreinen More images
Mansion of Motte: facades and roofs and the ensemble of the building and surrounding area ^{(nl)} ^{(fr)}		Boussu-en-Fagnes Couvin	rue de la Motte, n°15	50.078797°N 4.474600°E	93014-CLT-0021-01 Info	Herenhuis van Motte: gevels en daken en het ensemble van het gebouw en de omliggende terreinen More images
Drum Castle Court: facades and roofs, except the building adjacent to the west of the house, and the ensemble of the castle and its surroundings ^{(nl)} ^{(fr)}		Couvin	Hameau de Géronsart, 15	50.099604°N 4.492324°E	93014-CLT-0022-01 Info	Kasteel van Tromcourt: gevels en daken, uitgezonderd het gebouw grenzend aan het westen van het huis, en het ensemble van het kasteel en zijn omgeving
Farm Forge: facades and roofs, except the old stables at the rear of the west wing and the stables on the north side sandwiched between two existing buildings, the exterior wall of the northern barn, detached barn to the east, and the ensemble of the farm and the surrounding area ^{(nl)} ^{(fr)}		Boussu-en-Fagnes Couvin	chemin Fosset n°1	50.079708°N 4.458505°E	93014-CLT-0023-01 Info	
Chateau Saint-Roch: facades and roofs, excluding annexes, farm Saint-Roch (facades and roofs) with the exception of sheds, stables (facades and roofs), ruins of the driveway to the former furnace, the bridge-dam on the Eau Noire with its cast-iron balustrade, and the ensemble of these buildings and the park of Saint-Roch ^{(nl)} ^{(fr)}		Couvin Couvin	route de Frasnes n°s 6-16	50.061607°N 4.496362°E	93014-CLT-0024-01 Info	
Center Brûly-de-Pesche, with meadows and gardens around the main buildings, namely the church of Saint-Meen and the cemetery, the old rectory, former school construction and the lime tree ^{(nl)} ^{(fr)}		Brûly-de-Pesche Couvin		50.001919°N 4.456751°E	93014-CLT-0026-01 Info	Centrum van Brûly-de-Pesche, met weide en tuinen rond de belangrijkste gebouwen, namelijk de kerk Saint-Méen en het kerkhof, de oude pastorie, de voormalige school en aanbouw en de linde More images
Steam locomotive type EX26 ^{(nl)} ^{(fr)}		Couvin		50.092198°N 4.530214°E	93014-CLT-0027-01 Info	
Kiosk and a protection zone limited to public space ^{(nl)} ^{(fr)}		Le Brûly Couvin	place Ch. Claes	49.968642°N 4.527738°E	93014-CLT-0028-01 Info	
Facades, roofs, trim, basements and interior structures of the former town hall of Couvin ^{(nl)} ^{(fr)}		Couvin Couvin	Grand Place	50.051784°N 4.496946°E	93014-CLT-0029-01 Info	Gevels, daken, bekleding, kelders en interieurconstructies van de voormalige hal van Couvin
Facades, roofs and interiors of 'Maison du Concierge "adjacent to the town hall of Couvin ^{(nl)} ^{(fr)}		Couvin Couvin	Grand Place	50.051848°N 4.496952°E	93014-CLT-0030-01 Info	
The site of the hole Abîme including the ensemble of the rocks of "de la Falaise" ^{(nl)} ^{(fr)}		Couvin Couvin		50.050016°N 4.498316°E	93014-PEX-0001-01 Info	De site van het gat van Abîme met inbegrip van het ensemble van de rotsen van "de la Falaise"

== See also ==
- List of protected heritage sites in Namur (province)
- Couvin
