= Joseph Hanse =

Belgian linguist

Joseph Hanse (5 October 1902 – 7 November 1992) was a Belgian linguist from Floreffe.
