= Aublain =

Aublain Åblén (Walloon)
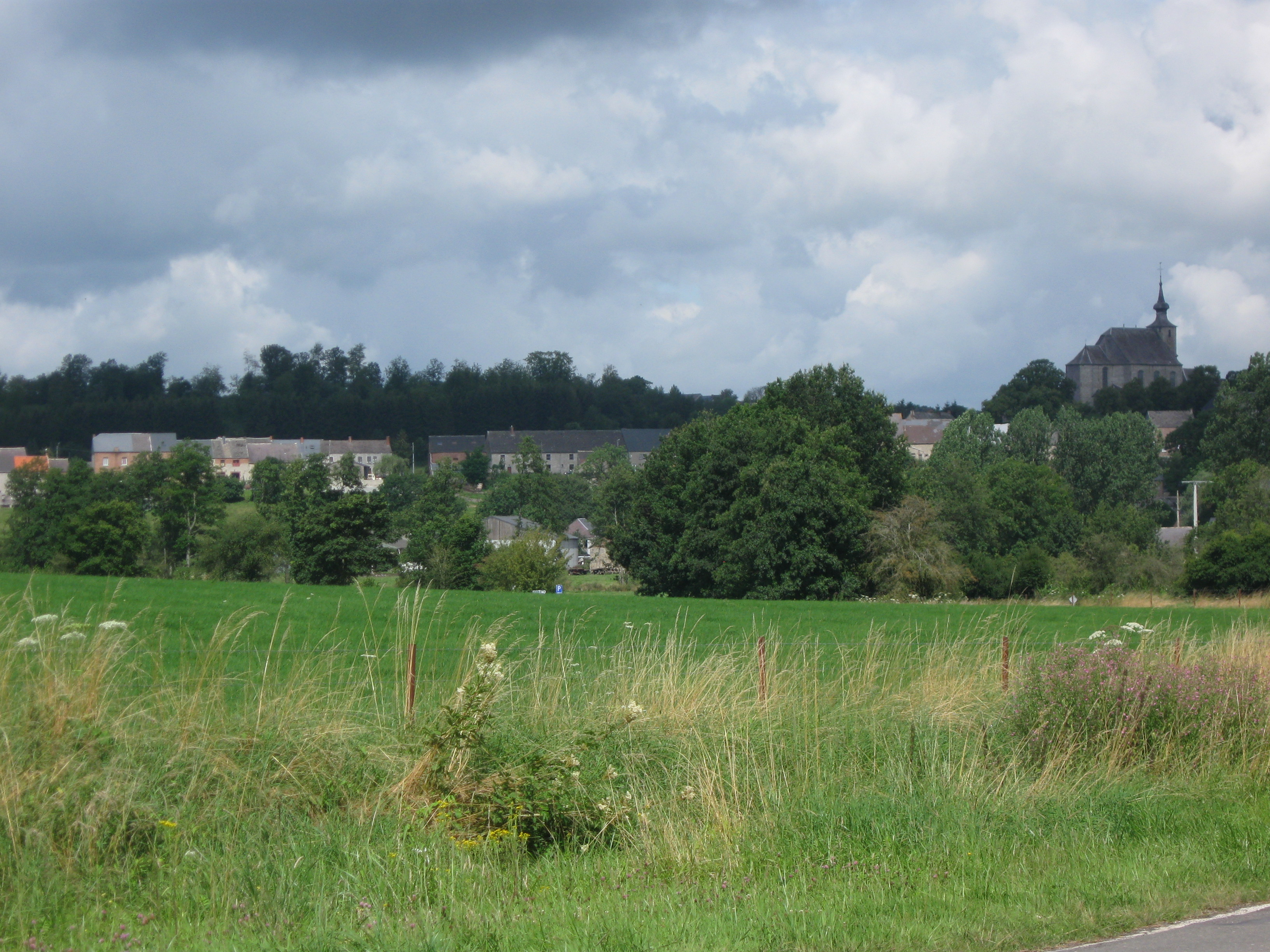
- Aublain

- Location within Belgium Location within Europe
- Coordinates: 50°04′04″N 04°24′39″E
- Country: Belgium
- Region: Wallonia
- Province: Namur
- Municipality: Couvin

Aublain (French pronunciation: [oblɛ̃]; Walloon: Åblén) is a village of Wallonia and a district of the municipality of Couvin, located in the province of Namur, Belgium.

A Gallo-Roman settlement possibly existed here during antiquity. During the Middle Ages, the village became part of the domains of the County of Hainaut. Count Baldwin II sold it to Otbert of Liège in 1093. A castle was built in the village in 1518 by a member of the Sezeille family, who had acquired the village in 1434. The castle has not been preserved. The village contains a chapel from the 17th century, a mill from the 18th century and some farms that trace their origins to the Middle Ages.
