= Floreffe =

Municipality in Wallonia, Belgium

Floreffe Florefe (Walloon)
- Municipality
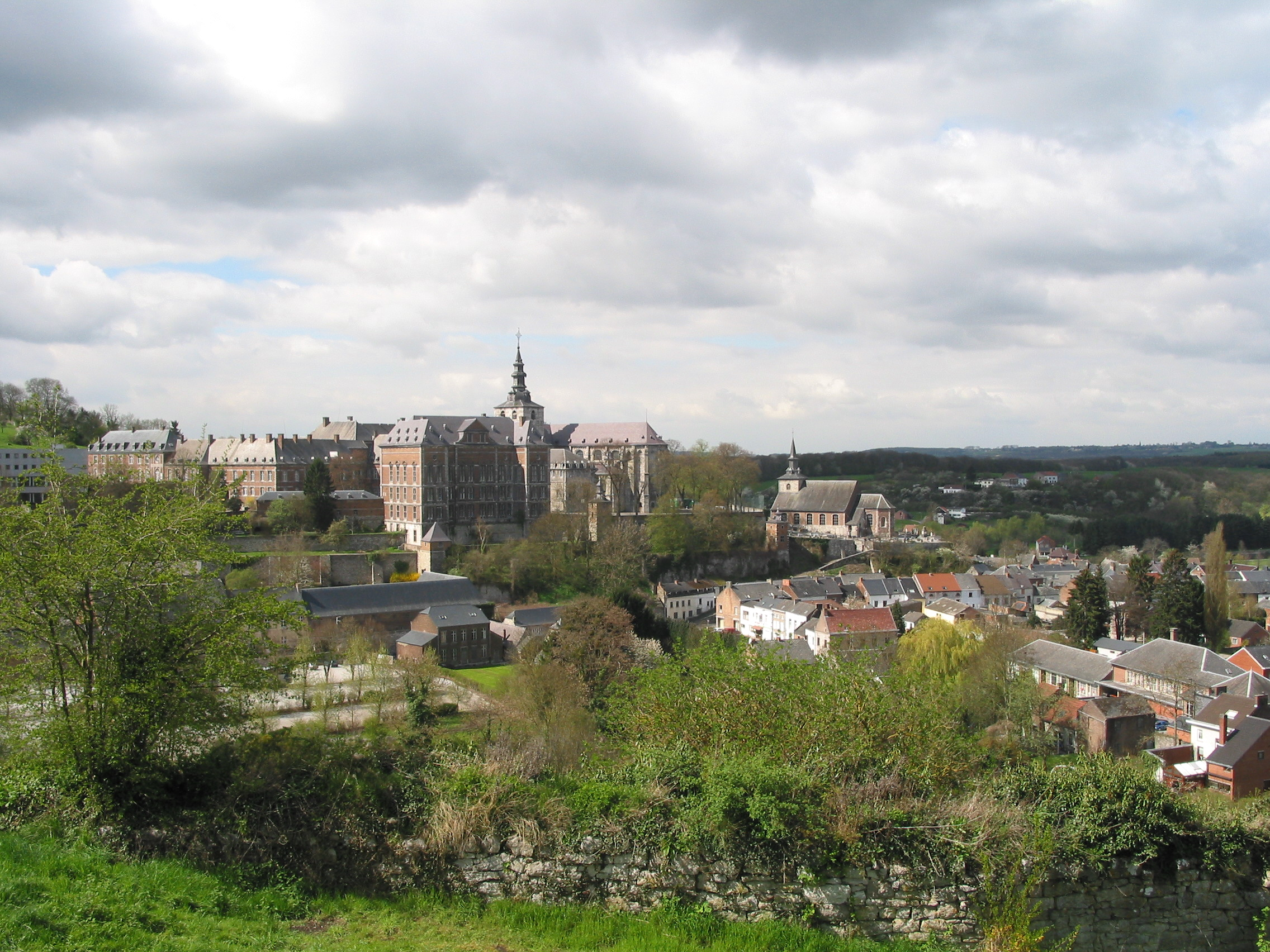

- Flag Coat of arms

- Location of Floreffe in Namur Province
- Interactive map of Floreffe
- Location in Belgium
- Coordinates: 50°26′N 04°47′E
- Country: Belgium
- Community: French Community
- Region: Wallonia
- Province: Namur
- Arrondissement: Namur

Government
  - Mayor: Philippe Vautard (RPF)
  - Governing party: RPF-DéFI

Area
  - Total: 39.12 km^{2} (15.10 sq mi)

Population (2018-01-01)
  - Total: 8,114
  - Density: 207.4/km^{2} (537.2/sq mi)
- Postal codes: 5150
- NIS code: 92045
- Area codes: 081
- Website: www.floreffe.be

Floreffe (French pronunciation: [flɔ.ʁɛf]; Walloon: Florefe) is a municipality of Wallonia located in the province of Namur, Belgium.

On 1 January 2012 the municipality had 7,883 inhabitants. The total area is 38.89 km^{2}, giving a population density of 203 inhabitants per km^{2}.

The municipality consists of the following districts: Floreffe, Floriffoux, Franière, and Soye.

In 1977, the newly expanded (thus newly adjoining) municipality of Profondeville was given Lakisse, an area in the southeast of the original Floreffe.

Floreffe is best known as the location of Floreffe Abbey, founded in the 12th century and suppressed during the French Revolution.

== Notable people ==
- Joseph Hanse (1902–1992), Belgian linguist

== Twin towns ==
- Prata di Pordenone, Italy

== See also ==
- List of protected heritage sites in Floreffe
