= Floreffe cheese =

Belgian cheese

Floreffe is a triple-cream Belgian cheese made with non fermented whole milk, and enriched with crème fraiche to reach 75% of fat. It does not have a rind and traditionally weighs 200 g. It is close to triple-cream Remoudou and Crâmeû.

Despite its name, there is no connection between the cheese and Floreffe Abbey.

== See also ==
- List of cheeses
