= Quenast =

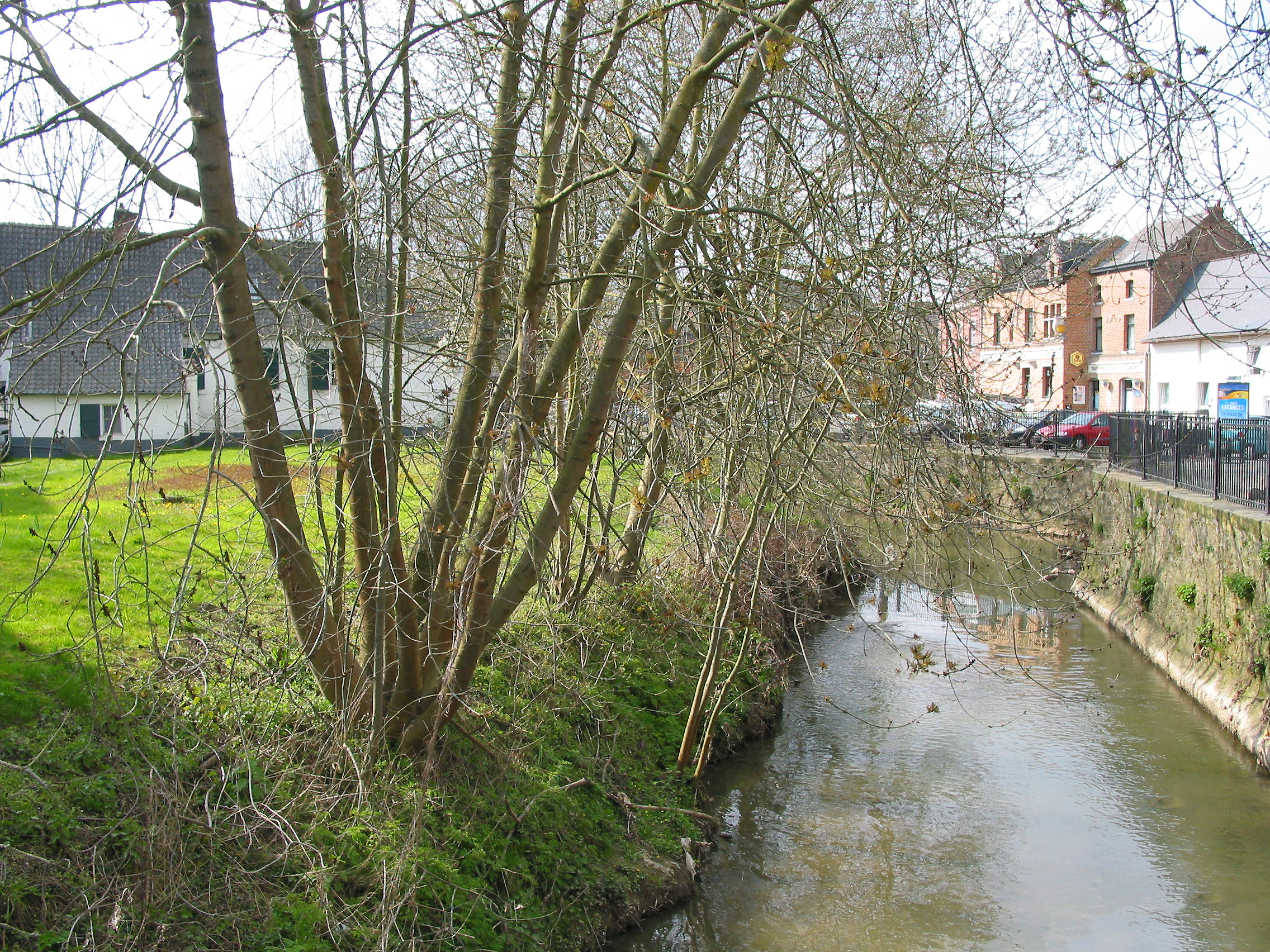
- Quenast

- Location within Belgium Location within Europe
- Coordinates: 50°40′00″N 04°09′00″E
- Country: Belgium
- Region: Wallonia
- Province: Walloon Brabant
- Municipality: Rebecq

Quenast is a village and district of the municipality of Rebecq, located in the province of Walloon Brabant, Belgium.

The village was part of the County of Hainaut and subservient to the castellan of Braine-le-Comte until the French Revolution and the French invasion of the Austrian Netherlands. The village church dates from 1855 but has an organ from 1596. There is a large quarry for porphyry in Quenast. The Lefebvre Brewery has operated in Quenast since 1876.
