= Neptune Caves =

Show caves near Couvin, Belgium

Coordinates: 50°3′57.73″N 4°30′43.32″E

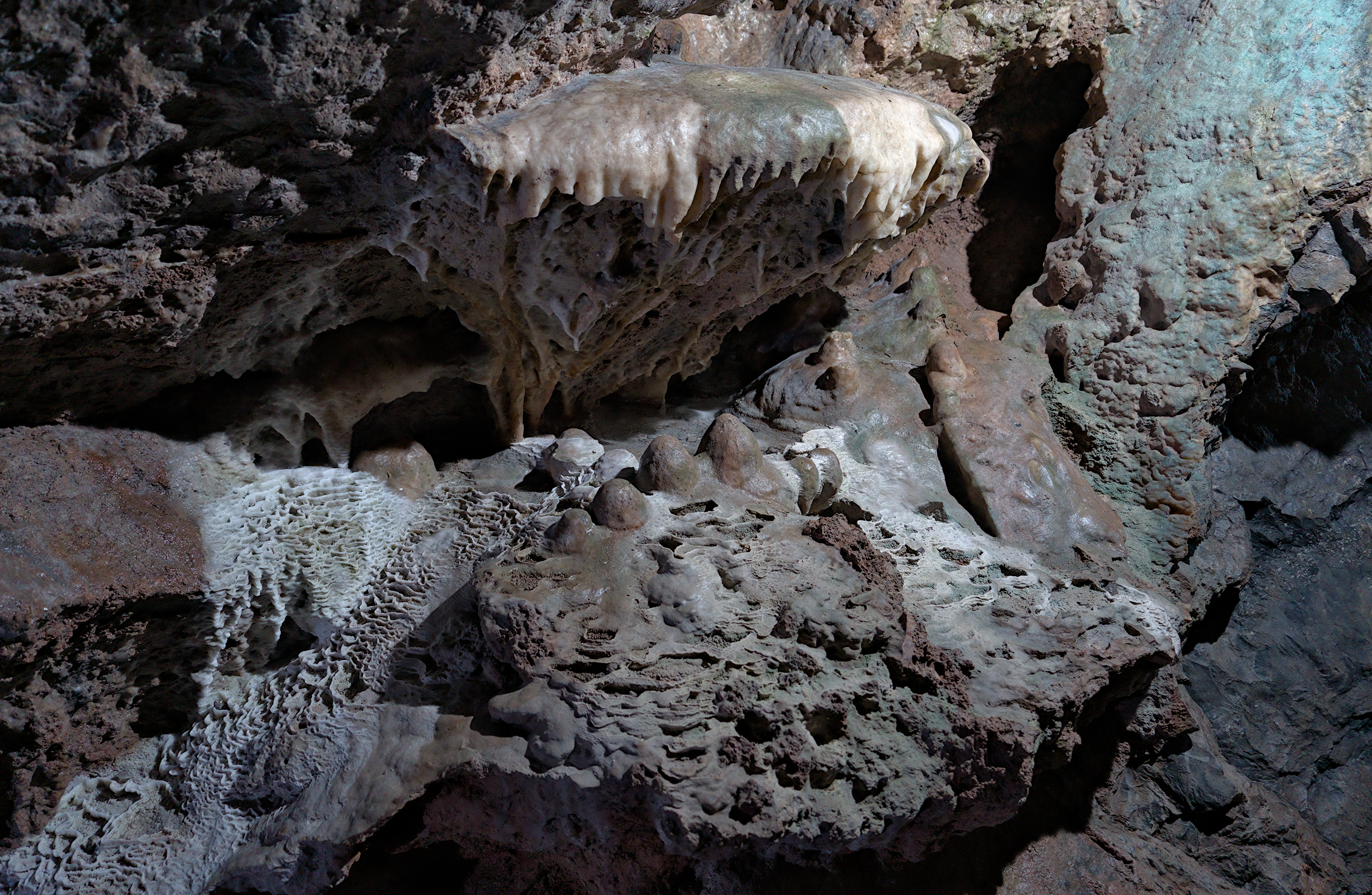
Speleothems in the Neptune Caves

The Neptune Caves (French: Grottes de Neptune), also known as the Grottes de l'Adugeoir are a series of natural caves located in Wallonia near Petigny in the municipality of Couvin, Belgium. They are located on the Eau Noire river, a tributary of the Meuse.

Many of the chambers are accessible to the public via a guided tour, partially via boat on the underground river.
