= Trou de l'Abîme =

Caves and archaeological site in Belgium

Trou de l’Abîme cave
- Couvin Cave
- Location in Belgium
- 50°3′1″N 4°29′51″E
- Periods: Palaeolithic
- Associated with: Neanderthals
- Location: near Couvin, Province of Namur
- Region: Wallonia, Belgium

Site notes
- Material: limestone

Trou de l’Abîme also known as La caverne de l'Abîme and Couvin Cave is a karst cave located in Wallonia on the right bank of the Eau Noire river in the center of Couvin, Belgium, in Namur province. During various archaeological excavations of sediment deposits, Mousterian artefacts and a Neanderthal molar were discovered.

== Description ==
The site consists of a large two level cave with the entrance on the upper level of the western face of an Eifelian limestone cliff and a large terrace which forms a rock shelter of 50 m (160 ft) width and 5 m (16 ft) depth.

== Archaeology ==
Excavations of the cave entrance were first conducted in 1887 and 1902 but the evidence recovered from these is lost. There is lithic and paleontological material from a 1905 excavation but as these were found in reworked sediments from the earlier excavations the context has been lost.

In a series of excavations between 1984 and 1985 Palaeolithic stone artifacts and Pleistocene faunal remains were uncovered. Most of the lithic material is flint which had to be transported to the site from a mine at least 30 km (19 mi) away. Associated with the material was a partial human molar. At the time it was found scientists were unable to determine whether it was Homo sapiens or Neanderthal. A 2009 study was able to identify it as belonging to a Neanderthal child. The soil of the layer where the tooth was found has been estimated to be between 42,000 and 40,000 years old which the authors state "is consistent with both a recently obtained accelerator mass spectrometry dating result at 44,500 BP and the published conventional date." The AMS date is that of a horse tooth found in the same layer.

The 1905 artifacts have been associated with a variety of prehistoric cultures, such as Solutrean, Mousterian, Proto-Solutrean and a transitional culture in between the Middle and Upper Paleolithic. As of 2016 the assemblage from both the 1905 excavation and the 1980s excavations is considered to be Mousterian.
