= Wolfsschlucht I =

One of Adolf Hitler's headquarters

Coordinates: 50°00′06″N 4°27′33″E

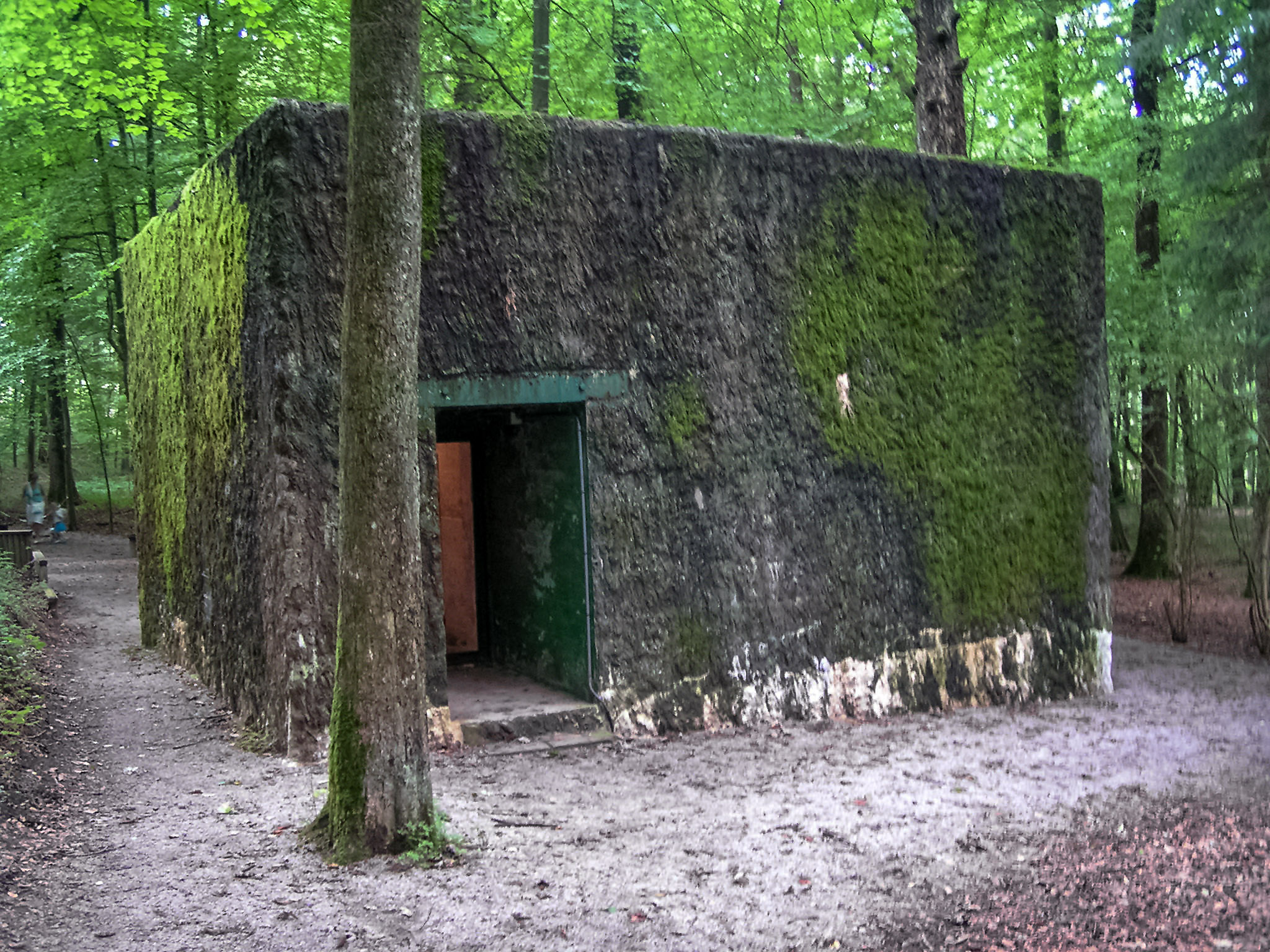
One of the two bunkers which made up the complex

Führerhauptquartier Wolfsschlucht I (Wolf's Gorge) was the codename for one of Adolf Hitler's military headquarters, located in a farmhouse near the Belgian village of Brûly-de-Pesche, in the municipality of Couvin, close to the French border. It was occupied by Hitler between 6–24 June 1940 while awaiting the conclusion of the Battle of France.
