= Pays de Herve =

Natural region in Wallonia, Belgium

Coordinates: 50.65°N 5.83°E

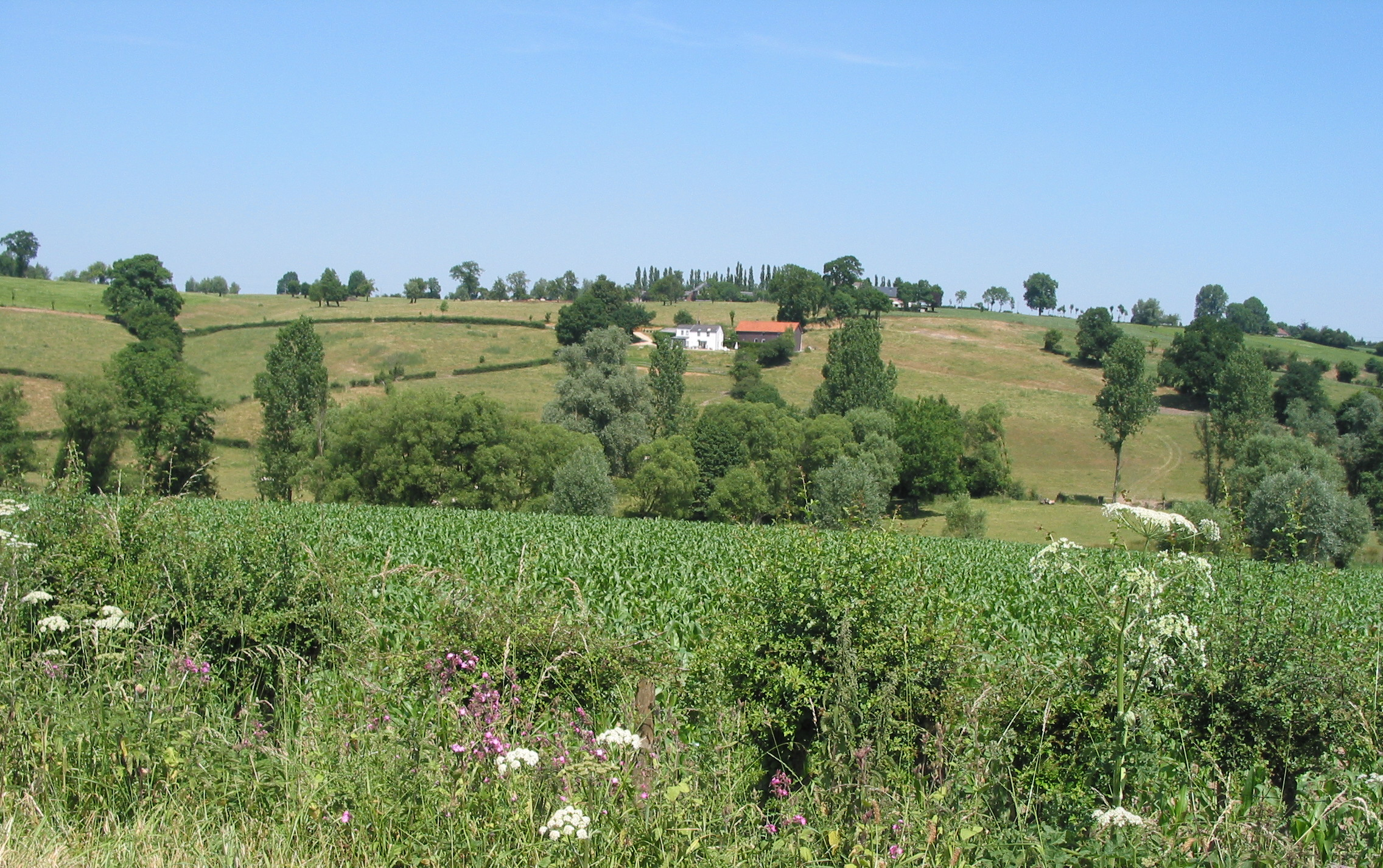
A typical landscape in the Pays de Herve

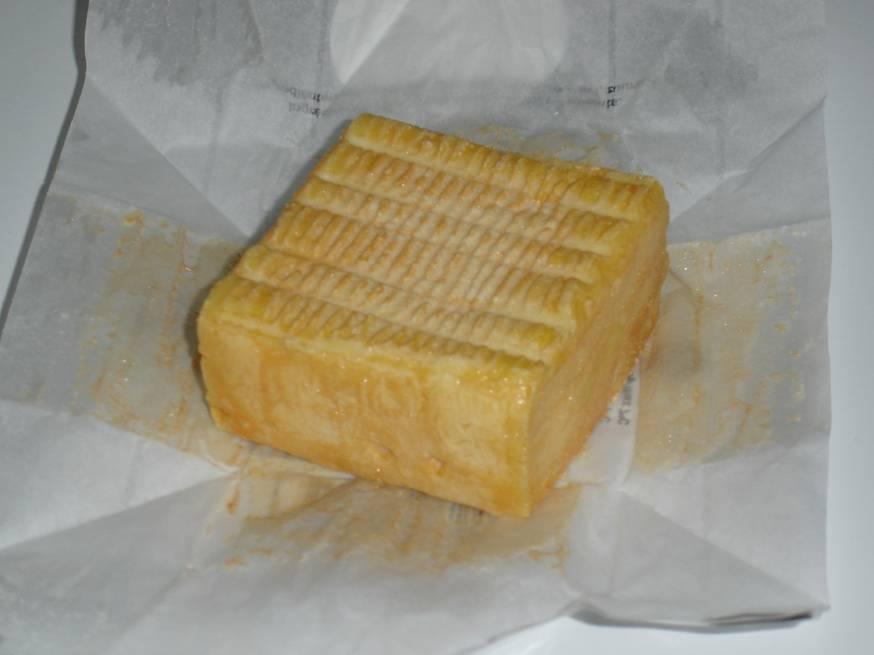
Herve cheese

The Pays de Herve (Land of Herve; Dutch: Herve-land) is a 420 km^{2} natural region of Wallonia, between the rivers Vesdre and Meuse and the borders separating Belgium from the Netherlands and Germany.

The region is named after the ancient town of Herve, which is at its centre.

Economically the Pays de Herve mainly has an agricultural character. The region is known for Herve cheese.

== Towns ==
Population centres in this region are: Aubel, Beyne-Heusay, Blegny, Dalhem, Fléron, Herve, Olne, Plombières, Soumagne, Thimister-Clermont, Visé, Voeren and Welkenraedt.

== Maps ==
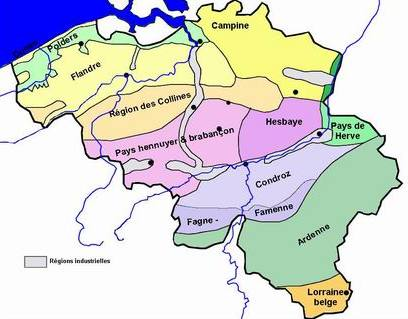
The natural regions of Belgium. The Pays de Herve is in the east.

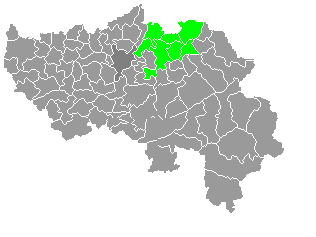
The Pays de Herve in the Province of Liège.

Belgium in Europe
