= Floreffe Abbey =

Coordinates: 50.4335°N 4.7579°E

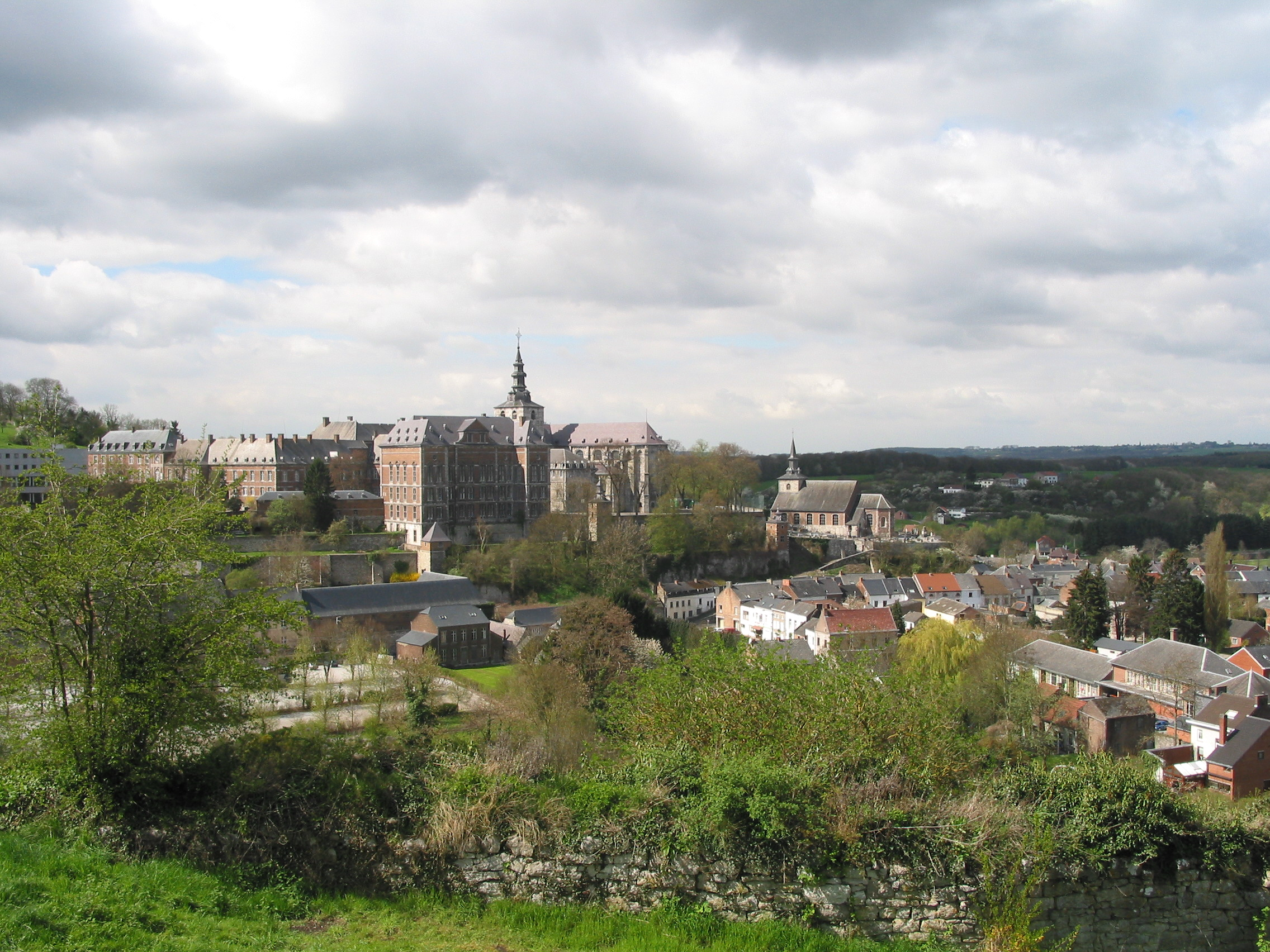
Floreffe Abbey and town

Floreffe Abbey (French: Abbaye de Floreffe) is a former Premonstratensian monastery, the second of the order to be founded, situated on the Sambre at Floreffe, about 11 km (6.8 mi) south-west of Namur, Wallonia, Belgium.

== History ==
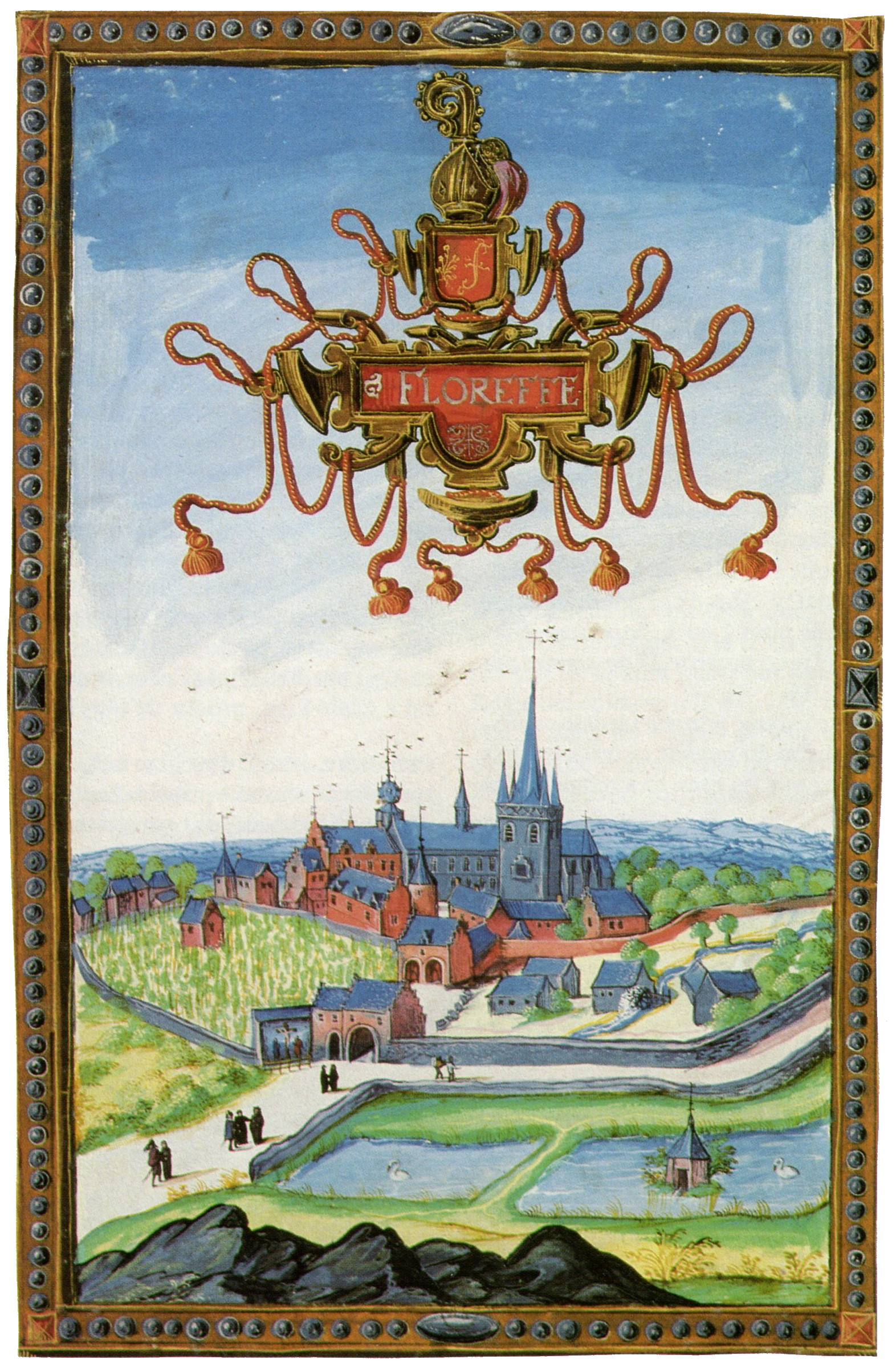
Floreffe Abbey in 1604. Albums of Croÿ.

When Norbert of Xanten, founder of the Premonstratensian Order, was returning from Cologne in the year after its foundation with relics for his new church at Prémontré, Godfrey, Count of Namur, and his wife Ermensendis received him in their castle at Namur. He made such an impression on them that they asked him to found a house at Floreffe nearby. The charter by which they made over a church and house to Norbert and his order is dated 27 November 1121, so that Floreffe is, chronologically speaking, the second abbey of the order. Norbert laid the foundations of the church, which was called Salve ("Save"); the abbey was named Flos Mariae (the "Flower of Mary").

The chronicles of the abbey relate that while celebrating mass at Floreffe, Saint Norbert saw a drop of blood issuing from the sacred host onto the paten. Distrusting his own eyes, he said to the deacon who assisted him: "Brother, do you see what I see?" "Yes, Father" answered the deacon, "I see a drop of blood which gives out a brilliant light". The altar stone on which the saint celebrated mass is still preserved at Floreffe.

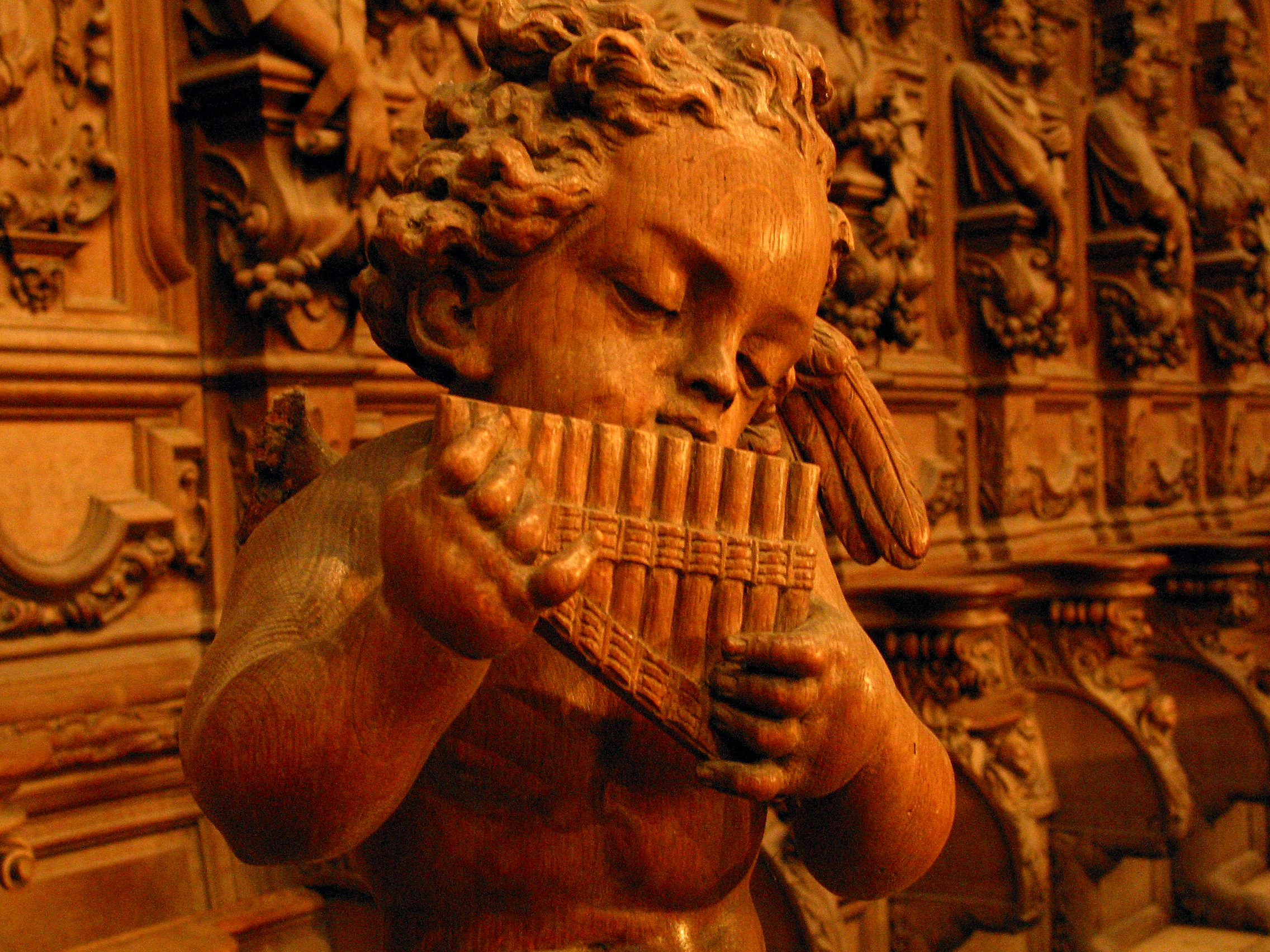
Stalls in the Abbey Church (1632–1648)

Saint Norbert made Richard, one of his first disciples, the first abbot. The second abbot, Almaric, was commissioned by Pope Innocent II to preach the gospel in Palestine. Accompanied by a band of chosen religious of Floreffe, he journeyed to the Holy Land and founded the abbey of St. Habacuc (1137). Philip, Count of Namur, gave to Weric, the sixth abbot, a large piece of the True Cross which he had received from his brother Baldwin, Emperor of Constantinople. The chronicles record that twice, namely in 1204 and 1254, blood flowed from this relic on the Feast of the Invention of the Holy Cross, the miracle being witnessed by the religious and by a large crowd of people. At the suppression of Floreffe Abbey, the relic was removed to a place of safety. When, years later, the Norbertine canons, who had been expelled from France, bought an old Augustinian monastery at Bois-Seigneur-Isaac, it was restored to them.

Floreffe Abbey founded a number of other religious houses, including the abbeys of Postel and Leffe.

== Burials ==
- Godfrey I, Count of Namur
- Ermesinde of Luxembourg, Countess of Namur

== Suppression ==
Louis de Fromantau, elected in 1791, was the fifty-fifth and last abbot of Floreffe. When the French Republican army invaded Belgium the religious were expelled, and the abbey was confiscated along with all its possessions. Put up for sale in 1797, it was bought back for the abbot and his community by Canon Richald masquerading as a Republican. After the Concordat of 1801 the abbot and a few of the monks returned to the abbey, but the difficulties were so great that after the death of the last of them the abbey became the property of the Bishop of Namur, who set up a seminary here.

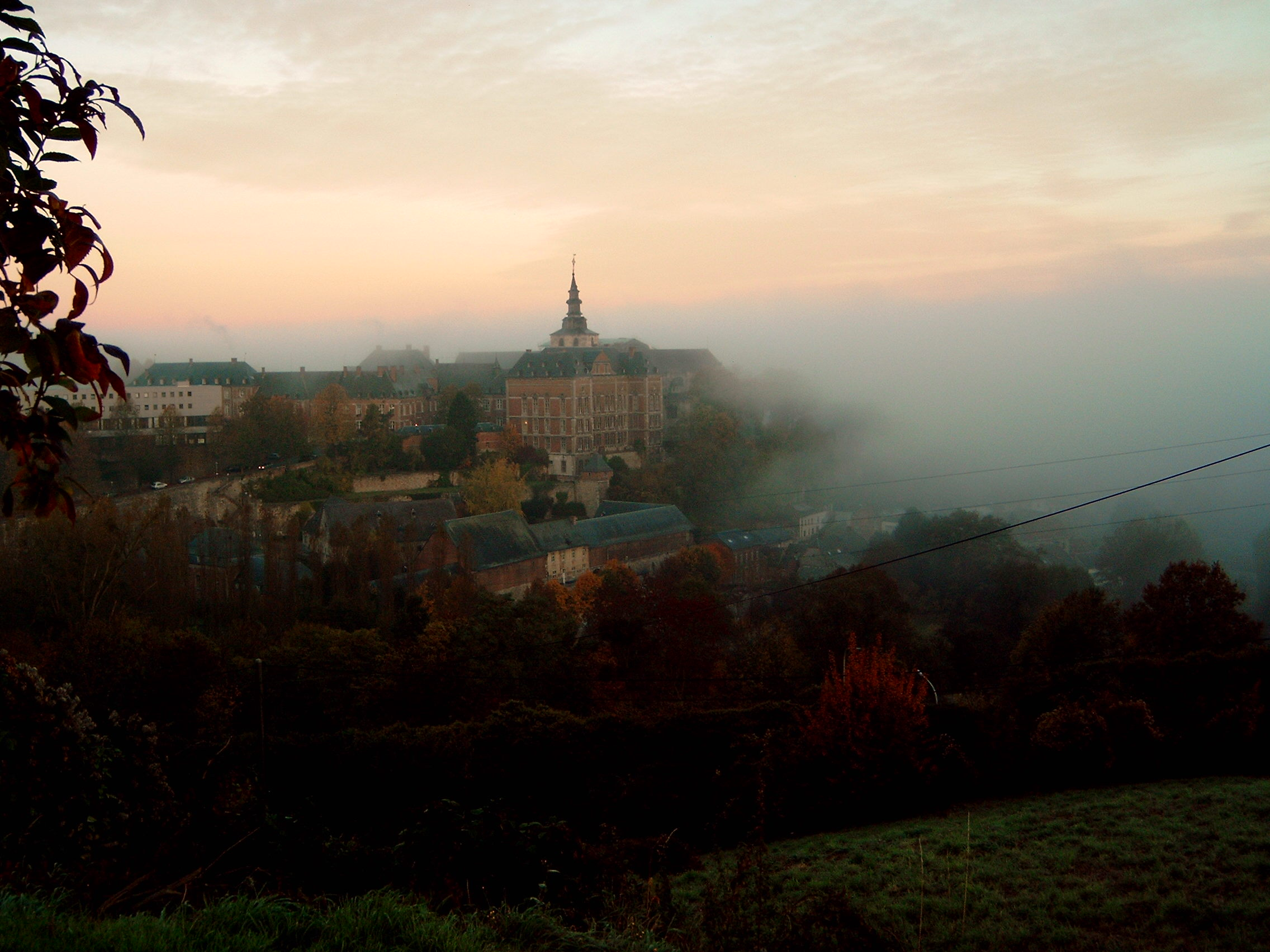
Floreffe Abbey

== Seminary ==
The seminary is no longer in operation. It has become a school (elementary and secondary). Much of the earlier buildings survives and the authorities of the school welcome visitors.

== Products ==
The abbey beer "Floreffe" is produced for the abbey by Brasserie Lefebvre, it is available in various styles: blonde, double, triple, blanche and prima melior.

Despite its name, the abbey has no ties with the cheese of the same name.
