= Landestheater Detmold =

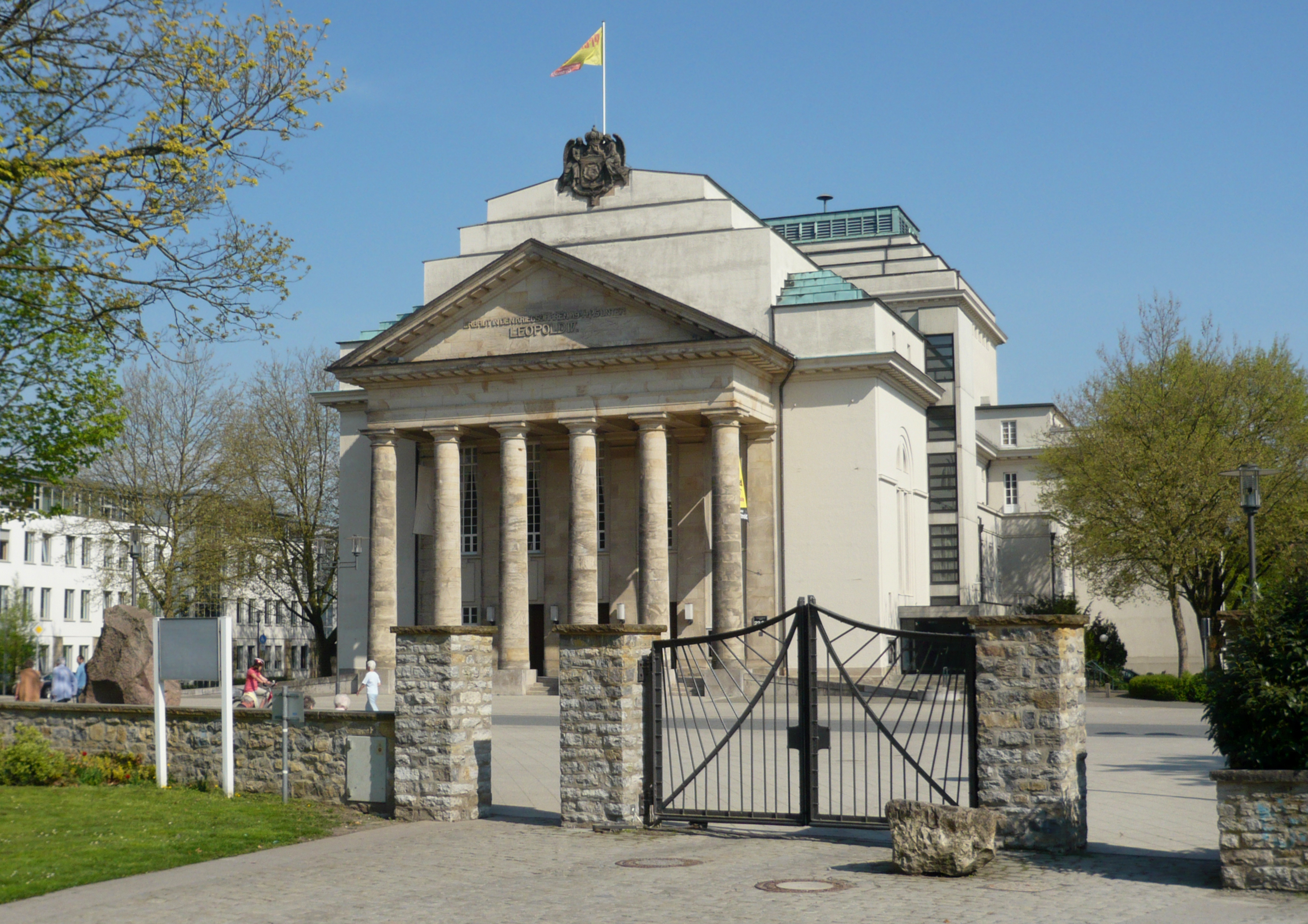
- Front of the 1915 theatre
- Interactive map of the Landestheater Detmold area
- Former names: Hochfürstliches Lippisches Hoftheater

General information
- Location: Detmold, North Rhine-Westphalia, Germany
- Coordinates: 51°56′17″N 8°52′45″E
- Completed: 1825

Design and construction
- Architects: Johann Theodor von Natorp (1825); Bodo Ebhardt (1915)

Website
- www.landestheater-detmold.de

Landestheater Detmold is a theatre for operas, operettas, musicals, ballets, and stage plays in Detmold, North Rhine-Westphalia, Germany. It began as the Hochfürstliches Lippisches Hoftheater, founded in 1825 by the court of Lippe. The company has five venues in Detmold. With its guest appearances in more than a hundred locations in Germany and neighboring countries, the theatre company states that it is the largest touring company in Europe.

== History ==
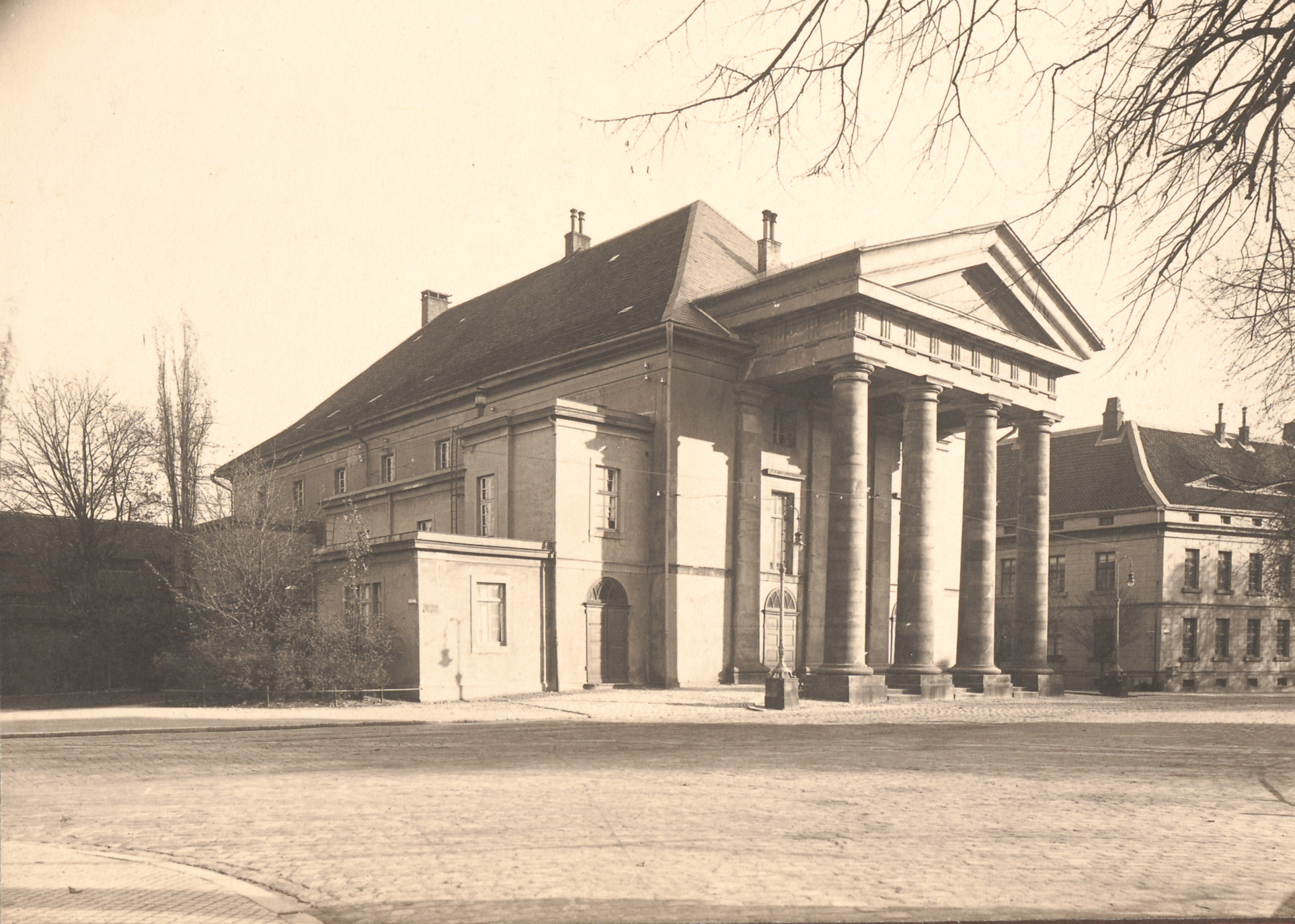
The court theatre c. 1910

In 1820 Leopold II, Prince of Lippe, with the support of his mother Princess Pauline, decided to have a court theatre built in Detmold. He commissioned the architect Johann Theodor von Natorp. The groundbreaking ceremony took place on 18 April 1825.

On 8 November 1825, the curtain of the Hochfürstliches Lippisches Hoftheater went up for the first time for Mozart's opera La clemenza di Tito, after only seven months of construction. August Pichler was appointed director of the new theatre. The respected Pichler troupe had been guests in the old Detmold comedy house. The program included both musical theatre and plays. Famous artists working at the theatre included Christian Dietrich Grabbe (as author and dreaded critic) and Albert Lortzing (as singer, actor and Kapellmeister.)

On 5 February 1912, during the performance of Hermann Sudermann's Der Bettler von Syrakus, the theatre burned down to its foundation, due to a faulty chimney. It was rebuilt in the years 1914–1918 during World War I, after plans by the Berlin architect Bodo Ebhardt. The ongoing season could be provisionally brought to a close in the Detmolder Sommertheater. The new building was financed with donations by citizens of Detmold, funds of the Royal House, bank loans, and donations from citizens all over Germany. Its corner stone was laid on the Prince's birthday, 30 May 1914. The last loan was terminated in 1968, fifty years after the building was finished. The four columns of the original building remained in the new facade. Before reopening, ownership of the theater building passed into the hands of the Free State of Lippe. It reopened on 28 September 1919 with Lortzing's opera Undine.

Like all German theatres, it had to close during World War II, on 1 September 1944. After the war, the British occupying forces set up their officers' mess there. The performance operation was therefore relocated to the Detmolder Sommertheater. On 5 July 1952, the building was released and the performance operation resumed. Otto Will-Rasing was artistic director from 1926 to 1969. Paul Sixt was Generalmusikdirektor (GMD). He had been co-responsible for the exhibition Degenerate music in Düsseldorf in 1938.

== Landestheater Detmold Orchestra ==
The Fürstlich-Lippische-Hofkapelle, founded in 1834, is considered the predecessor of the orchestra of the Landestheater. The Detmold palace was the residence of the Principality of Lippe. Renowned composers such as Lortzing and Johannes Brahms worked in Detmold.

After World War II, the music ensemble took on the duties of a theatre orchestra for the Landestheater Detmold, focusing on opera, operetta, musical and ballet. The program included demanding productions as Handel's Alcina and Purcell's King Arthur. In addition, there were operas by Mozart, Giacomo Puccini, Giuseppe Verdi and Richard Wagner, as well as operas by contemporary composers Giselher Klebe, Hans Werner Henze and Udo Zimmermann. Operettas were given composed by Franz Lehár, Johann Strauss and Karl Millöcker, and also, increasingly, musicals. Productions of Wagner's stage works began with Tannhäuser in 1952, followed by Die Meistersinger von Nürnberg in 1953, Der fliegende Holländer in 1954, Lohengrin in 1955, Parsifal in 1957 and Die Walküre in 1958.

In the 2001/02 season, part of the productions moved into the symphonic area under the leadership of GMD Erich Wächter. Additionally, the orchestra participated in festivals and major choral concerts, proving its versatility. A new series of stagings of Wagner's works began in the same season with Lohengrin, followed by productions of Tannhäuser, Parsifal, Der Ring des Nibelungen, Die Meistersinger von Nürnberg and Der fliegende Holländer.

== Current operation ==
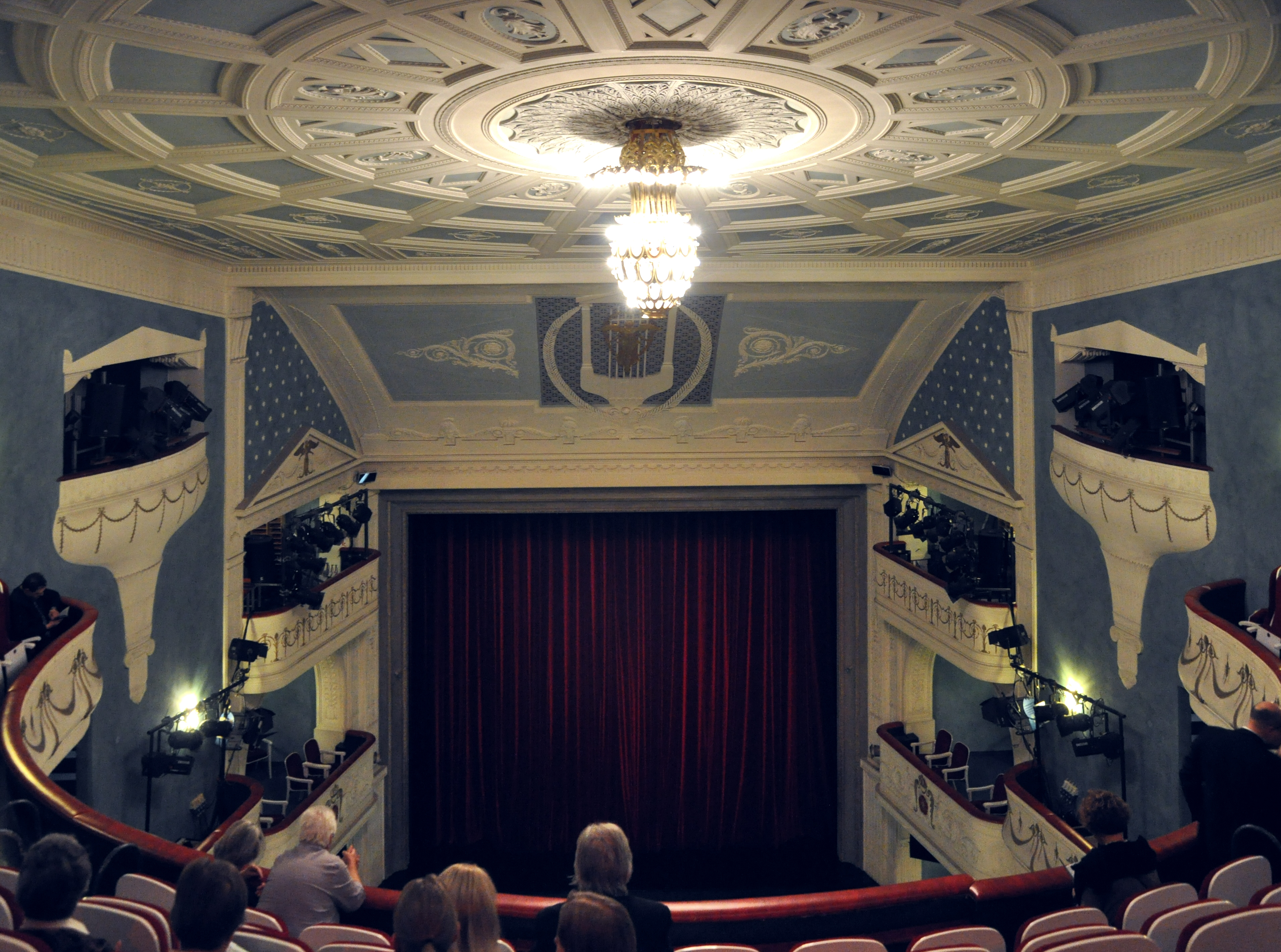
Hall of the Landestheater Detmold in 2014

The Landestheater Detmold has five venues at its home in Detmold: the Landestheater itself with 650 seats, the Kleine Bühne in the Grabbe-Haus with 80 seats, the Hoftheater in the courtyard with 250 seats, the Detmolder Sommertheater with 350 seats, and since March 2009 the newest stage KASCHLUPP!, the children's and youth stage.

Today, the Landestheater Detmold presents itself as the largest traveling company in Europe. Half of the nearly 300 performances in a season are held outside of Detmold. Thus, the Landestheater fulfills its cultural mandate to provide towns without their own ensemble with theatre culture. It is one of five Landesbühnen (state theatres) in North Rhine-Westphalia, and the only one with both a musical theatre and a dance ensemble. It covers the area of the entire state of North Rhine-Westphalia, and beyond to Belgium, Luxembourg, and more recently even to Switzerland.

The Landestheater Detmold provides its operation as a three-division theatre with opera, ballet and plays. The current general director is Kirsten Uttendorf, who previously was opera director at the Staatstheater Darmstadt. Her predecessors included Georg Heckel (2018–2024), Kay Metzger (2004–2018), Ulf Reiher (1987-2004), and Gerd Nienstedt (1985–1987).

== Literature ==
- Gesetzliche Ordnungen für das Hochfürstl. Lippesche Hoftheater. Detmold 1828 – LLB Detmold (in German)
- Gesetzliche Ordnungen für das Hochfürstl. Lippesche Hoftheater. Anhang : Nachtrag zu den bestehenden Theatergesetzen. Detmold 1842 – LLB Detmold (in German)
- Ralph Bollmann: Walküre in Detmold. Eine Entdeckungsreise durch die deutsche Provinz, Klett-Cotta, 240 S. (2011) (in German)
