= Stadtgymnasium Detmold =

Europaschule Stadtgymnasium Detmold
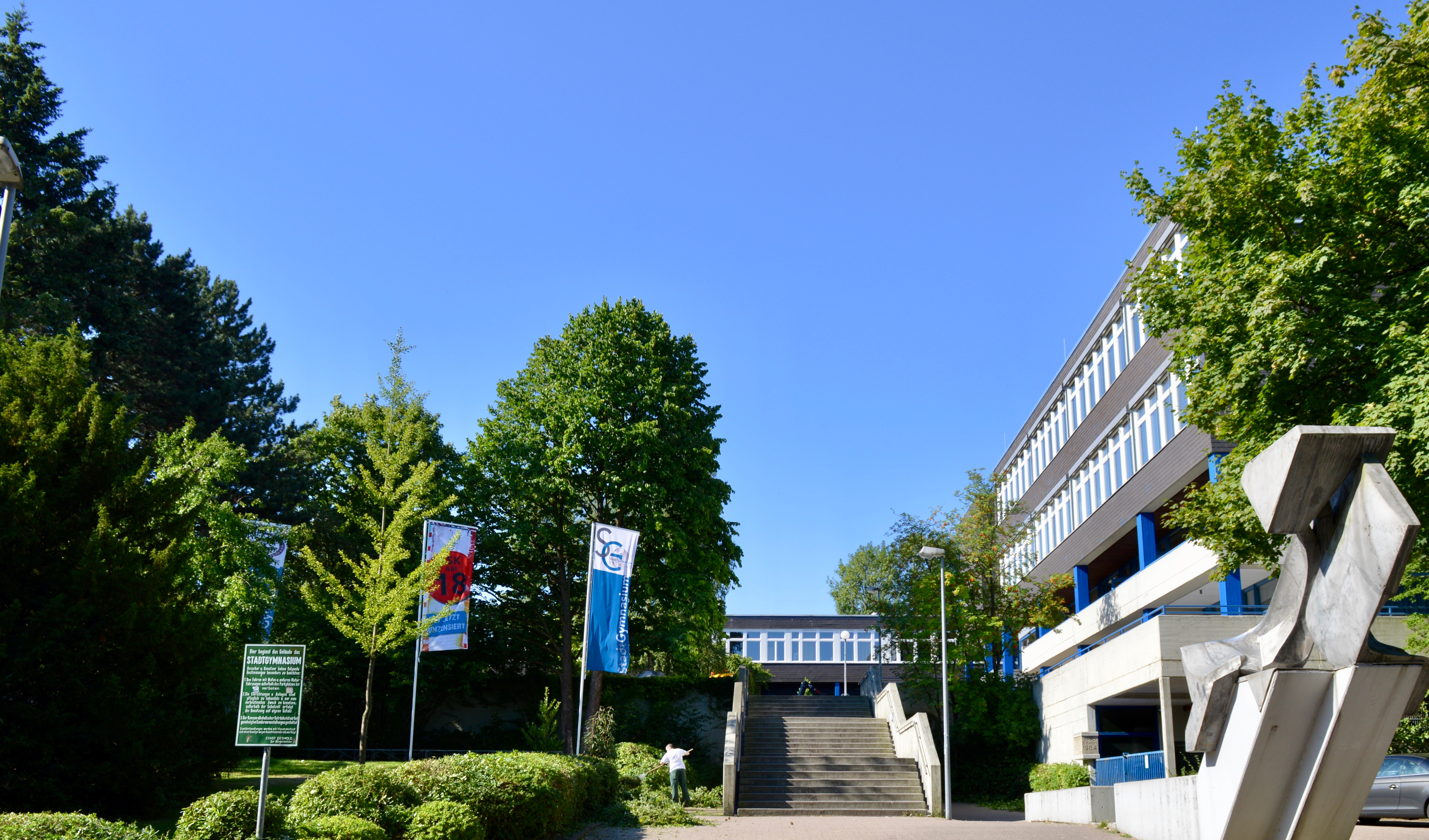
- Stadtgymnasium Detmold - viewed from Martin-Luther-Str

Location
- Martin-Luther-Straße;4; Lippe district 32756 Detmold, North Rhine-Westphalia; Germany
- Coordinates: 51.9344°N 8.8606°E

Information
- School type: Public Gymnasium
- Founded: 1830; 196 years ago
- Principal: Carsten Paul
- Teaching staff: 65 (as of 2018)
- Grades: 5 to 12
- Gender: Coeducational
- Website: www.stadtgymasium.eu

Stadtgymnasium Detmold is a Gymnasium (grammar school) in Detmold in the German state of North Rhine-Westphalia. Founded in 1830, Stadtgymnasium Detmold is the second oldest Gymnasium in Detmold.

== History ==
In March 1830, General Superintendent Ferdinand Weerth proposed his sovereign Prince Leopold II a plan to lay foundations of a "daughter school" in Detmold. Prince Leopold II approved the plan on March 10, 1830. In the following decades, the "daughter school" transformed into the present city's grammar school.

The school moved three times: it was located at Hornschen Tor (Leopoldsstraße) from 1830 to 1831, at Exterstraße from 1840 to 1871, and at Am Wall from 1871 to 1966, where it was rebuilt in 1911. It has been located at the Detmold Stadtgymnasium at Hiddeser Berg since 1966, in a building designed by the Osnabrück architect Friederich Helbrecht. Located next to the school building, it has an external specialist wing for biology, chemistry, physics, and art, which can be reached via a red closed bridge. There was once an emergency hospital under the building until the end of the 1990s. The rooms of the former emergency hospital have been used by the city archives since 2015. The original building, consisting of the main building, the specialist wing, and the gymnasium, was first supplemented by another gymnasium and then by a classroom building.

=== School names ===
- 1871-1893 Höhere Töchterschule
- 1893-1912 Städtische Höhere Mädchenschule, municipal
- 1912-1928 Städtisches Lyzeum
- 1928-1938 Städtische Oberlyzeum
- 1938-1950 Städtische Oberschule für Mädchen
- 1950-1960 Städtisches neusprachliches Mädchengymnasium mit Frauenoberschule (Municipal girls' grammar school with women's high school)
- 1960-1966 Städtisches Mädchengymnasium Detmold mit neusprachlichem und sozialwissenschaftlichem Zweig und Frauenoberschule (Municipal girls' high school in Detmold with new language and social science branch and women's secondary school)
- 1966–present Stadtgymnasium Detmold

== Today ==
Stadtgymnasium Detmold attaches great importance to education in modern languages, music, art, natural sciences, mathematics and social sciences. In December 2016, Stadtgymnasium was recognized as a European School by the Ministry of Education of North Rhine-Westphalia.
