= Jürgen Jasperneite =

German engineer

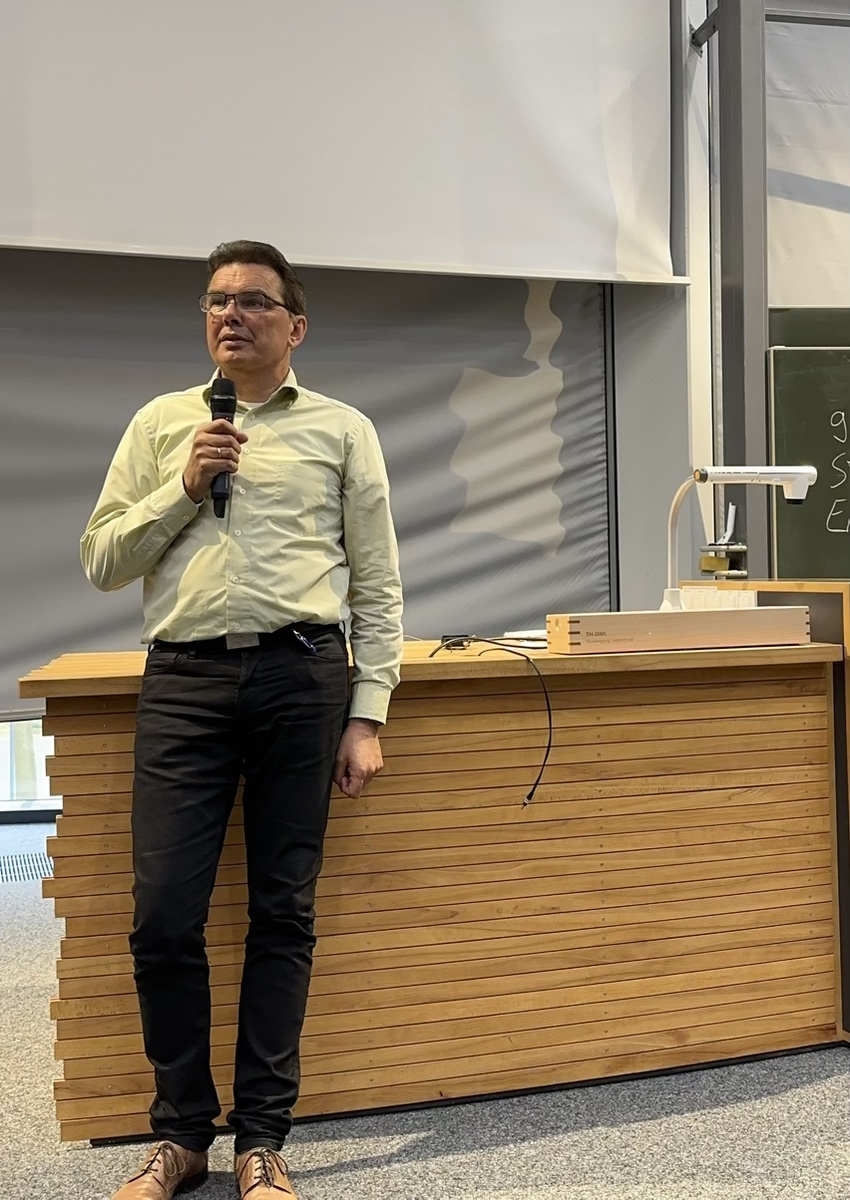
- Prof. Jasperneite in the lecture hall of TH OWL University (2024)
- Born: 1964 (age 61–62); Nieheim, Germany
- Education: Otto-von-Guericke University Magdeburg, OWL University
- Scientific career
- Fields: Electrical engineering, computer science

Jürgen Jasperneite (born 1964 in Nieheim, Germany) is a German engineer and Professor for Computer networks at the OWL University (THOWL) in Lemgo, North Rhine-Westphalia. He is the founding director of the Fraunhofer IOSB-INA in Lemgo and a board member of the University Institute Industrial IT (inIT).

== Career ==
Jasperneite studied Electrical Engineering and Information Technology and obtained his PhD in 2002 from Otto-von-Guericke University Magdeburg under the supervision of Professor Peter Neumann. From 1988 to 1990 he worked as a R&D-Engineer at Robert Bosch GmbH in Berlin in the field of the emerging cellular radio standard GSM. From 1990 to 2005 he was with Phoenix Contact GmbH in different positions, starting as an ASIC designer for industrial communication systems and finally as the R&D head of the business unit Automation Systems. Since September 2005 he is a Full Professor for Computer Networks in the faculty of Electrical Engineering and Computer Science at THOWL in Lemgo, Germany. End of 2006 he founded together with 6 other professors the Institute for Industrial Information Technology (inIT)as the first Institute of the THOWL, which he headed until 2017. 2009 he founded and headed the Fraunhofer IOSB-INA, which was expanded to the first Fraunhofer Application Center between 2012 and 2016 with financial support of the state NRW. Jasperneite is the co-founder of the Centrum Industrial IT (CIIT), which is Germans first Science-to-Business Center in the field of industrial automation technologies. For research, demonstration and transfer of Cyber-physical systems into production systems he initiated the SmartFactoryOWL. In 2018 he founded "Lemgo Digital", a new IoT Living Lab to empower small and medium-sized cities in Germany.

== Research focuses ==
The current research focuses of Jasperneite are:

- Industrial Communication Systems
- Automation and Information Technologies for Intelligent technical systems,
- Intelligent Networking for Cyber-physical systems and
- Distributed Real-time Systems.

== Further Functions ==
Jasperneite is engaged in the Industrie 4.0 Platform, VDI/VDE association for measurements and control technology, Germanys Leading Edge Technology Cluster "Intelligent Technical Systems OstwestfalenLippe it's OWL" and in the Institute of Electrical and Electronics Engineers (IEEE).
