= Detmold =

- Town
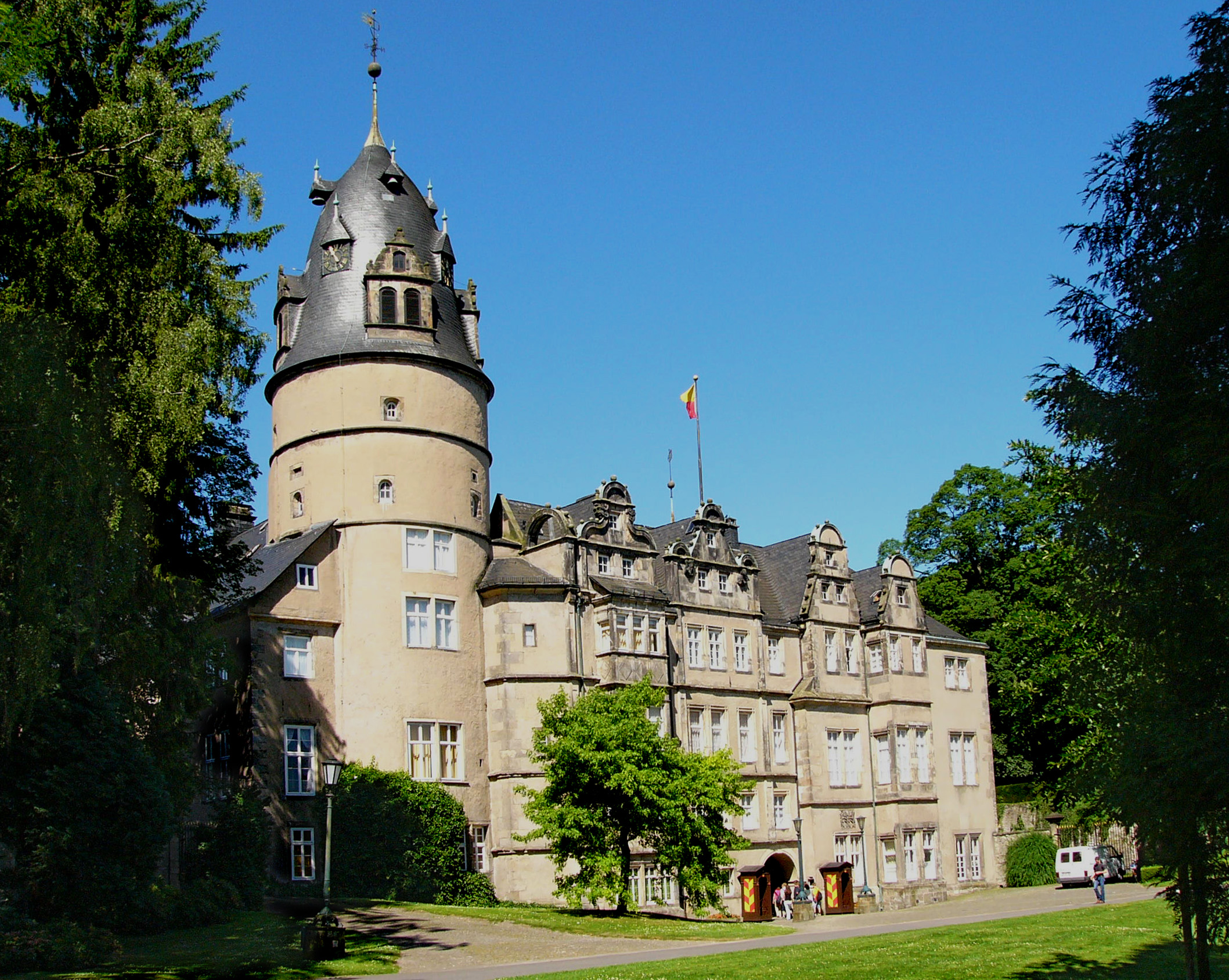
- The princely castle

- Flag Coat of arms
- Interactive map of Detmold
- Location within Germany Location within North Rhine-Westphalia
- Coordinates: 51°56′16″N 08°53′00″E
- Country: Germany
- State: North Rhine-Westphalia
- Admin. region: Detmold
- District: Lippe
- Subdivisions: 27

Government
  - Mayor (2025–30): Frank Hilker (SPD)

Area
  - Total: 129.39 km^{2} (49.96 sq mi)
- Elevation: 134 m (440 ft)

Population (2025-12-31)
  - Total: 74,438
  - Density: 575.30/km^{2} (1,490.0/sq mi)
- Time zone: UTC+01:00 (CET)
  - Summer (DST): UTC+02:00 (CEST)
- Postal codes: 32701–32760
- Dialling codes: 05231, 05232
- Vehicle registration: LIP
- Website: www.detmold.de

Detmold (German pronunciation: [ˈdɛtmɔlt]) is a city in North Rhine-Westphalia, Germany, with a population of 74,438. It was the capital of the small Principality of Lippe from 1468 until 1918 and then of the Free State of Lippe until 1947. Today it is the administrative center of the district of Lippe and of the Regierungsbezirk Detmold. The Church of Lippe has its central administration located in Detmold. The Reformed Redeemer Church is the preaching venue of the state superintendent of the Lippe church.

== History ==
=== Iron Age ===
About 5 kilometres (3 mi) to the southwest of Detmold is the Grotenburg hill with a prehistoric circular rampart and the Hermann monument (German: Hermannsdenkmal). The monument commemorates the so-called Battle of the Teutoburg Forest, a battle in 9 AD which may or may not have been fought close to the present location of Detmold. In this encounter, Germanic tribes led by Hermann (Latin: Arminius) defeated Roman legions under the command of Publius Quinctilius Varus.

=== Middle Ages ===
Detmold was first mentioned as Theotmalli in 783, the year of a battle between the Saxons and Charlemagne's forces nearby. This was an event in the Saxon Wars. In 1005 a Tietmelli or Theotmalli region (Gau) is referred to in documents.

In 1263, Bernard III of Lippe fortified the settlement at the crossing of the trade route from Paderborn to Lemgo over the Werre River with stone walls and granted it a municipal charter. Its population was reported in 1305 as 305. Market rights granted in 1265 led to rapid economic development. Its defenses were greatly strengthened after severe damage had been inflicted on the town during the conflict with Soest in 1447. A major fire in 1547 destroyed more than 70 houses.

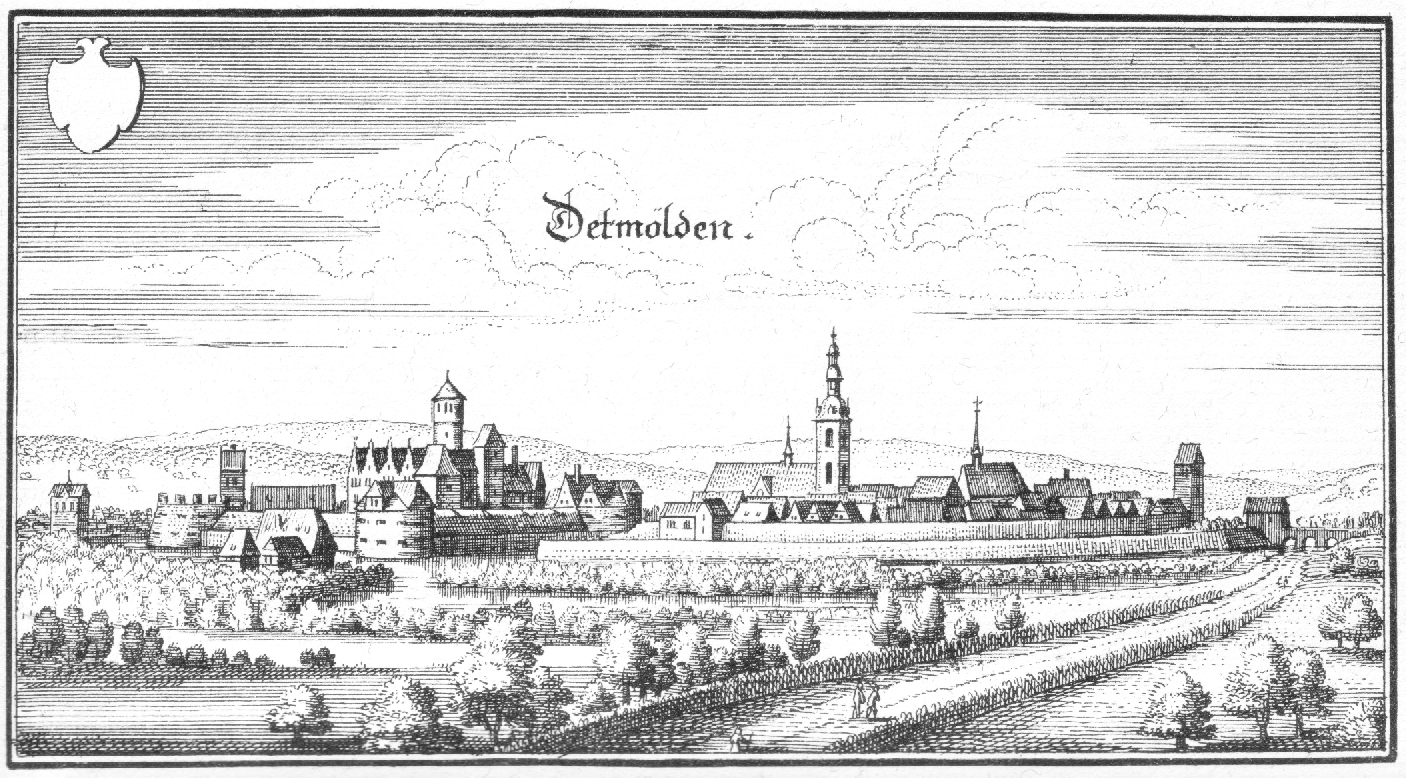
Engraving of a view of the town of Detmold by Matthäus Merian, 1647

In 1550, Detmold became the permanent residence of Count Simon III of Lippe. The counts were elevated to princes in 1789, and Detmold remained the capital of the small Principality of Lippe until the end of the World War I in 1918, when all princely states in Germany were abolished. Today, Stephan, Prince of Lippe is the owner of Detmold Castle.

=== Modern era ===
Street lighting was introduced in 1809, with oil-fired lanterns. By 1835, the town had become the most populous in Lippe, with over 4,000 residents. It grew to 12,000 in 1900 and over 30,000 in 1950.

From 1919 to 1947, Detmold was the capital of the Free State of Lippe. The Lippische Landes-Zeitung started in 1878 and, in co-operation with other regional papers, is still published today. The competing Lippische Tageszeitung was published in Detmold from 1896 until 1938. During the Nazi years (1933–1945), the Lippische Staatszeitung was the official party and government publication. When Lippe was incorporated into the new German state of North Rhine-Westphalia, the town became the seat of the Lippe district, and since 1972 it has been the seat of the district administration of Lippe. With the administrative reform of 1970, 25 nearby villages were incorporated into the city.

The former Hobart Barracks is nearby.

== Population ==
Historical population

Year	Pop.	±% p.a.
1965	61,943	—
1970	63,684	+0.56%
1975	65,635	+0.61%
1980	67,621	+0.60%
1985	66,396	−0.36%
1990	70,074	+1.08%
1995	73,343	+0.92%

Year	Pop.	±% p.a.
2000	73,695	+0.10%
2005	73,508	−0.05%
2010	72,758	−0.20%
2015	74,817	+0.56%
2020	74,097	−0.19%
2025	74,438	+0.09%

Source: Landesdatabank Nordrhein-Westfalen

== Main sights ==
- Adlerwarte Berlebeck (falconry)
- Donoper Teich (pond)
- Externsteine
- Fürstliches Residenzschloß, a Renaissance castle in the center of the town park
- Hasselbachteich (pond)
- Hermannsdenkmal (Arminius monument)
- Hochschule für Musik Detmold (Music Academy of Detmold)
- Technische Hochschule OWL (OWL=Ostwestfalen-Lippe)
- Landestheater Detmold, Detmolder Sommertheater
- Lippisches Landesmuseum (museum)
- LWL-Freilichtmuseum Detmold (Detmold open-air museum)
- Martin Luther Church (Detmold)
- Vogelpark Heiligenkirchen (bird sanctuary)
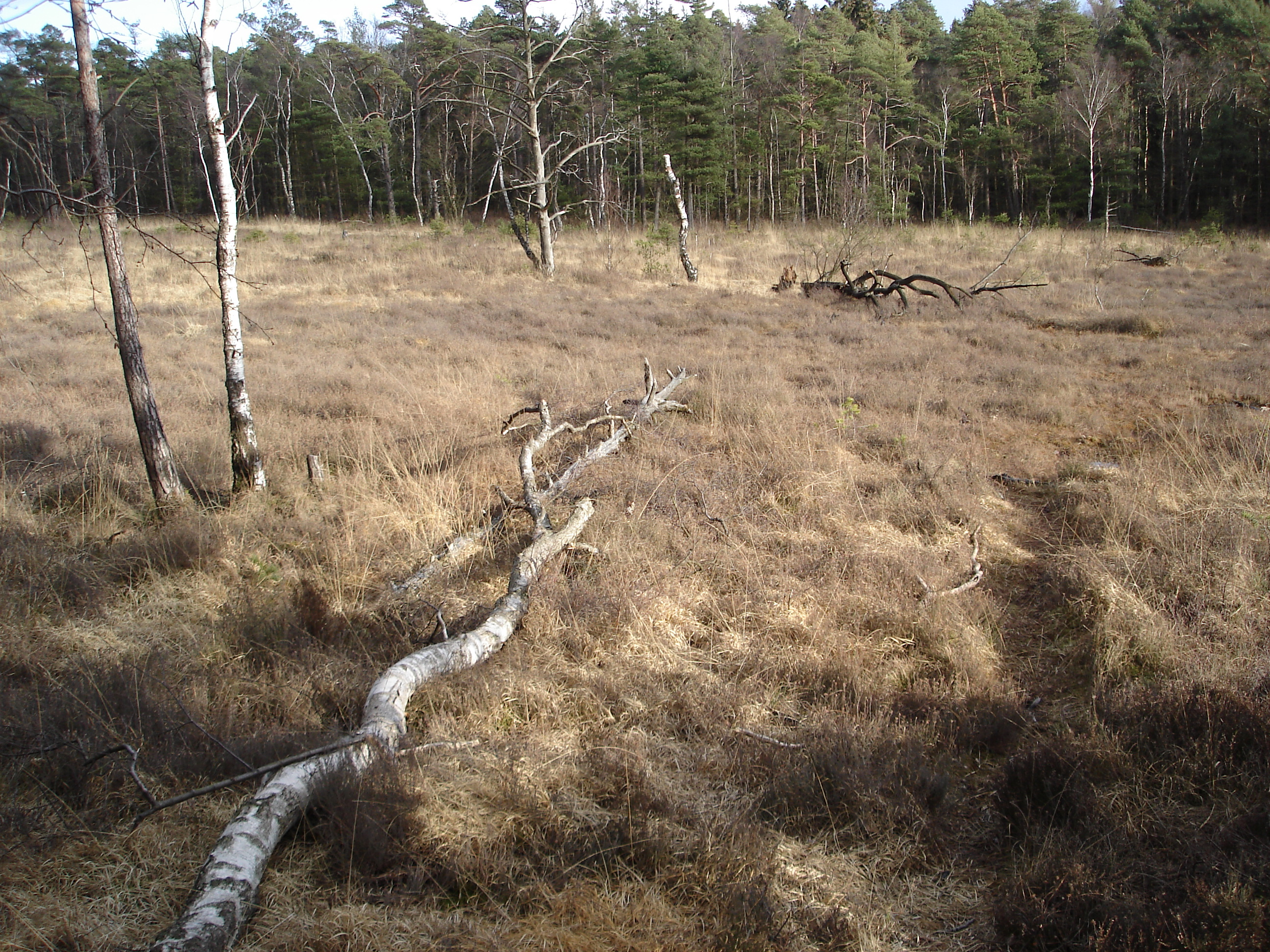
Hiddeser Bent, moor near Donoper Teich

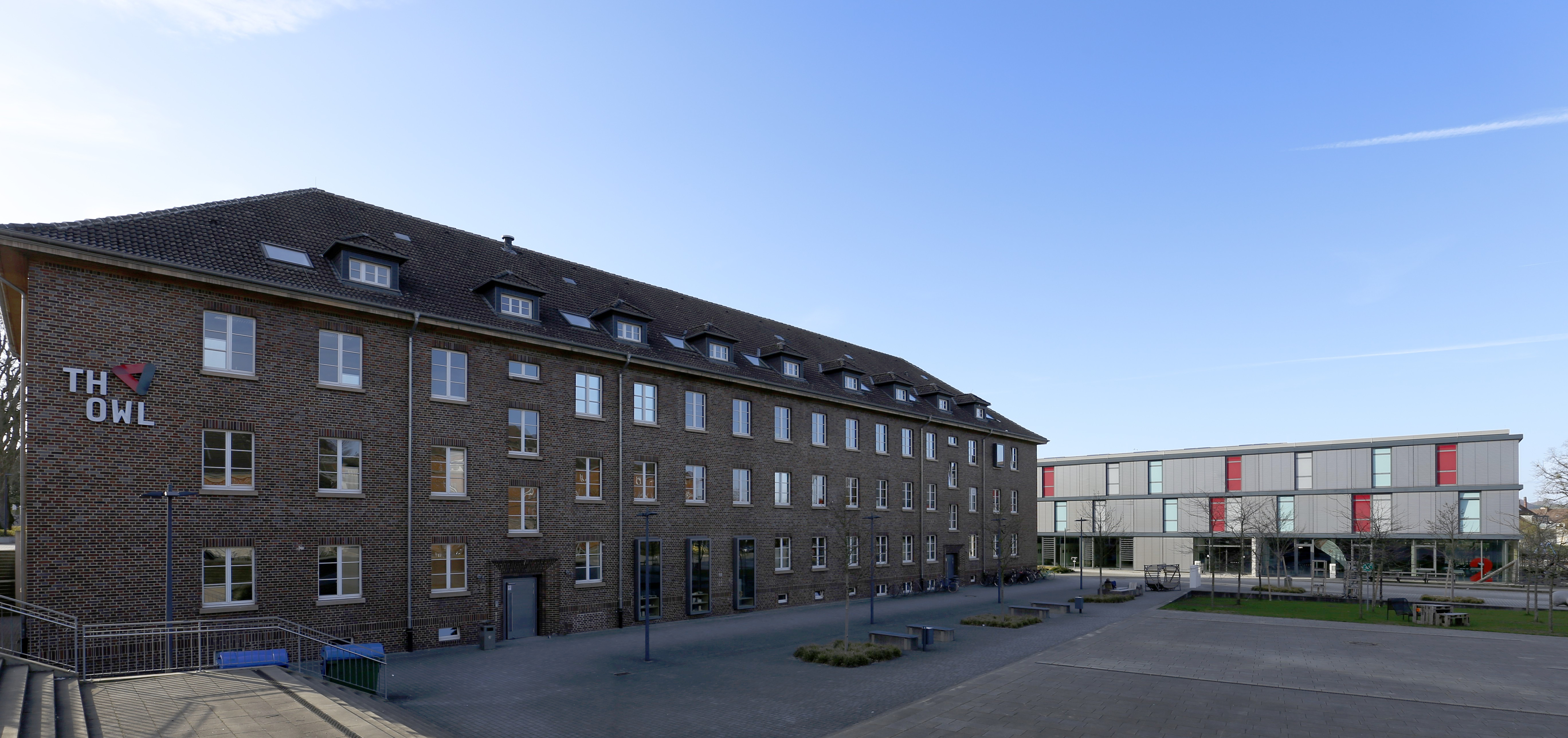
Campus of the Technische Hochschule OWL (2019)

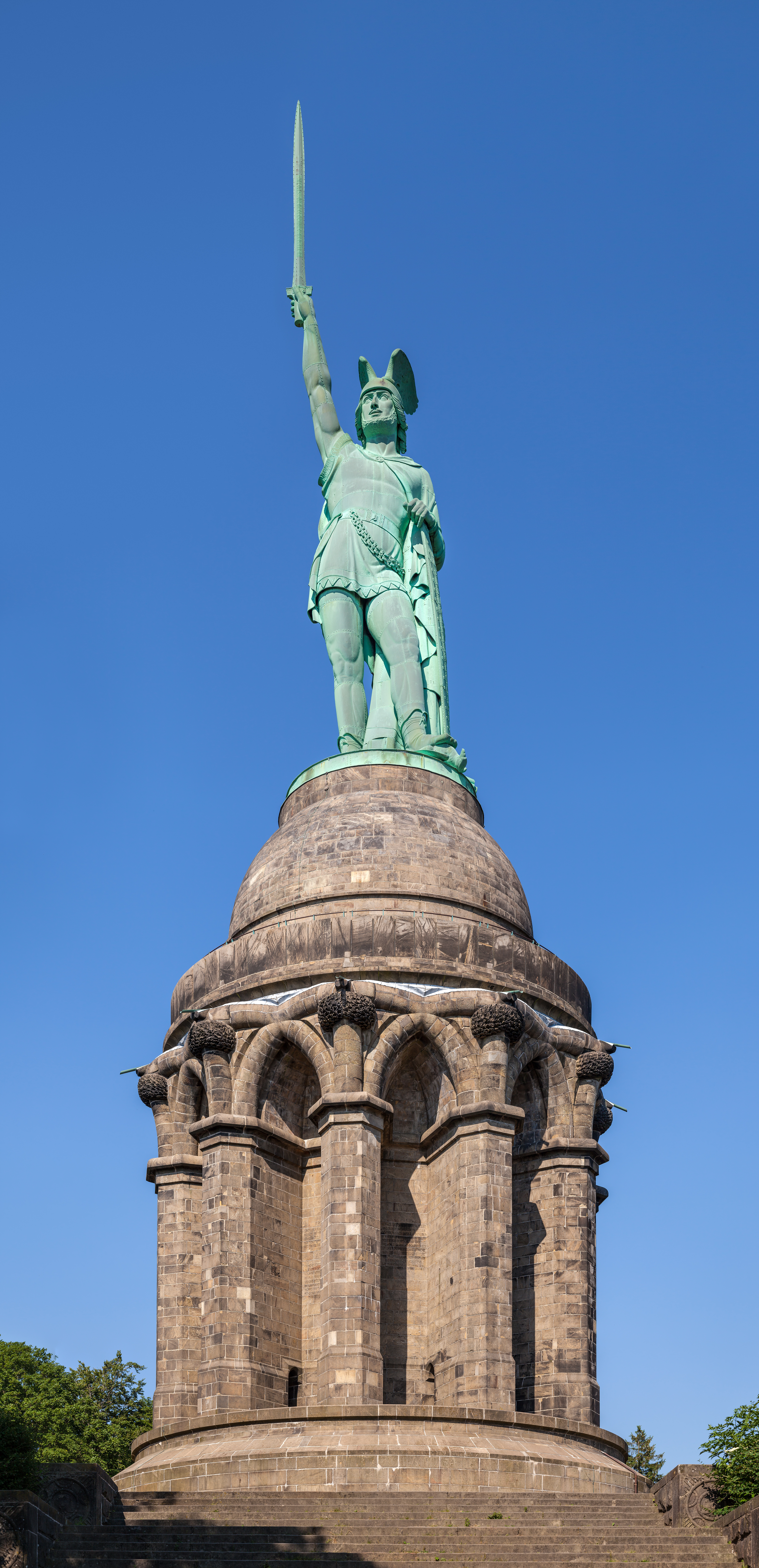
Hermannsdenkmal

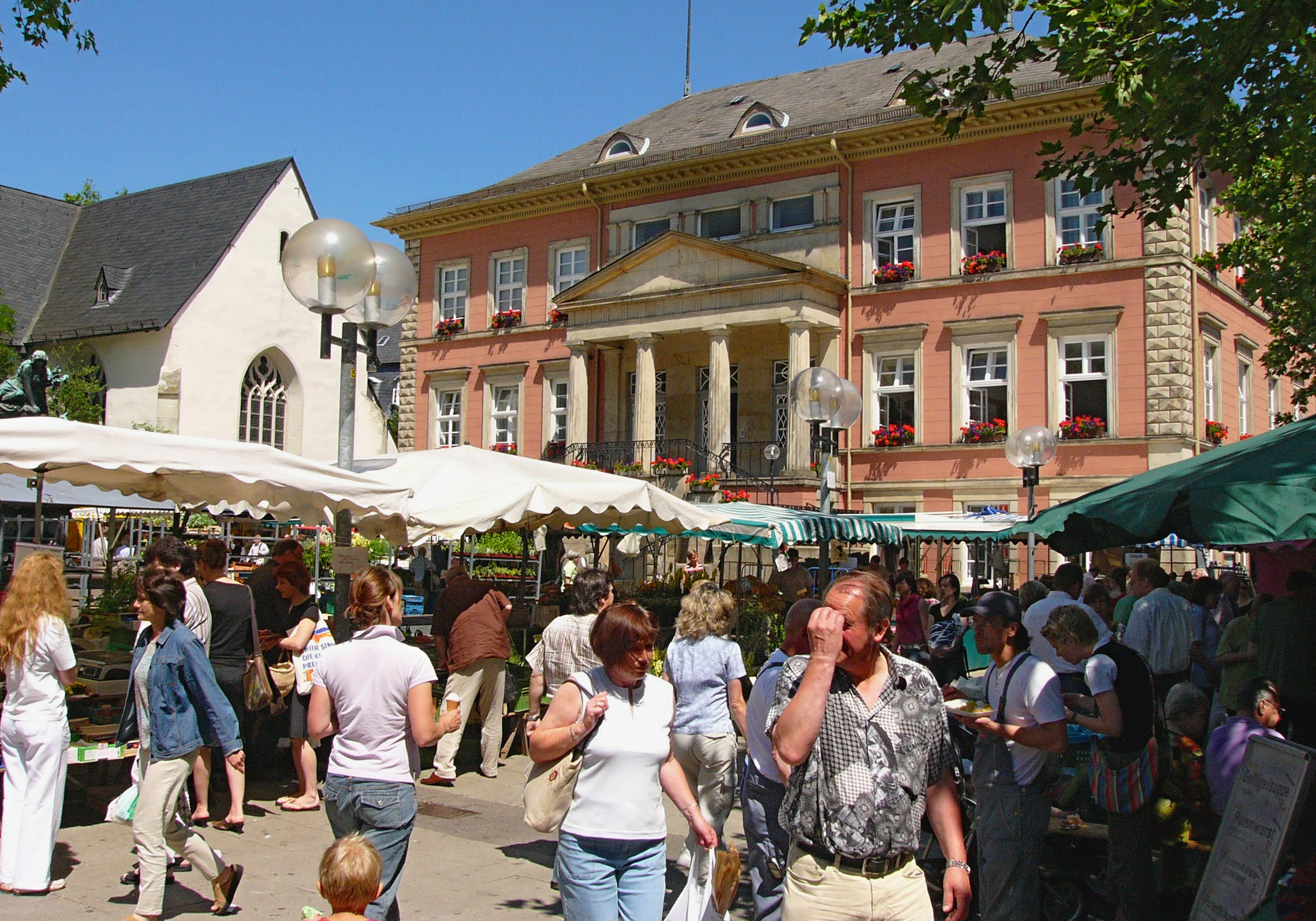
Market and town hall

== Culture ==
The highlights in Detmold are the school for music and the Landestheater Detmold.

The town also supports the Nordwestdeutsche Philharmonie for regular symphony concerts.

== Transport ==
There is no airport in the city. The nearest airports are:

- Paderborn Lippstadt Airport, located 35 km (22 mi) south west.
- Münster Osnabrück International Airport, located 116 km (72 mi) north west.
- Hannover Airport, located 116 km (72 mi) north east.
- Düsseldorf Airport, located 194 km (121 mi) south west.

== Schools ==
- Gymnasium Leopoldinum, founded 1602
- Stadtgymnasium Detmold, founded 1830
- Christian-Dietrich-Grabbe-Gymnasium, founded 1925

== Twin towns – sister cities ==
Detmold is twinned with:

- Hasselt, Belgium
- Saint-Omer, France
- Savonlinna, Finland
- Zeitz, Germany
- Oraiokastro, Greece

== Notable people ==
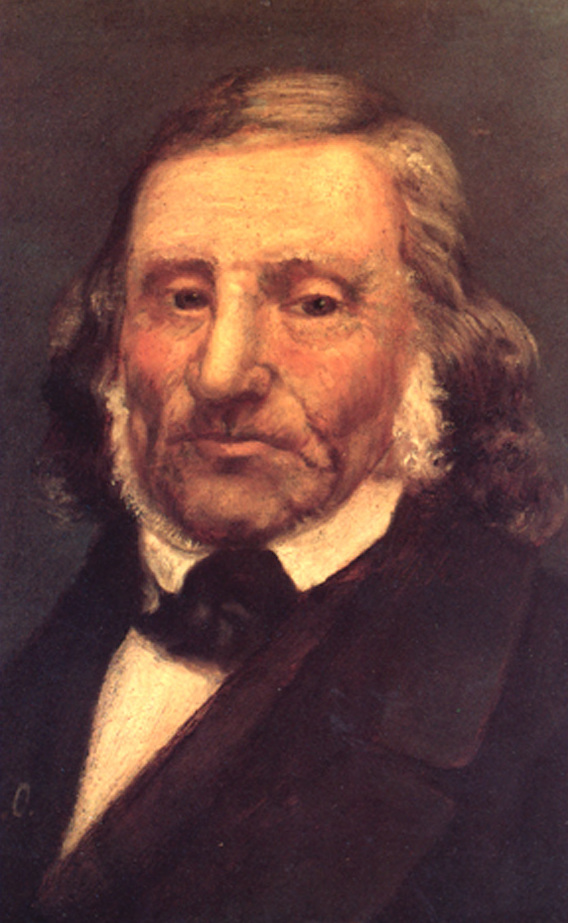
Leopold Zunz

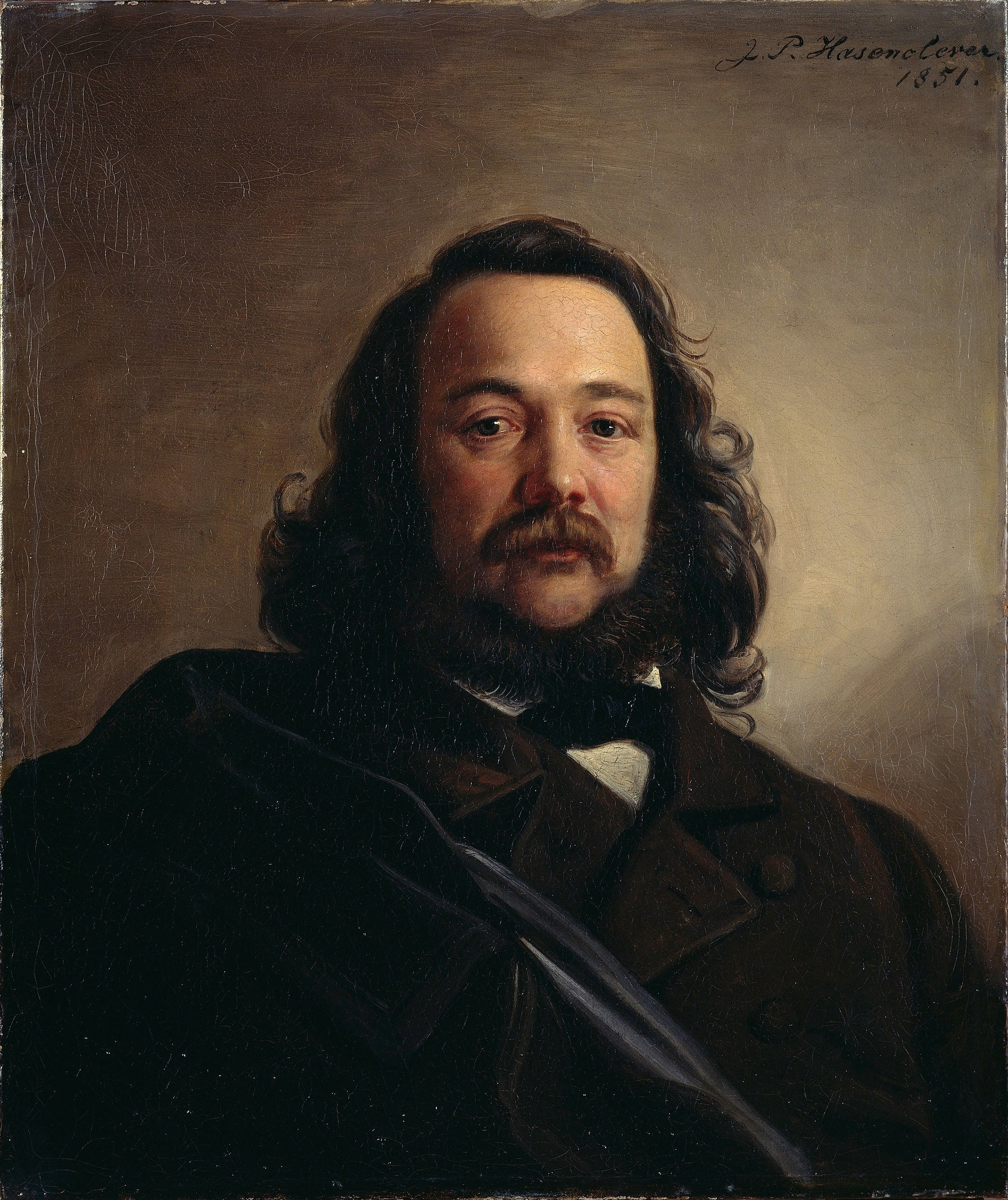
Ferdinand Freiligrath, 1851

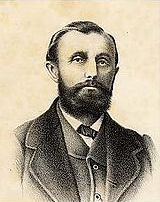
Gustav Wallis, 1879

Notable people born in Detmold include:

- Friedrich Adolph Lampe (1683–1729), theologian
- Simon August, Count of Lippe-Detmold (1727–1782), Count of Lippe
- Leopold I, Prince of Lippe (1767–1802), Prince of Lippe
- Leopold Zunz (1794–1886), scientist, founder of Reform Judaism.
- Leopold II, Prince of Lippe (1796–1851), Prince of Lippe
- Christian Dietrich Grabbe (1801–1836), alongside Georg Büchner the most important innovator of German-language drama in his time.
- Ferdinand Freiligrath (1810–1876), poet and author
- Leopold III, Prince of Lippe (1821–1875), Prince of Lippe
- Ferdinand Weerth (1774–1836), Pastor and School Reformer
- Georg Weerth (1822–1856), writer and poet.
- Gustav Wallis (1830–1878), botanist and South American traveler
- Joseph Plaut (1879–1966), actor, spieler, elocutionist, singer and regional poet
- Jürgen Stroop (1895–1952), Nazi general of the SS, executed for war crimes
- Werner Buchholz (1922–2019), engineer, creator of the art word byte
- Manfred Fuhrmann (1925–2005), old philologist
- Hans-Ulrich Schmincke (born 1937), volcanologist
- Heinz Burt (1942–2000), British musician and member of The Tornados
- Hartmut Fladt (1945), musicologist
- Hans Ottomeyer (born 1946), art historian, for 11 years curator of the German Historical Museum in Berlin
- Iris Berben (born 1950), actress
- Peter Lampe (born 1954), theologian
- Detlef Grumbach (born 1955), journalist, journalist, author and publisher
- Frank-Walter Steinmeier (born 1956), foreign minister, Vice Chancellor, and current President of Germany
- Manfred Ostermann (born 1958), local politician (independent) and former Landrat of Soltau-Fallingbostel
- Andreas Voßkuhle (born 1963), jurist, president of the Bundesverfassungsgericht
- Ludger Beerbaum (born 1963), jumping rider
- Wotan Wilke Möhring (born 1967), actor
- Matthias Opdenhövel (born 1970), television presenter and journalist
- Sven Montgomery (born 1976), Swiss-American cyclist
- Vera Ludwig (born 1978), poet
- Dennis Maelzer (born 1980), politician
- Tujamo (born 1988), DJ and record producer
- Stefan Langemann (born 1990), footballer

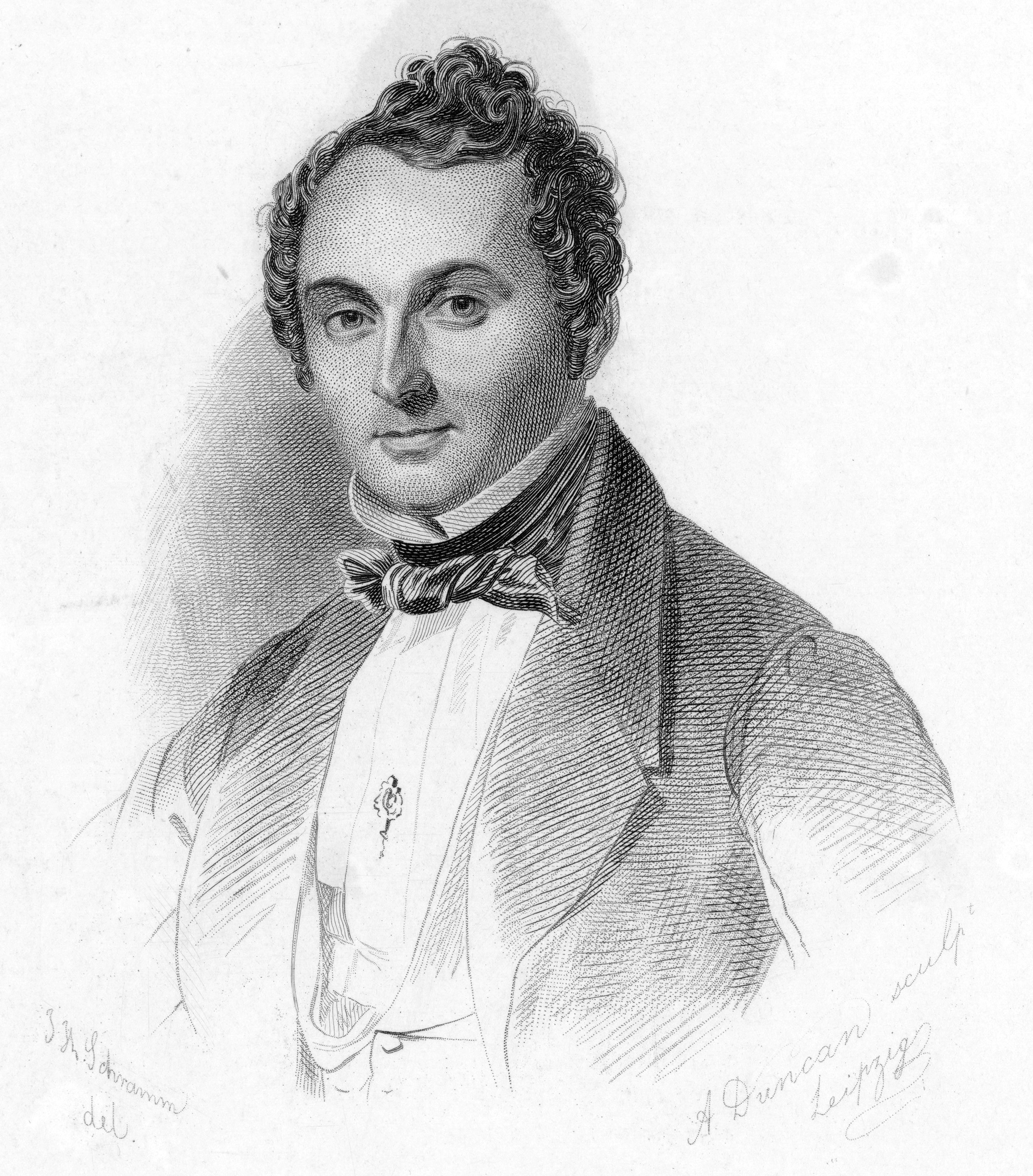
Albert Lortzing, 1835

Long-time residents of Detmold include:

- Albert Lortzing (1801–1851), composer.
- Johannes Brahms (1833–1897), composer, lived in Detmold in the winters of 1857–60
- Heinrich Drake (1881–1970), politician
- Felix Fechenbach (1894–1933), journalist
- Florian Reike, entrepreneur
- Giselher Klebe (1925–2009), composer
- Thomas Quasthoff (born 1959), bass-baritone
- Suzanne Bernert, German-born Indian actress

Others:

- Detmold child, a child mummy about 6,500 years old, found in Peru, named after this city.

Amongst the honorary citizens of Detmold, besides politicians are scientists and artists who have served in Detmold. The best-known are the builder of the Hermannsdenkmal, Ernst von Bandel (1871), Reich Chancellor Otto von Bismarck (1895), and Reich President Paul von Hindenburg (1917).
