= Florian Reike =

German entrepreneur

- Born: Cologne
- Education: Martin-Luther-Universität Halle-Wittenberg
- Occupation: Head of Research at Advanced Blockchain AG

Florian Reike is a German entrepreneur who works with cryptocurrency. He is one of the co-founders of nakamo.to and head of research at the Advanced Blockchain AG.

== Life ==
Reike grew up in Detmold, Nordrhein-Westfalen. He studied economics at the Martin-Luther-Universität Halle-Wittenberg between 2015 and 2017, but dropped out without finishing his degree. Today he lives and works in Berlin and New York.

== Career ==
Reike started to invest in Bitcoin and other cryptocurrencies in 2013 when he was a student, donating blood and working in a fast food restaurant to earn money he could invest. At a meeting of the blockchain and cryptocurrency scene in Berlin he met Robert A. Küfner and moved into his shared apartment. With the other flatmate Till Wendler they founded nakamo.to in 2017, a company with the aim to further develop Distributed Ledger Technology, which blockchain is based on. According to Reike, traditional blockchain technology has some shortcomings such as scalability, which led the founders of nakamo.to to focus on their new project peaq that is based on directed acyclic graphs (DAG). DAGs are a DLT System that for example the cryptocurrency IOTA is based on. Reike invested in IOTA as a student and when Robert Küfner first approached him in Berlin, Reike introduced him to IOTA. Since 2017, nakamoto.to is part of the Advanced Blockchain AG.

== Documentaries ==
- Die Bitcoin-Millionäre: Mit vollem Einsatz ins Risiko, Arte (broadcaster Der Spiegel), German documentary, 2017.
