= Detmold child =

Mummy found in Peru

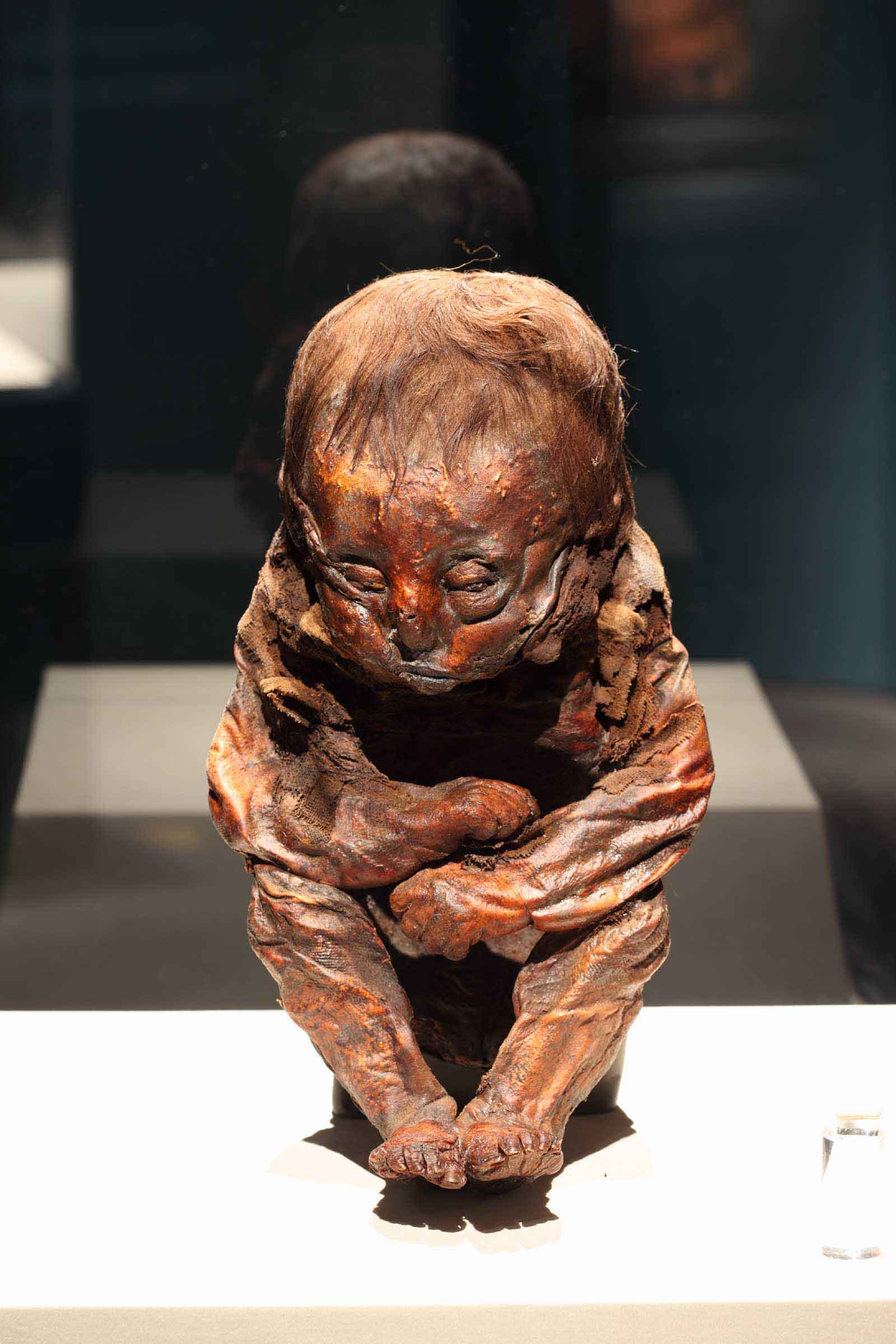
Detmold Child at the Mummies of the World Exhibition

Detmold child is the name of a mummy found in Peru. The mummy has been identified to be about 6,500 years old, making it one of the oldest preserved mummies ever found. It was named The Detmold child by its owners Lippisches Landesmuseum in Detmold, in North Rhine-Westphalia, Germany.

== History ==
Originally the mummy was owned by the Völkerkundliches Museum (Ethnological Museum) of the city of Witzenhausen. After an affection of mould was recognised on the mummy, it was donated to Lippisches Landesmuseum (Lippe State Museum) Detmold in 1987, where it was professionally conserved. In 2010 the mummy was examined in context of the German Mummy Project and the cultural historical importance of this object was realised.

== Physical characteristics ==
Officials at the Lippe State Museum in Detmold, Germany have revealed that the Detmold child died at the age of eight to nine months after suffering from a rare congenital heart malformation mostly known as hypoplastic left heart syndrome (HLHS), a condition with parts of the left side of the heart not developing completely. The syndrome combined with contracting pneumonia had led to the baby's death. The child was also discovered to have Vitamin D deficiency, and also had an abnormal, conically-shaped skull. The body had been covered by linen and buried with an amulet hung around its neck a CT scan has revealed.

The Detmold child was on exhibition at the California Science Center in Los Angeles, California in 2010 along with 45 other mummies and 95 various artifacts.
