= Stefan Langemann =

German footballer

Personal information
- Date of birth: 11 July 1990 (age 36)
- Place of birth: Detmold, Germany
- Height: 1.90 m (6 ft 3 in)
- Position: Midfielder

Team information
- Current team: Preußen Espelkamp
- Number: 7

Youth career
- SV Eidinghausen-Werste
- VfL Bückeburg
- –2009: RW Rehme

Senior career*
Years	Team	Apps	(Gls)
2009–2010	FC Bad Oeynhausen		
2010	Sportfreunde Lotte	1	(0)
2010–2011	SC Herford	24	(21)
2011–2013	Arminia Bielefeld II	37	(14)
2011–2014	Arminia Bielefeld	4	(0)
2013–2014	→ SC Wiedenbrück (loan)	10	(0)
2014–2015	Arminia Bielefeld II	17	(5)
2015–2018	SV Rödinghausen	81	(12)
2018–2019	SC Verl	18	(1)
2019–	Preußen Espelkamp	30	(30)
- * Club domestic league appearances and goals as of 25 January 2021

Stefan Langemann (born 11 July 1990) is a German former footballer who played as a midfielder. Early in his career, he was a striker, scoring 21 goals in 24 appearances for SC Herford. In 2019, he joined FC Preußen Espelkamp.
