= Dennis Maelzer =

German politician (born 1980)

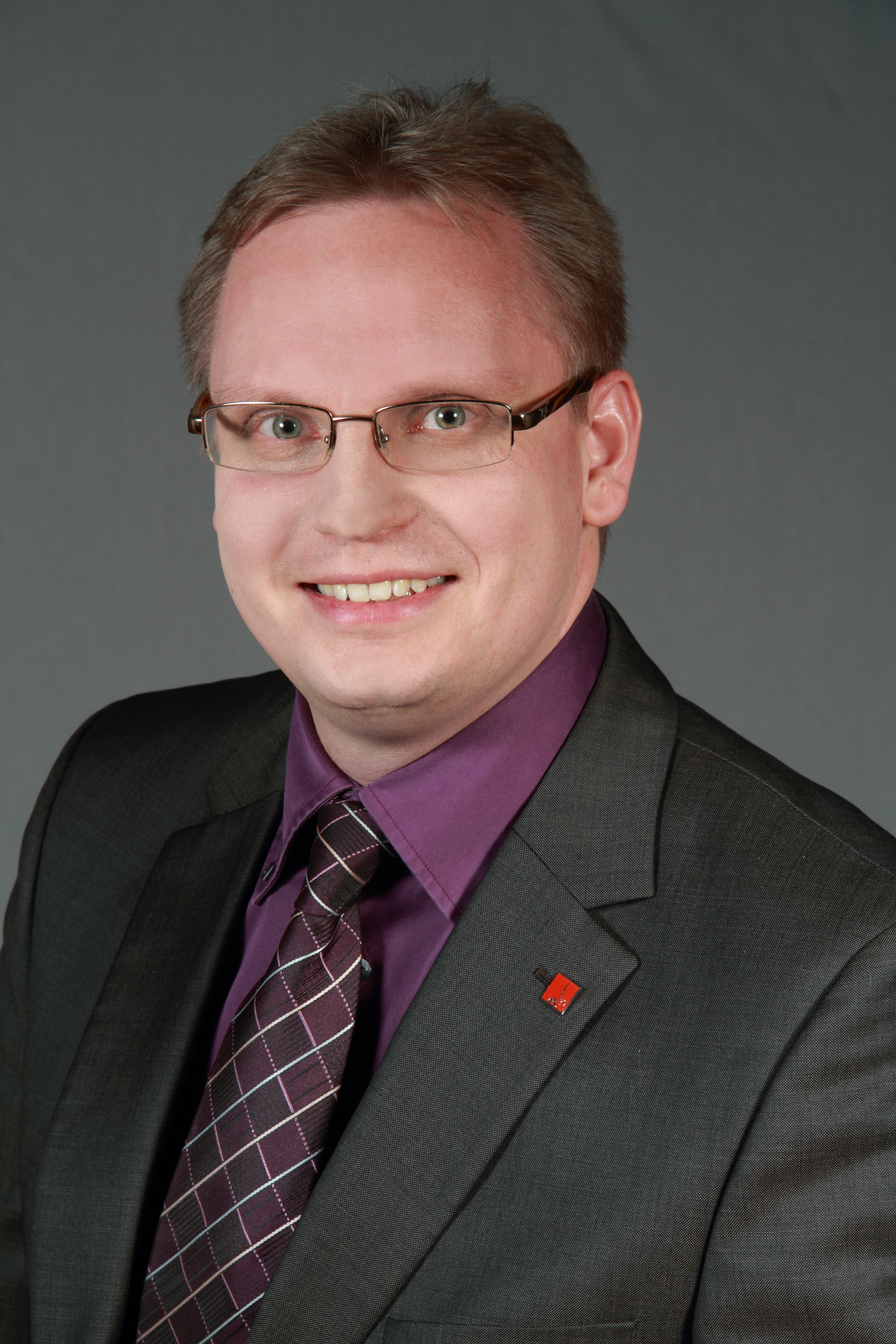
- Maelzer in 2013

Member of the Landtag of North Rhine-Westphalia
- Incumbent
- Assumed office 9 June 2010

Personal details
- Born: 28 February 1980 (age 46) Detmold
- Party: Social Democratic Party (since 1999)

Dennis Maelzer (born 28 February 1980 in Detmold) is a German politician serving as a member of the Landtag of North Rhine-Westphalia since 2010. From 1999 to 2000, he served as chairman of Jusos in Detmold.
