= Detmolder Sommertheater =

German theater

Coordinates: 51°55′44″N 8°52′24″E

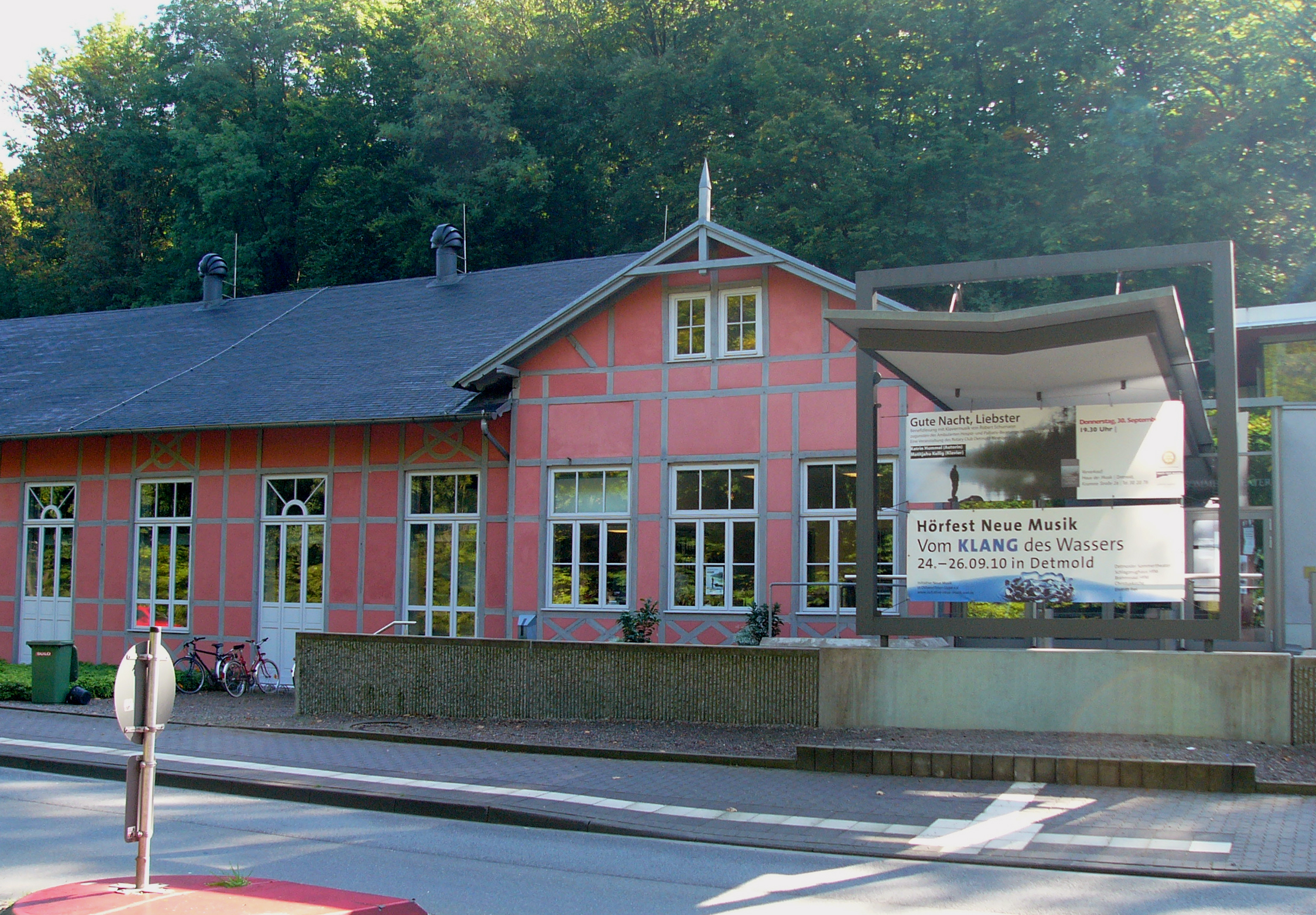
An image of Detmolder Sommertheater

Detmolder Sommertheater is a theatre in Detmold, North Rhine-Westphalia, Germany. It opened on 26 July 1896.
