= Ferdinand Weerth =

German pastor and school-reformer

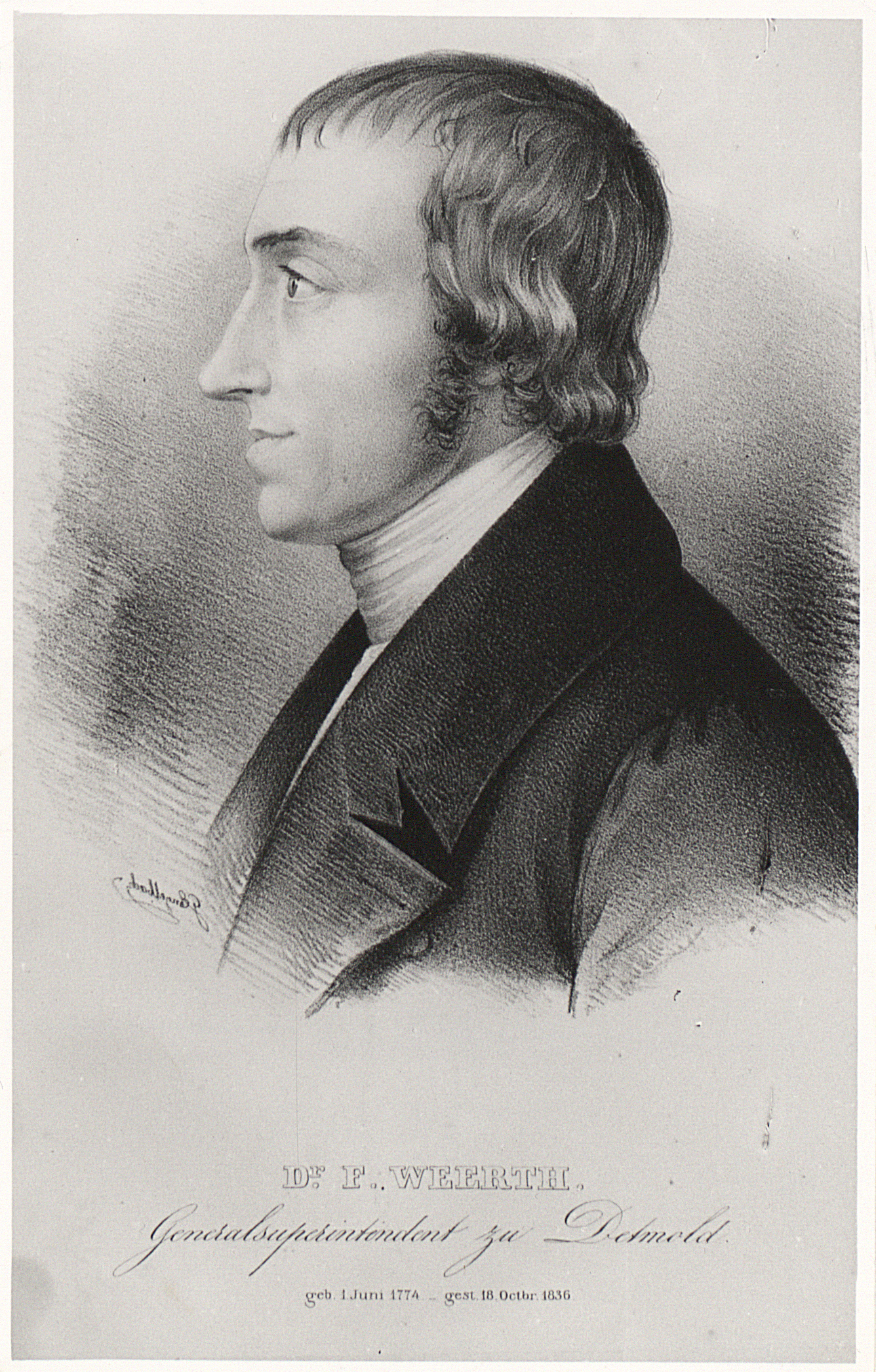
Ferdinand Weerth

Ferdinand Weerth (1 June 1774, Gemarke – 18 October 1836, Detmold) was a German pastor and school-reformer in the Principality of Lippe. Between 1805 and 1836 he officiated as the general superintendent (spiritual leader) of the Reformed Church of Lippe. One of his sons was the writer Georg Weerth.
