= Technische Hochschule OWL =

Tech university in Germany

TH OWL University of Applied Sciences and Arts
- Technische Hochschule Ostwestfalen-Lippe
- Type: Public
- Established: 1971
- President: Jürgen Krahl
- Administrative staff: 715
- Students: 5,672
- Location: Lemgo, Ostwestfalen-Lippe (OWL), NRW, Germany; 52°01′03″N 8°54′23″E
- Campus: Lemgo, Detmold, Höxter
- Website: th-owl.de

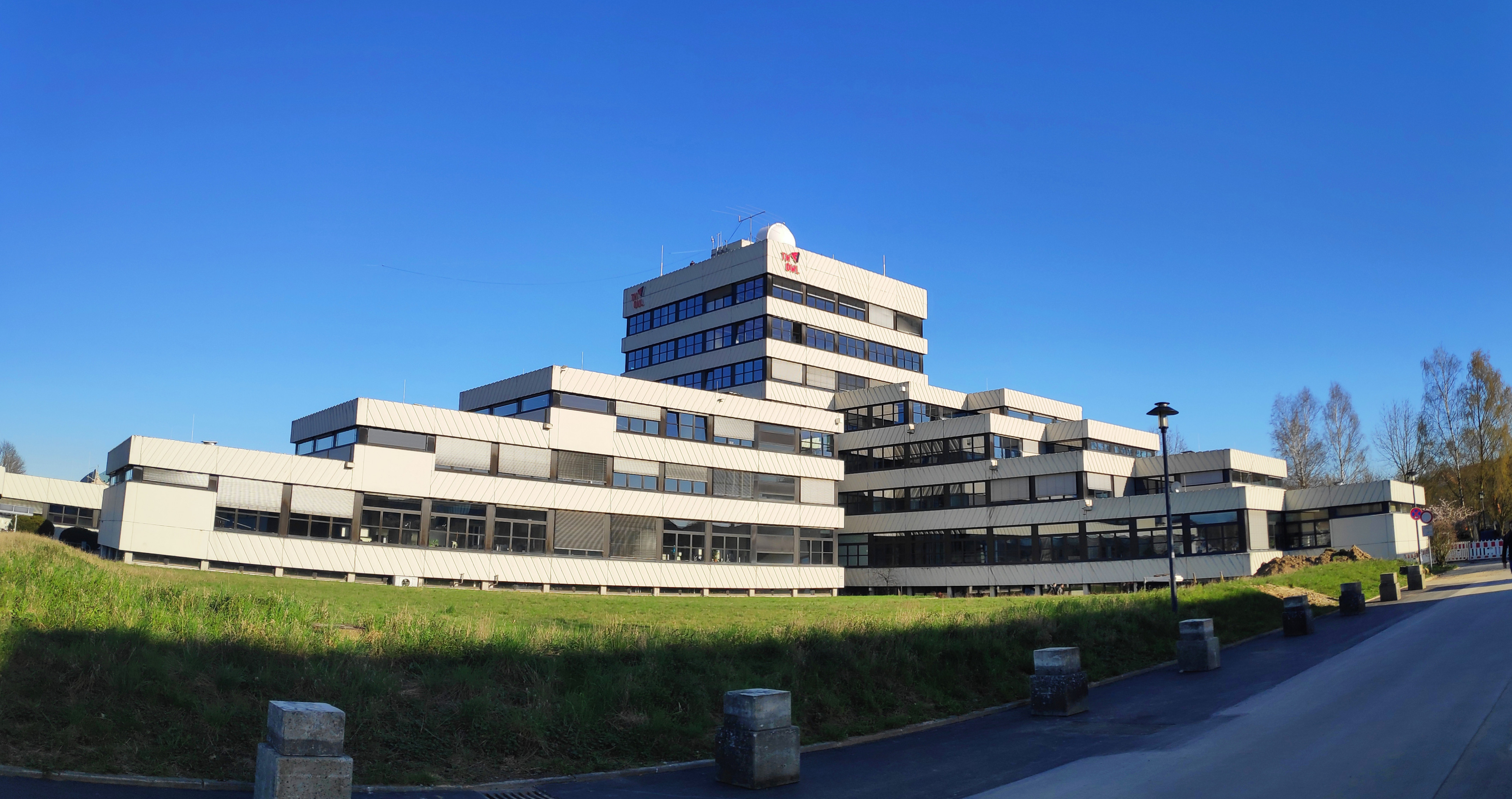
Main building of the TH OWL in Lemgo (2019)

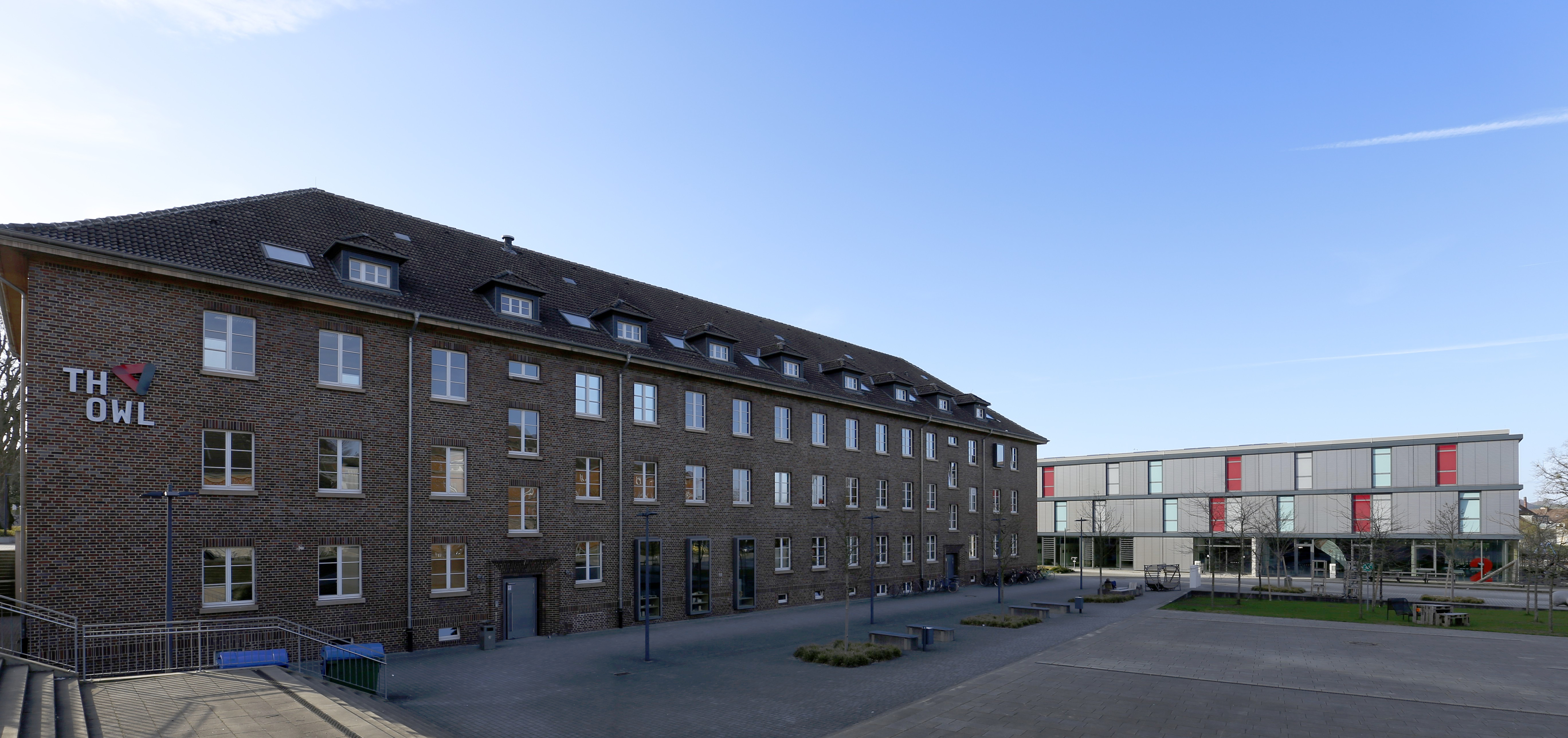
Campus at Detmold (2019)

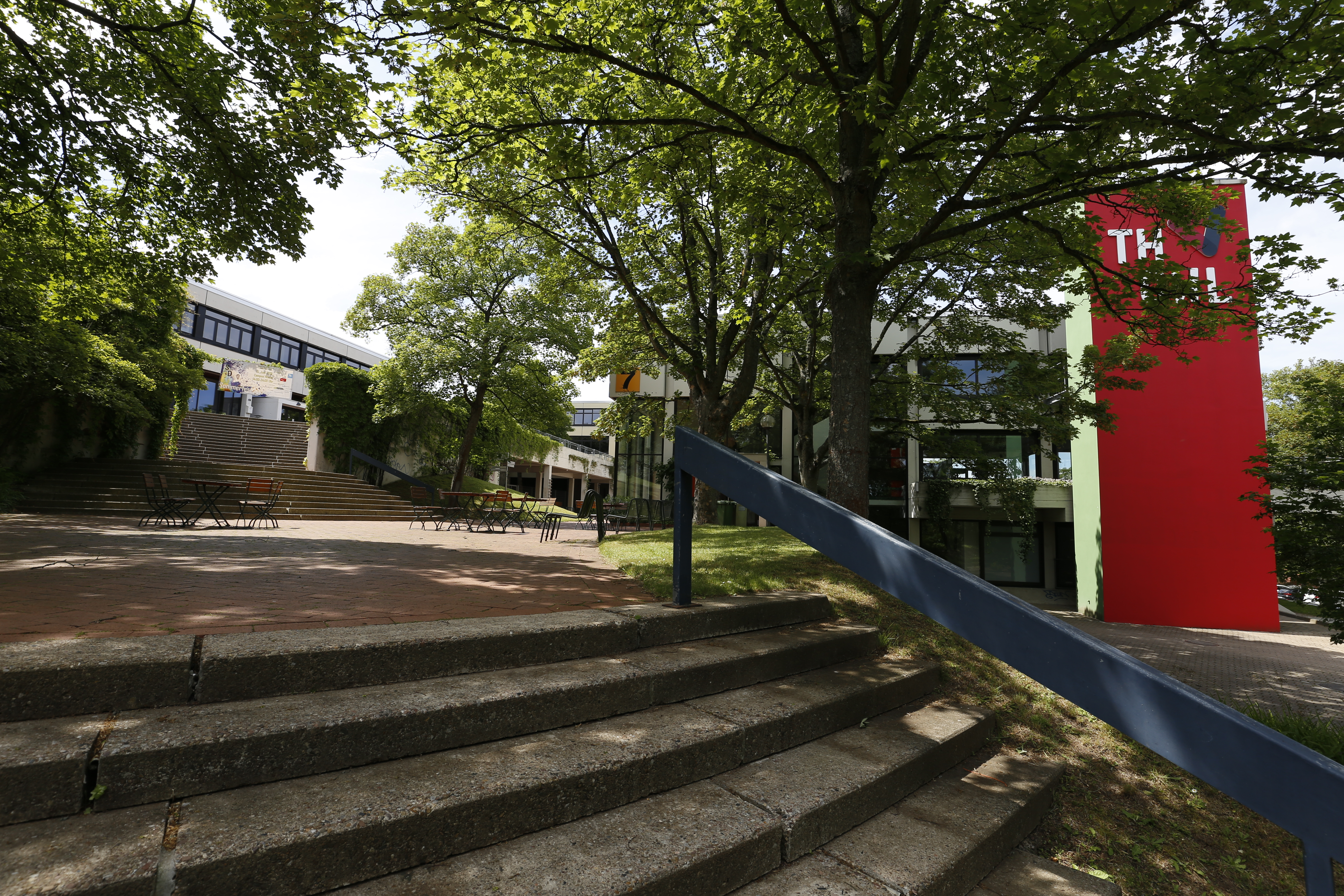
Campus at Höxter (2019)

The TH OWL University of Applied Sciences and Arts (German: Technische Hochschule Ostwestfalen-Lippe, abbreviated: TH OWL) is a state tech university in the Ostwestfalen-Lippe area in Lemgo, which is part of North Rhine-Westphalia. Additional campuses are in Detmold and Höxter. About 5,600 students work closely with 173 professors and about 550 other staff members in research, teaching and administration.

For several years, the university has been one of the ten most research-intensive universities of applied sciences in Germany. Due to its research performance, it was admitted to the European University Association in 2010.

== Locations ==
Historically, the locations have distinguished themselves as follows:

Lemgo is the main campus and home to the engineering disciplines of the THOWL. The faculites of "Agriculture, Food and Health", "Computer Science and Automation", "Production and Engineering" as well as "Economics" are located at the Innovation Campus Lemgo in the south of the town. Most of the study courses of one location as well as four research institutes of the university and a Fraunhofer Institute are located there.

Detmold is home to the "Detmold School of Design", "Media and Culture" and "Construction and Environment", and thus shows a focus on the creative industry. The departments are housed in the buildings of the former Emilia barracks (barracks III of the city). In addition to the old barracks buildings, another institute and laboratory building designed by professors, employees and students has been in existence since 2008.

In Höxter there are study programs of the faculties "Construction and Environment" and "Agriculture, Food and Health".

== History ==
Already in 1891 there was a Technikum in Lemgo, where one could study electrical engineering.

In the 1920s and 1930s, Lemgo had an engineering school as its successor, which was closed in 1938 because most students and lecturers switched to the German army. In the course of the establishment of new state engineering schools, the "State Engineering School for Mechanical Engineering Lemgo" started operations on October 1, 1964, with 36 students of mechanical engineering. This state engineering school was to replace the private engineering school Lage. The accommodation took place first in the Lindenhaus, and in the facilities at the Echternstraße. On October 1, 1965, the second department was set up, specializing in mechanical engineering and production technology. Today, it is the department 7 "Production and Economics", and on April 1, 1966, the third department is the department "Electrical Engineering", today the department 5 "Electrical Engineering and Computer Science".

In the course of the university reorganization in the state North Rhine-Westphalia, and the associated abolition of the universities as a whole, the Höxter department of the University of Paderborn became part of the Lippe University of Applied Sciences on January 1, 2002. Since then it has been called "Fachhochschule Lippe und Höxter" (FH LuH) and had three locations: Lemgo, Detmold and Höxter. In 2007, the Senate decided to rename the university "Hochschule Ostwestfalen-Lippe" with effect from 1 January 2008. This was justified by the breadth of the range of courses on offer, and the resulting fading specialisation, as well as the commitment to the region. In September 2018, it was announced that from April 2019 the OWL University of Applied Sciences would be known as the TH OWL.

== Research ==
Profile areas

At the TH OWL, research is carried out in various fields, but especially in the field of industrial automation technology and food safety. These two profile areas were funded as competence platforms by the state of NRW. From these competence platforms, the Institute for Industrial Information Technology (inIT for short) was established at the end of 2006, and the first research institute for food technology (ILT.NRW for short) in NRW at the beginning of 2011. The third institute, Future Energy - Institute for Energy Research at the university, was founded in 2017.

The Department of Electrical Engineering and Computer Science at the TH OWL is one of the strongest research faculties at German universities.

Due to third-party funds acquired, which are often based on cooperation with companies from the region, some professorships at the university have a large staff of research assistants.

Fraunhofer Institute

Fraunhofer IOSB-INA was founded at the Innovation Campus Lemgo at the beginning of October 2009. At the beginning of 2012, it was expanded into the first Fraunhofer Application Center in cooperation with a university of applied sciences in Germany. Following a successful evaluation, it was upgraded to the IOSB institute location for intelligent automation technologies in 2017.

== Technology and Knowledge transfer ==
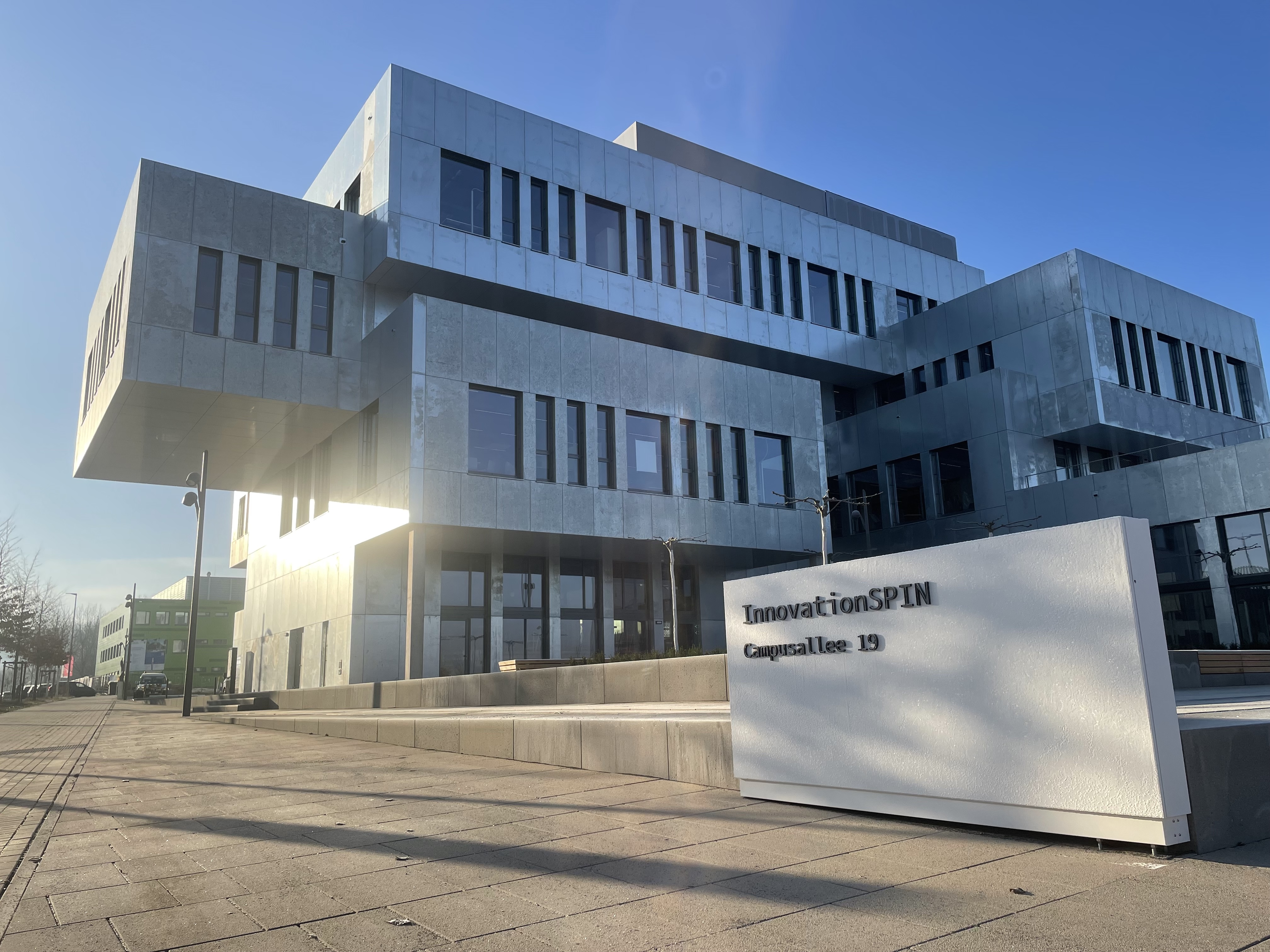
The new central place of the Innovation Campus Lemgo (December 2022)

Because of its location in the heart of the German Mittelstand and its research strength in the profile areas, the TH OWL sees itself as a partner of medium-sized businesses and society. Together with other actors from science and industry, special infrastructures for research and research-based technology and knowledge transfer have been created at the Innovation Campus in Lemgo in recent years.

Centrum Industrial IT (CIIT)

In 2010, the Centrum Industrial IT (CIIT) was established on the campus in Lemgo as part of a public-private partnership. As a registered association the CIIT is an independent research and transfer centre that aims to shape industrial automation technologies. More than 350 experts from companies and research institutions work under one roof. CIIT, together with the university institute inIT and the Fraunhofer IOSB-INA, forms one of the three regional centres of the leading edge technology cluster "Intelligent Technical Systems Ostwestfalen-Lippe (it's OWL)", which prevailed as the BMBF's excellence cluster in the third round of funding at the beginning of 2012.

SmartFactoryOWL

Together with the Fraunhofer IOSB-INA, the TH OWL is operating the SmartFactoryOWL research factory on Innovation Campus Lemgo since 2016. The aim of the facility is to establish a manufacturer-independent real-world production environment as a research and demonstration center in the area of Industry 4.0 and Work 4.0. At the same time a test field is realized.

IoT - Smart City Living lab Lemgo Digital

Fraunhofer IOSB-INA, in cooperation with the TH OWL and other partners, has been operating the living lab Lemgo Digital as a reference platform for the application of IoT technologies in medium-sized cities since the beginning of 2018. The inner city of Lemgo will be developed into a living lab for digitization. The goal is innovations for mobility, retail and the environment. The participation of citizens and other users in the entire innovation process is an important goal of this initiative, which is financially supported by the state of North Rhine-Westphalia.

SmartFoodTechnologyOWL

The successful development in the field of ICT-based automation is to be continued by bringing together industry 4.0 competencies, and food technology know-how from the university and partners. In 2016, the university became one of 10 universities of applied sciences in Germany with the strategy concept "SmartFoodTechnologyOWL".

Innovation Campus Lemgo

2016 with Innovation Campus Lemgo a new major regional urban development project[7] was announced. The aim is to create a new ecosystem for the digital economy in OWL that links existing and new players throughout the innovation chain education - research - economy. The two vocational colleges Lüttfeld and Hanse, the Fraunhofer IOSB-INA, the TH OWL, technology centres (such as SmartFactoryOWL) and innovation centres (such as Centrum Industrial IT) work closely together. With the Phoenix Contact Arena, a multifunctional event location is available on campus. Existing areas are to be upgraded, new places with a high quality of life are to be created and further research facilities and companies are to be established.

On the Innovation Campus Lemgo, the Landesverband Lippe offers more than 300 partially furnished apartments in several student residences. Starting in 2013, further student residences with more than 100 apartments have been privately built on the Innovation Campus Lemgo.

The Innovation Campus Lemgo can be reached by public transportation services via different bus lines or with the RB73 (Bielefeld-Lage-Lemgo) of the Eurobahn at the train stop Lemgo-Lüttfeld.

== Majors ==
TH OWL offers 32 Bachelor's, 20 Master's and 1 Doctoral degree programmes.

Study programmes by study location

The following abbreviations are used in the following:

- B = Bachelor's programme
- M = Master's programme
- D = Dual study programme
- P = Doctoral programme

Doctoral programme

- Graduate School for Applied Research in North Rhine-Westphalia (PK NRW) (P)

Campus Detmold

- Architecture (B) (D)
- Audiovisual Arts Computing (M)
- Civil Engineering (B) (D)
- Interior design (B) (D)
- Integrated Architectural Design (M)
- Integrated Design (M)
- Interior Architecture - Spatial Art (M)
- Media production (B)
- Sustainable construction and management (M)
- Urban development NRW (M)
- Urban planning (B)

Campus Höxter

- Applied Computer Science (B) (D)
- Chemistry (B - distance learning)
- Open space management (B)
- Landscape Architecture (B)(M)
- Landscaping and green space management (B) (D)
- Precision Farming (B)
- Environmental Engineering (B)(M)

Campus Lemgo

- Business Administration (B) (D)
- Computer Engineering (B) (D)
- Data Science (B)
- Digital Management Solutions (B)
- Electrical engineering (B) (D) (M)
- Wood technology (B)(D)
- Wood technology (M)
- Industrial Biotechnology (B)
- Industrial Food and Bioproduction (B), bilingual German-French course in cooperation with the University IUT Nancy-Brabois
- Information Technology (M), is conducted in English and in cooperation with Wroclaw University of Technology (PL), Ålborg University Centre (DK) and Halmstad University (SE). Also possible as an extra-occupational measure.
- Food technology (B) (D)
- Teaching profession at vocational colleges with the specialisations: Food Technology, Nutrition & Home Economics, Electrical Engineering, Mechanical Engineering, Mechatronics, Future Energies (B)
- Life Science Technologies (M)
- Logistics (B)(D)
- Management of medium-sized companies (M)
- Mechanical engineering (B) (D) (M)
- Mechatronics (B)(D)
- Mechatronic Systems (M)
- Medical and health technology (B)
- Pharmaceutical engineering (B) (D)
- Production Engineering & Management (M), English-language course of studies together with the University of Trieste with double-degree: German Master of Science, Italian Laurea Magistrale.
- Production and Management (M)
- Production engineering (B) (D)
- Smarth Health Science (M) (D)
- Technology of cosmetics and detergents (B) (D)
- Industrial Engineering (B) (D)
- Future Energies (B)

== PhD programme ==
Since 2022 Professors of the TH OWL, who are member of the Graduate School for Applied Research in North Rhine-Westphalia (PK NRW), are authorised to award doctorates.

Graduate Center.OWL

Since December 2015 there has been an interdisciplinary Graduate Centre at the TH OWL. It is a service facility that bundles the PhD projects carried out in research-strong departments. In addition, there are various offers for financial and content support as well as the possibility of networking internally and externally with other doctoral students - for example through series of events, further education measures and an annual graduate celebration.

== Rankings ==
The Electrical Engineering study programme at the TH OWL has already received several awards and is one of the best Bachelor's courses of its kind in Germany. In the 2010 CHE ranking, it was one of the most research-intensive courses of study in Germany and in the 2013/2014 CHE ranking one of the three best courses of study in Germany.

In the CHE Ranking 2015/2016, the bachelor study programme of Computer Engineering occupied top positions in six categories and bachelor study programme Applied Computer Science in two categories. In the CHE Ranking 2016/2017, the bachelor's degree programmes Electrical Engineering and Mechanical Engineering again occupy outstanding positions. The master's degree programs Information technology and Electrical Engineering have taken a top position nationwide in the 2022 CHE ranking for master's degree programs In the CHE Ranking 2024/2025, the bachelor study programme of Computer Engineering is in the top group in 16 of 18 categories and has the most research funding per professorship in Germany.

== Predecessor institutions ==
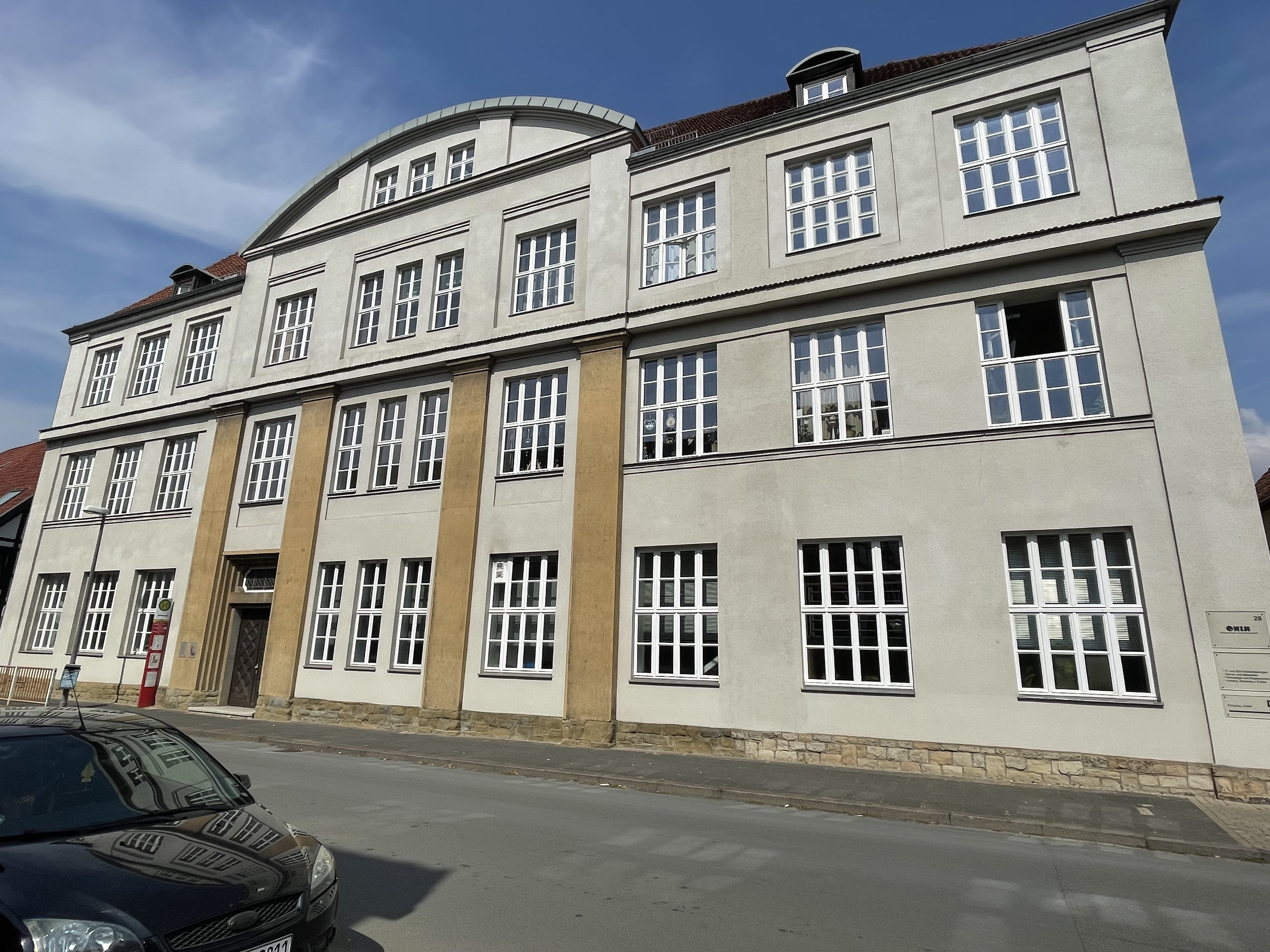
Technikum Lemgo is a forerunner of today's THOWL (2022).

- Höxter Building Trade School (founded in 1864)
- Technikum Lemgo (founded in 1891)
- Technikum Lage (founded 1911)
- Detmold School of Carpentry (founded in 1893 by master carpenter Ludwig Reineking as a day school; from 1921 under the direction of Friedrich Meyer development into a modern technical school; since 1954 technical school for woodworking technology and interior design; 1971 transfer of the interior design school to the "Architecture" department of the Lippe University of Applied Sciences)
- State Engineering school Lemgo (founded 1964)
- Lippe University of Applied Sciences (founded 1971)
- Lippe and Höxter University of Applied Sciences (2002, after merger of the University of Applied Sciences Lippe with the Höxter department of the University of Paderborn)
- TH-OWL, OWL University of Applied Sciences and Arts (renamed 2019)

== Rectors and Presidents of the present Technical University Ostwestfalen-Lippe ==
Name	from	to
Werner Rappaport	1971	1976
Karl Friedrich Saur	1976	1980
Wolfgang Zimmermann	1980	1984
Dietrich Lehmann	1984	2002
Tilmann Fischer	2002	2011
Oliver Herrmann	2011	2016
Jürgen Krahl	2016	

== University council ==
The University Council of the TH OWL currently consists of the following members:

- Antonia B. Kesel, Bremen University of Applied Sciences
- Klaus Böhme, Chairman of the Federal Department of Education, Science and Research at ver.di
- Andrea Frank, Head of the "Research, Transfer and Science Dialogue" programme area at the Stifterverband Bildung, Wissenschaft, Innovation (Education, Science, Innovation Donors' Association) and Managing Director of the Stiftung Bildung und Gesellschaft im Stifterverband (Education and Society Foundation within the Stifterverband)
- Ernst-Michael Hasse, Honorary President of the Chamber of Industry and Commerce Lippe zu Detmold
- Klaus Maas, Head of the Department of Environmental Information Systems at the Technical University OWL
- Claudia Schare, Member of the WDR Board of Directors
- Barbara Schwarze, Osnabrück University of Applied Sciences
- Ulrich Stiebel, Managing Director and Partial Owner of Stiebel Eltron

== International cooperation ==
The TH OWL maintains an international partner network with over 100 universities.

- University of Trieste, Italy
- Marmara University, Turkey
- İstanbul Teknik Üniversitesi, Turkey
- Halmstad University of Applied Sciences, Sweden
- Savonia University of Applied Sciences, Finland
- University of Novi Sad, Serbia
- (United States) University of Florida, USA
- (United States) North Dakota State University, USA
- University of Debrecen, Hungary
- Polytechnic University of Madrid, Spain
- Delft University of Technology, Netherlands
- Politecnico di Milano, Italy
- University of Venice, Italy
- Universidade de Lisboa, Portugal

== Tuition fees ==
As with many universities, tuition fees were introduced at the Ostwestfalen-Lippe Technical University in the 2006/2007 winter semester at a maximum rate of 500 euros. The student body submitted an application to the university's Senate to reduce contributions to 350 euros. On 2 December 2009, the Senate voted with 13 "Yes" votes, 7 "No" votes, and one abstention in favour of the proposal by the students; in the summer semester 2010, corresponding contributions of 350 euros were levied. In the winter semester 2011/2012, the state government of North Rhine-Westphalia abolished tuition fees.

== Student lead projects ==
In 2008 the OWL-Racing-Team was founded as Formula Student Team of the TH OWL in Lemgo. This team takes part in the international Formula SAE design competition, in which student teams from all over the world compete against each other in self-made racing cars.

Campus radio Triquency is broadcast terrestrially at all three locations. There is also an Internet stream. In addition, Dreist.tv is a student-run university station (IPTV).

On the Höxter site, a metrological station Campuswetter is operated, which makes it possible to teach the topic of metrology or process informatics with practical relevance. The data of the station are presented in real time on the Internet.
