= Bavarian cuisine =

Style of cooking in Germany

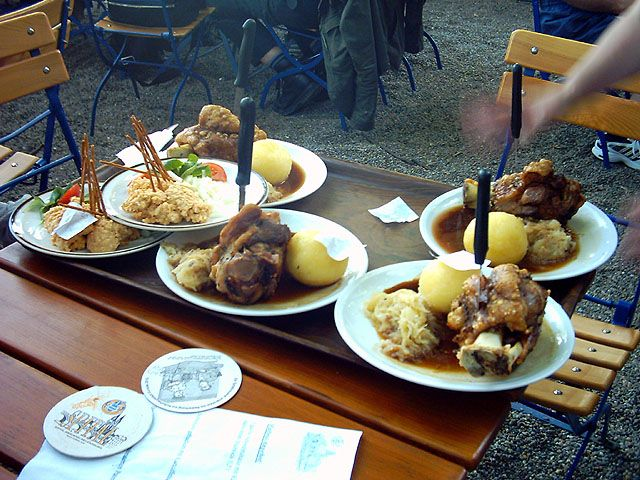
Schweinshaxn and Obatzda in a beer garden

Bavarian cuisine (Bavarian: Boarische Kuche; German: Bayerische Küche) is a style of cooking from Bavaria, Germany.

More than 285 typical Bavarian products have been recorded in the Bavarian specialities database 'GenussBayern' since the 1990s. Recipes and museums can also be found there. With a total of 54 specialities protected under European law, Bavaria is the No. 1 speciality region in Germany. Bavarian products such as ‘Bavarian beer’, ‘Nuremberg bratwurst’, ‘Allgäu mountain cheese’ and ‘Schrobenhausen asparagus’ are just as much a part of the official EU list 'eAmbrosia' of prestigious regional culinary specialities as the protected names “Champagne” and ‘Prosciutto di Parma’. Bavarian specialities, which are protected as geographical indications, are deeply rooted in their region of origin, important anchors of local identity and also tourist flagships - they are therefore at the heart of Bavarian cuisine.

Restaurants that carry the 'Ausgezeichnete GenussKüche' award (recognizable by a sign near the door) are known by locals for their certified, authentic Bavarian cuisine.

The Bavarian dukes, especially the Wittelsbach family, developed Bavarian cuisine and refined it to be presentable to the royal court. This cuisine has belonged to wealthy households, especially in cities, since the 19th century. The (old) Bavarian cuisine is closely connected to Czech cuisine and Austrian cuisine (especially from Tyrol and Salzburg), mainly through the families Wittelsbach and Habsburg. Already in the beginning, Bavarians were closely connected to their neighbours in Austria through linguistic, cultural and political similarities, which is also reflected in the cuisine.

== History ==
Cooking traditions of Bavarian cuisine date back to medieval times, where people brought different cuisines to Bavaria along with their conquerors, including Charlemagne.

Beer was known to have been brewed since the Bronze Age. The ancient Germans were probably the first Europeans to have brewed beer. According to the Reinheitsgebot of 1516, introduced by Wilhelm IV, Duke of Bavaria, the only ingredients used to make beer included barley, hops and water, and including yeast. An earthenware amphora, discovered in a Celtic chieftain's burial mound in Kasendorf dates back to 800 BCE and considers to be the oldest evidence of beer-making in Europe. Bavarian beer is nowadays a Protected Geographical Indication (PGI).

Nürnberger Bratwurst PGI (Nürnberger Bratwurst) was first mentioned in a document in 1313 when the council of Nuremberg described the recipe as a special product.

There is rumour which has it that noodles were brought to Bavaria by Marco Polo, after returning from his journey in China while the Romans were gone.

The Napoleonic Wars marked the time with the occupation of Bavaria, the French influenced everything in their own way of life, mainly Haute cuisine.

== Traditional dishes ==
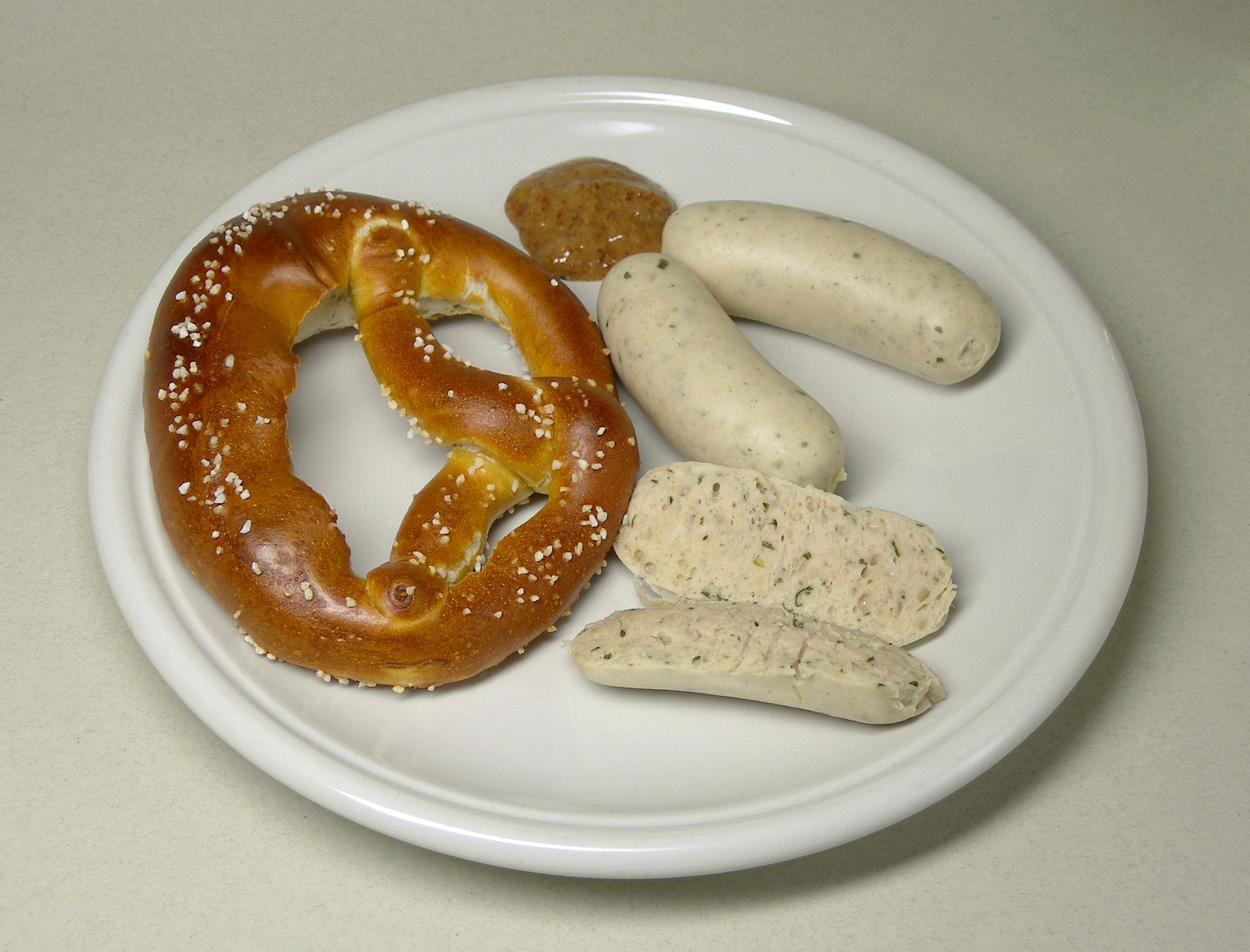
Münchner Weißwurst with a Brezel and sweet mustard

Regional cuisine in the various states of the German nation has received increasing attention since the late 19th century, particularly that of the larger cities. In cookbooks of that era termed "Bavarian" both domestic rural dishes and dishes inspired by French cuisine were published. The cookbooks concentrated on dishes based on flour and Knödel. For the regular people, even the people living in cities, meat was usually only reserved for Sundays.

The 19th century cookbooks included many recipes for soups containing Knödel. The meat recipes were mostly based on beef and veal, where cooked beef was used for everyday meals. In the case of pork, suckling pig played a great role. "The use of offal and the entire slaughtered animal - especially the calf - from head to toe was a special characteristic of the recipes collected in the Bavarian cookbooks. Udders, tripe, calf head, calf hoofs, etc. have changed from 'poor man's dishes' [...] to the prestigious 'Schmankerl' of the new Bavarian regional cuisine. [...] The prominence of head cheese, prepared both sweet and sour, seems to also be a speciality of Bavarian cuisine."

Knödel and noodles were a traditional festive dish in Bavaria. In the late 19th century, chopped pork with Knödel was a typical Bavarian regional dish. The Munich Weißwurst was "invented" only in 1857. There were few recipes for mixed vegetables in the cookbooks, and stews played hardly any role, but the Pichelsteiner stew is said to have been introduced in Eastern Bavaria in 1847. In the 19th century, the vegetables that most of the Bavarians usually ate were Sauerkraut and beets. French-influenced dishes included Ragouts, Fricassee and "Böfflamott" (Boeuf à la Mode), larded and marinated beef. This was mostly only reserved for the nobility, but was later also adopted into the cuisine of ordinary people.

A report from 1860 says: "A characteristic of the nurture of the Upper Bavarian rural people is the overall prominence of flour, milk and lard dishes with vegetables added and the diminished consumption of meat dishes on the five most important festive days of the year: Carnival, Easter, Pentecost, Kermesse and Christmas [...]".

=== Munich cuisine ===
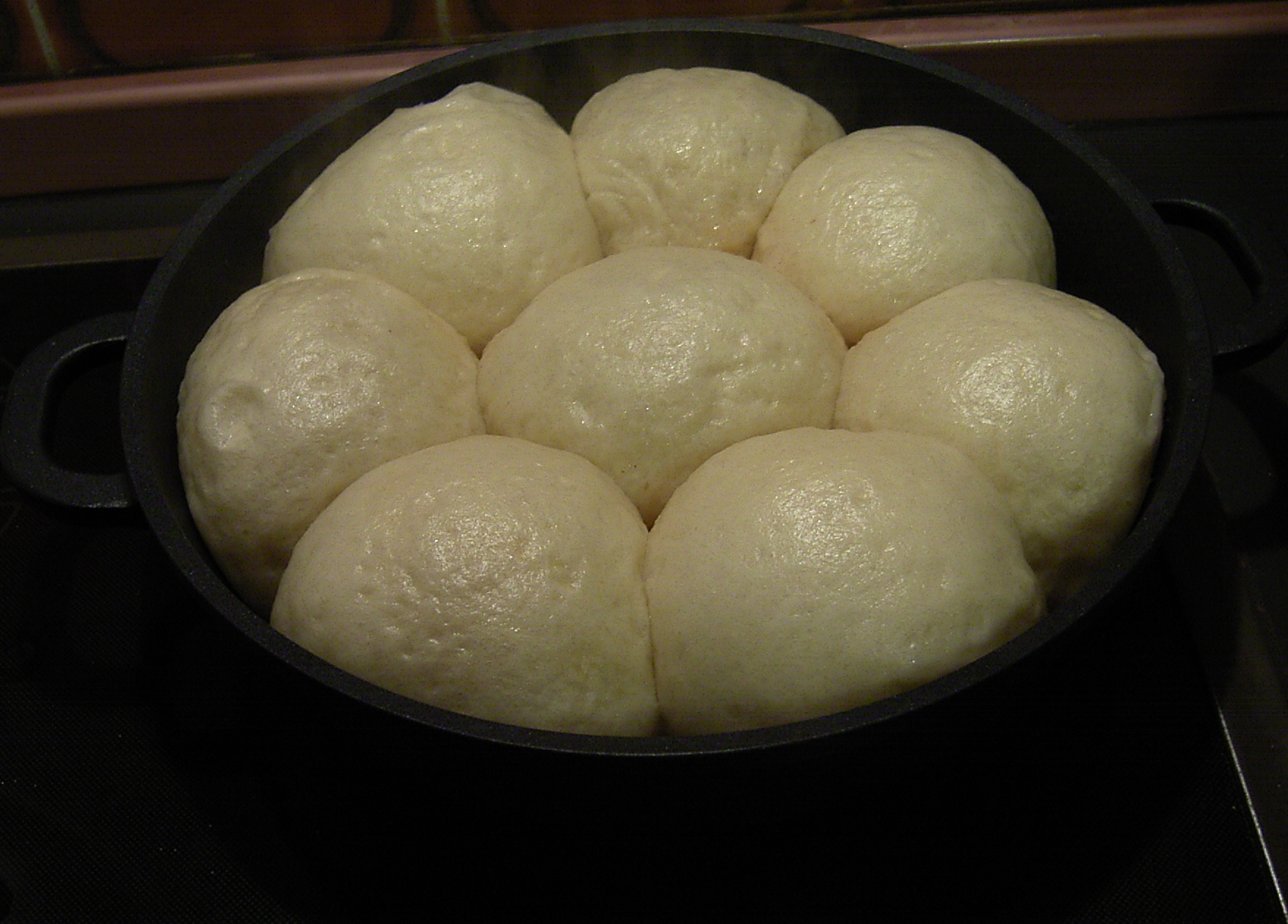
Dampfnudeln

The everyday cuisine of the citizens of the state capital Munich differed somewhat from that of the rural people, especially by the greater consumption of meat. In the city, more people could afford beef, and on festival days, roast veal was preferred. From 1840 to 1841, with Munich having a population of about 83,000 citizens, a total of 76,979 calves were slaughtered, statistically approximately one calf per citizen. The number of slaughtered cows was about 20,000. Bratwursts of beef were especially popular. In the 19th century, potatoes were also accepted as part of Bavarian cuisine, but they could still not replace the popularity of Dampfnudel.

A main reason for the preference for veal in Munich was the striking lack of space in town, allowing for smaller animals only. With its preserved, near-medieval grid of narrow lanes and streets and similarly narrow, half-gabled houses, including run-through staircases without landings called Himmelsleiter (Jacob's ladder), most people could only afford to keep two pieces or so of small framed livestock in ground floor crates at the rear ends of their houses. Calves reaching heifer size, nearing maturity, would consequently either have had to be slaughtered or to be sold out of town.

The typical meat-oriented Munich cuisine was not always accepted by others. One author wrote about Munich in a 1907 publication: "The 'Munich cuisine' is based on the main concept of the 'eternal calf'. In no other city in the world is so much veal consumed as in Munich … Even breakfast consists mainly of veal in all possible forms … mostly sausages and calf viscus! … The dinner and evening meal consist only of all sorts of veal … And still the Munich innkeepers speak of a 'substantial selection of dishes' without realising that the one-sidedness of the 'Munich veal cuisine' cannot be surpassed any more!"

== List of dishes ==
=== Appetisers ===
- Griebenschmalz

=== Soups ===
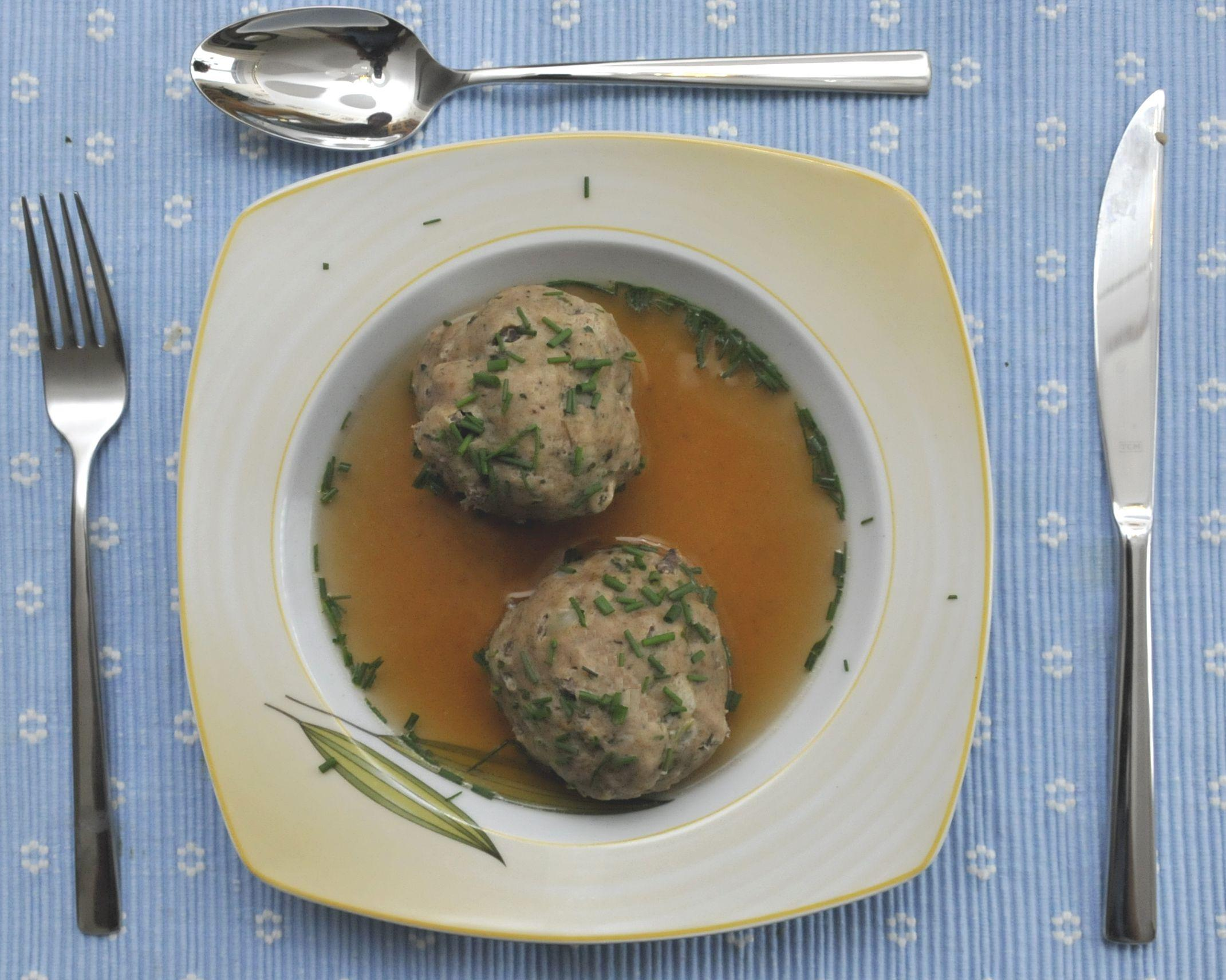
Leberknödelsuppe

- Bread soup
- Chanterelle soup with Semmelknödel
- Eintopf
- Griessnockerlsuppe (Semolina Dumplings Soup)
- Semolina Knödel soup
- Hochzeitssuppe
- Leberknödelsuppe Liver dumpling soup
- Liver Spätzle soup
- Pancake soup
- Sauerne Suppe ("sour soup", a soup made of hardened milk)
- Bacon Knödel soup

=== Main courses ===
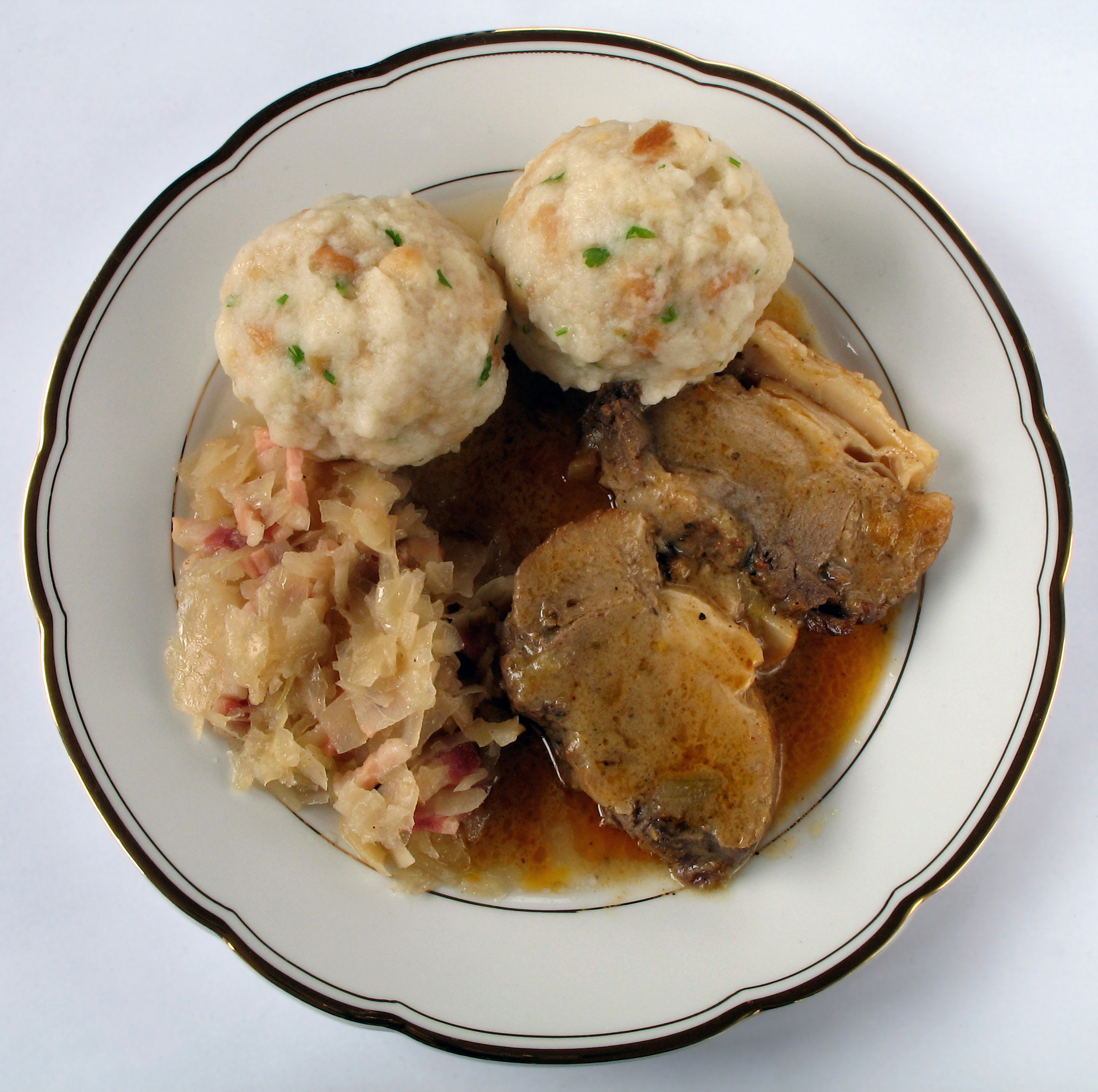
Schweinsbraten with bread roll Knödeln and cabbage salad

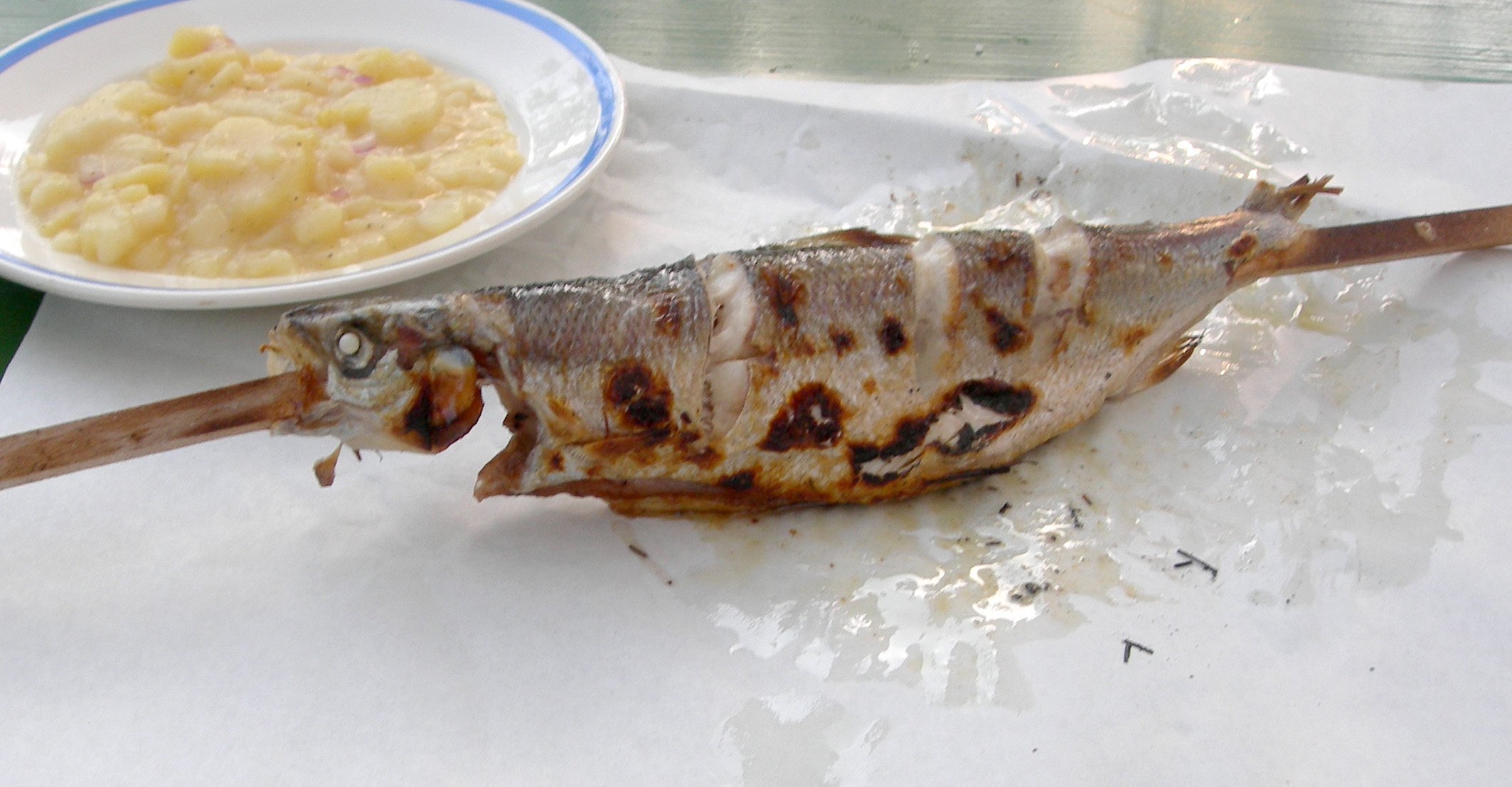
Steckerlfisch with potato salad

- Saures Lüngerl
- Roast pork with potato Knödel or Semmelknödel
- Surbraten, roasted cured pork or Haxe
- Krustenbraten
- Tellerfleisch
- Schweinsbraten – A traditional Bavarian roast pork dish that is common in upper Bavaria
- Schweinshaxe
- Sauerbraten
- Skirt steak
- Pichelsteiner
- Kalbsvögerl
- Kesselfleisch
- Reiberdatschi
- Fingernudeln
- Schupfnudeln
- Schmalznudeln
- Rohrnudeln
- Schuxen
- Bröselschmarrn
- Fleischpflanzerl
- Cabbage rolls
- Suckling pig
- Bröselbart
- Gnocchi
- Käsespätzle

=== Snacks ===
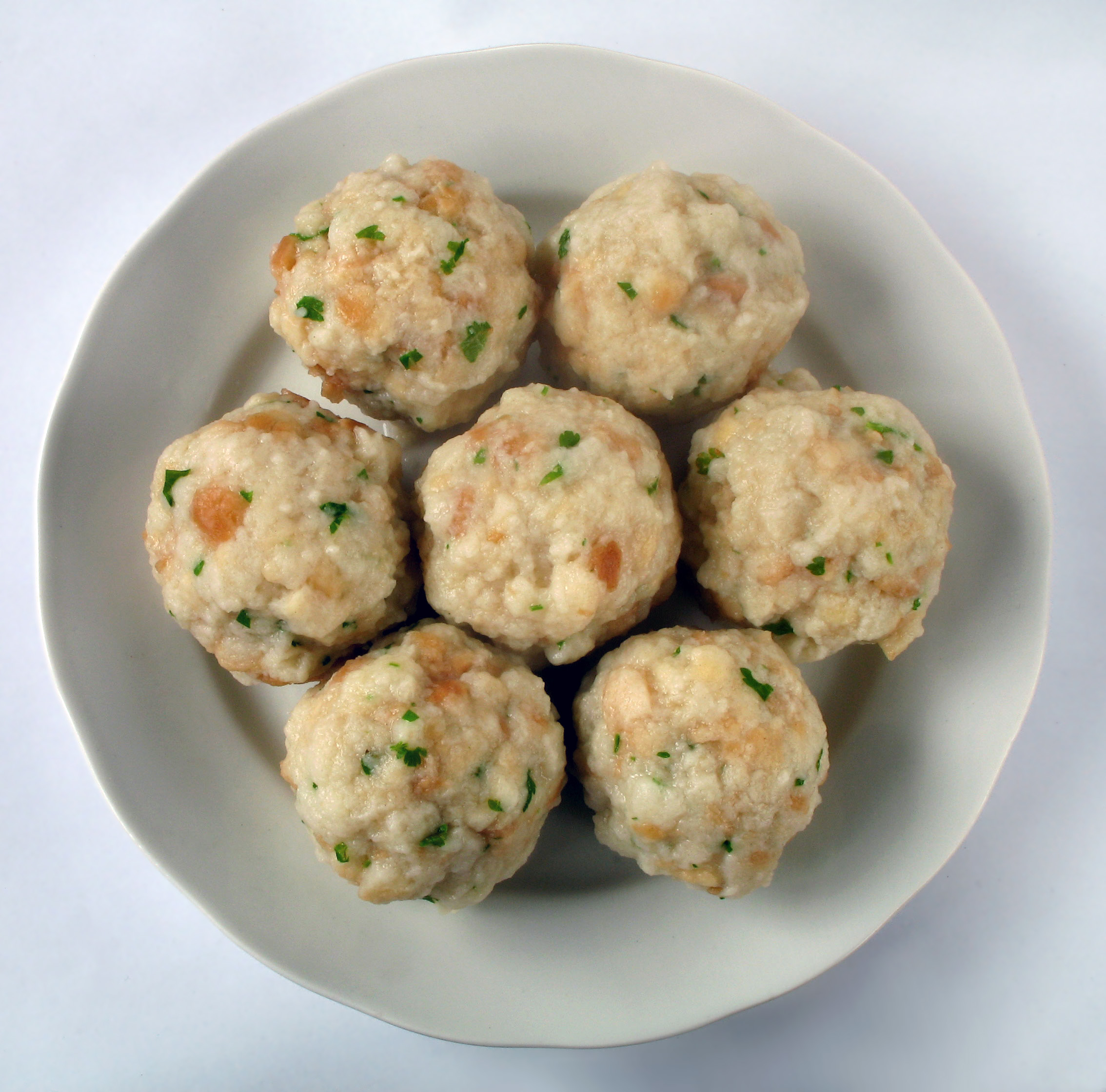
Bread roll Knödel

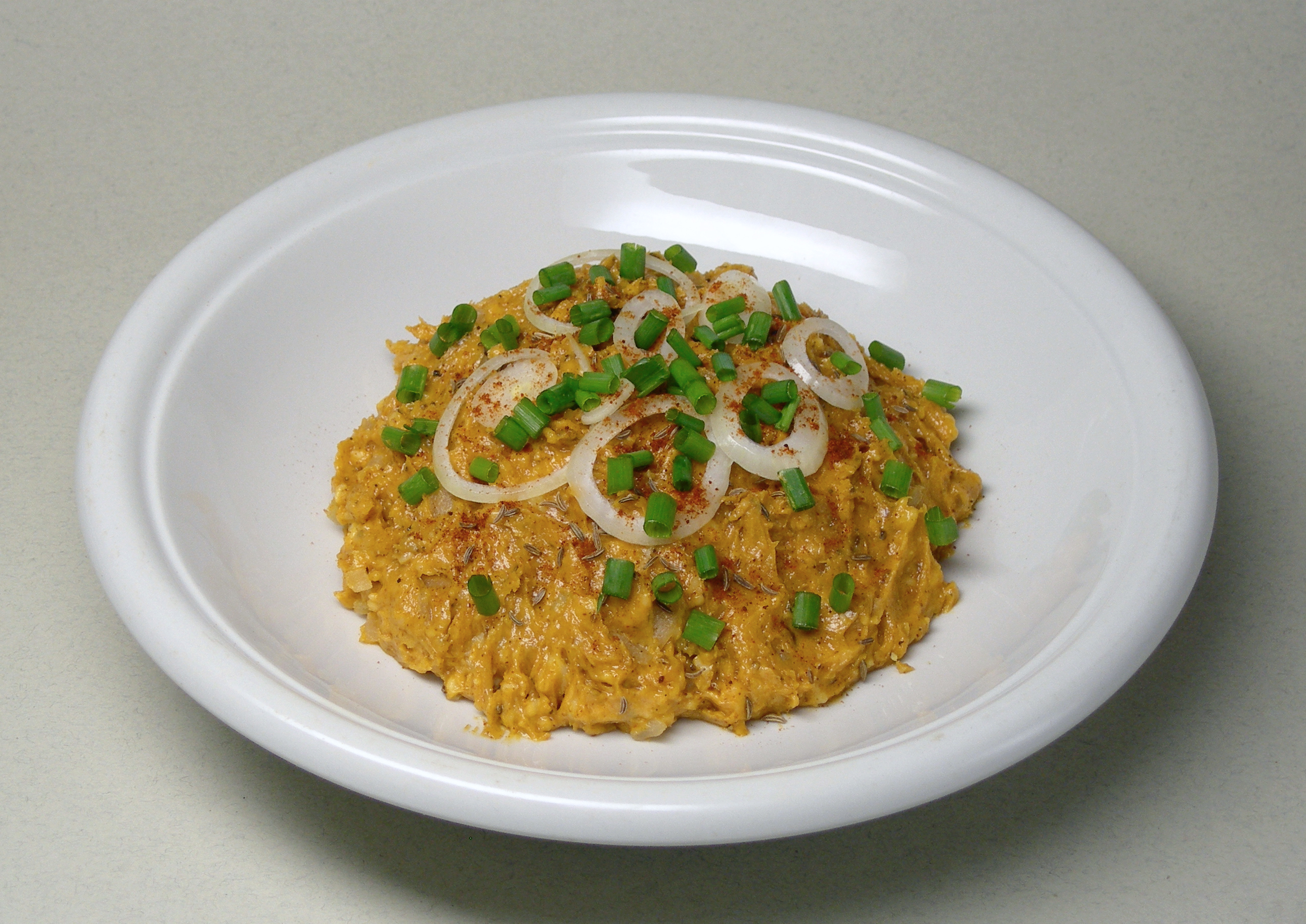
Obatzter

- Brezel
- Kartoffelkäse
- Obatzda

=== Delicacies ===
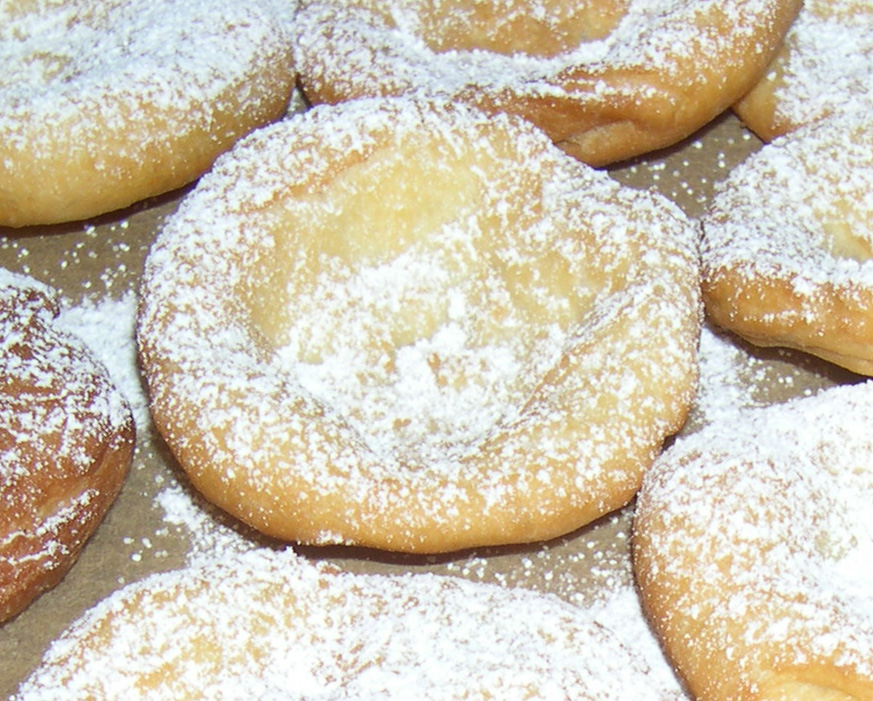
Auszogne

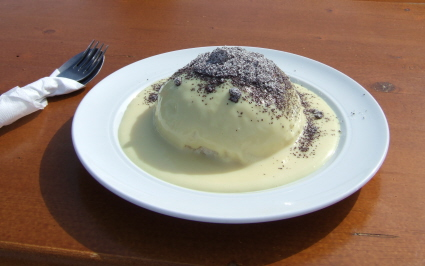
Germknödel with vanilla sauce

- Apfell
- Bratapfel
- Dampfnudel
- Kaiserschmarrn
- Germknödel
- Magenbrot
- Gebrannte Mandeln

=== Desserts ===
- Apfelstrudel
- Bavarian cream
- Baumkuchen
- Dampfnudeln – a steamed dumpling with a sweet fruit sauce
- French toast (Armer Ritter; [lit.] "Poor Knight")
- Bienenstich
- Gugelhupf
- Prinzregententorte
- Topfenstrudel
- Milchrahmstrudel (Millirahmstrudel)
- Zwetschgendatschi

=== Sausages and meat dishes ===
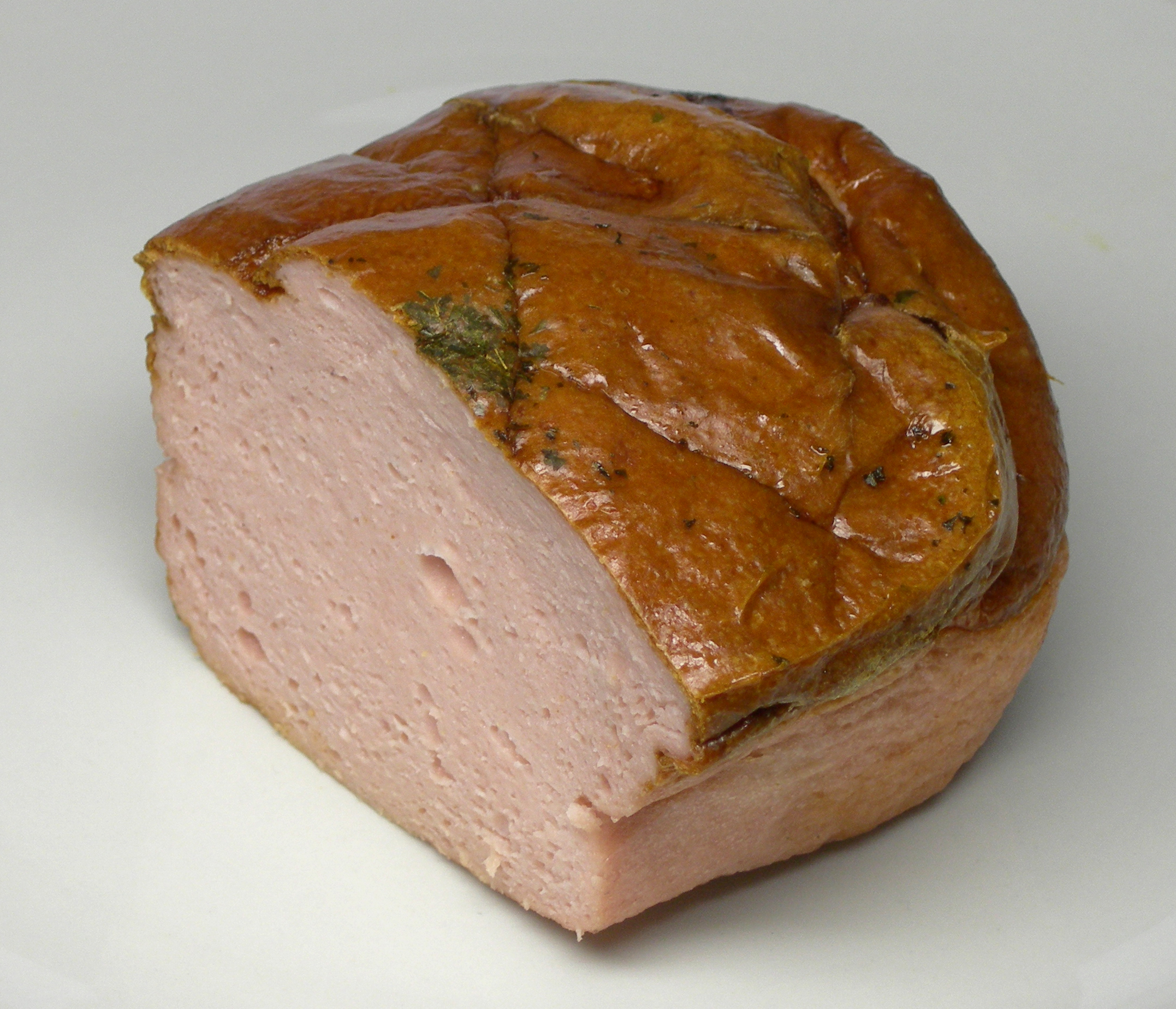
Leberkäse

Most Bavarian sausages are produced using pork.

- Head cheese
- Weißwurst with sweet mustard
- Black pudding
- Bierwurst
- Gelbwurst
- Milzwurst
- Wollwurst
- Stockwurst
- Regensburger Wurst
- Leberkäse
- Wiener Würstchen

=== Salads ===
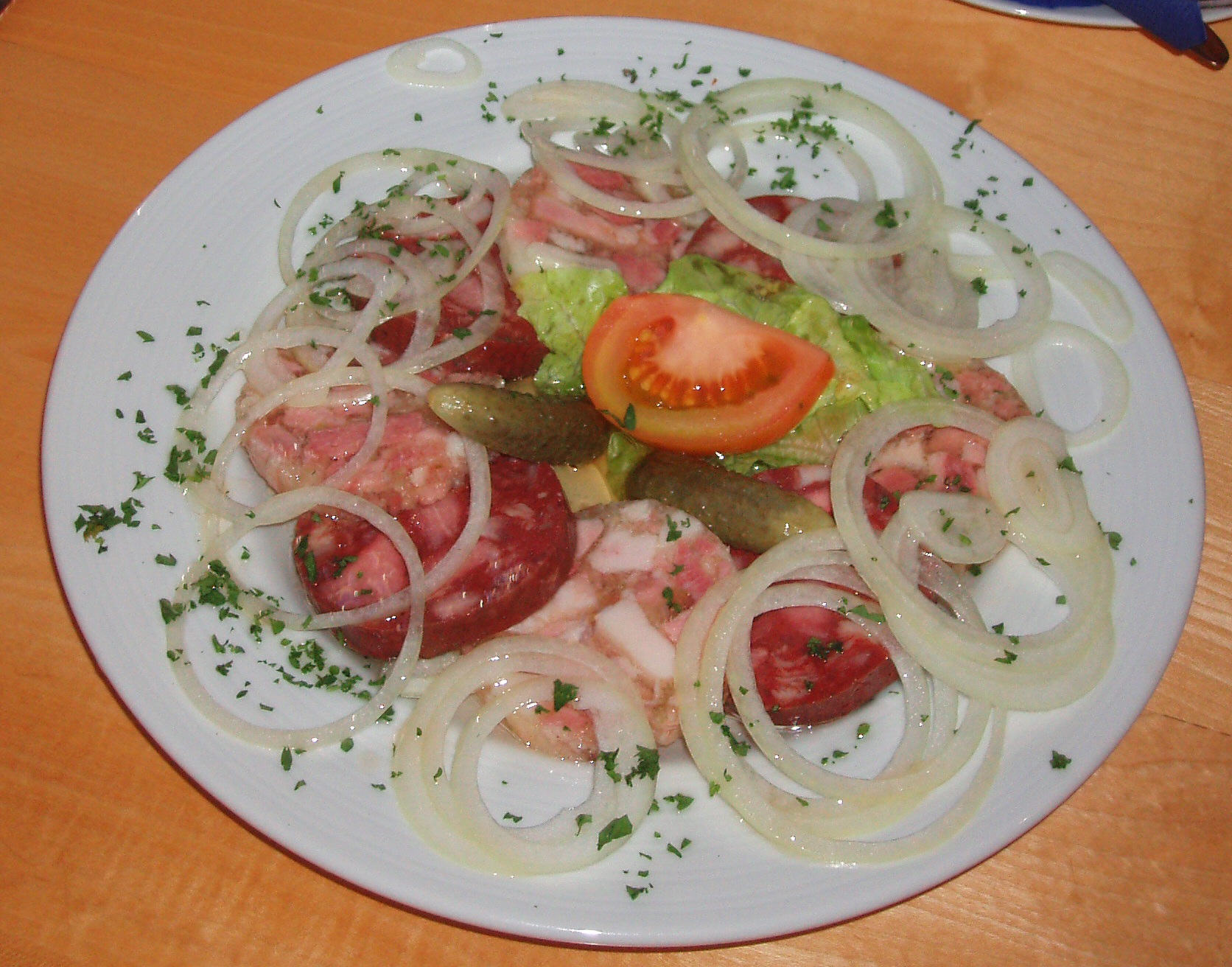
Sour Presssack

- Bavarian potato salad
- Potato and cucumber salad
- Bavarian Wurstsalat
- Coleslaw
- Sour Knödel

== Specialties ==
=== Bavaria ===
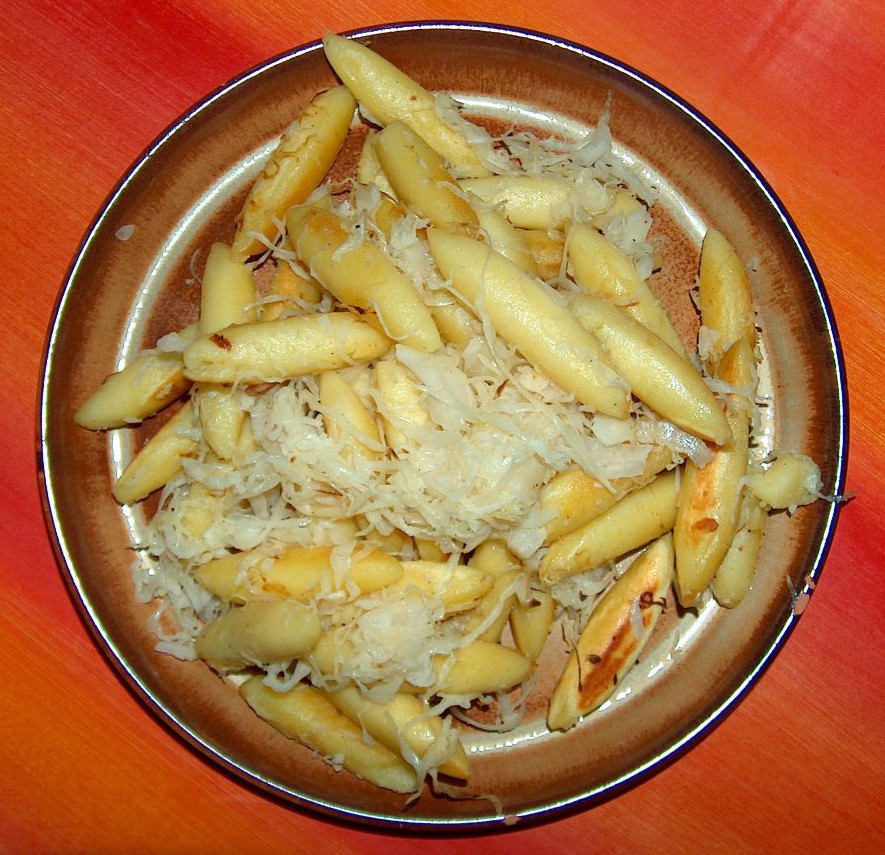
Schupfnudeln with sauerkraut

- Allerseelenzopf
- Auszogne
- Bayrisch Kraut
- Red cabbage
- Bavarian blue cheese
- Bauernseufzer
- Pretzels
- Böfflamott ("Boeuf à la mode")
- Kartoffelkäse
- Hopfenspargel
- Fried dough foods
- Horseradish
- Leberkäse
- Munich onion meat
- Sauerkraut
- Obatzda
- Asparagus
- Gwixte
- Head cheese
- Raphanus
- Black-smoked ham
- Steckerlfisch
- Weisswurst

=== Bavarian Swabia ===
- Brenntar
- Cheese spätzle
- Onion bratwurst
- Bergkäse
- Schupfnudel

=== Franconia ===
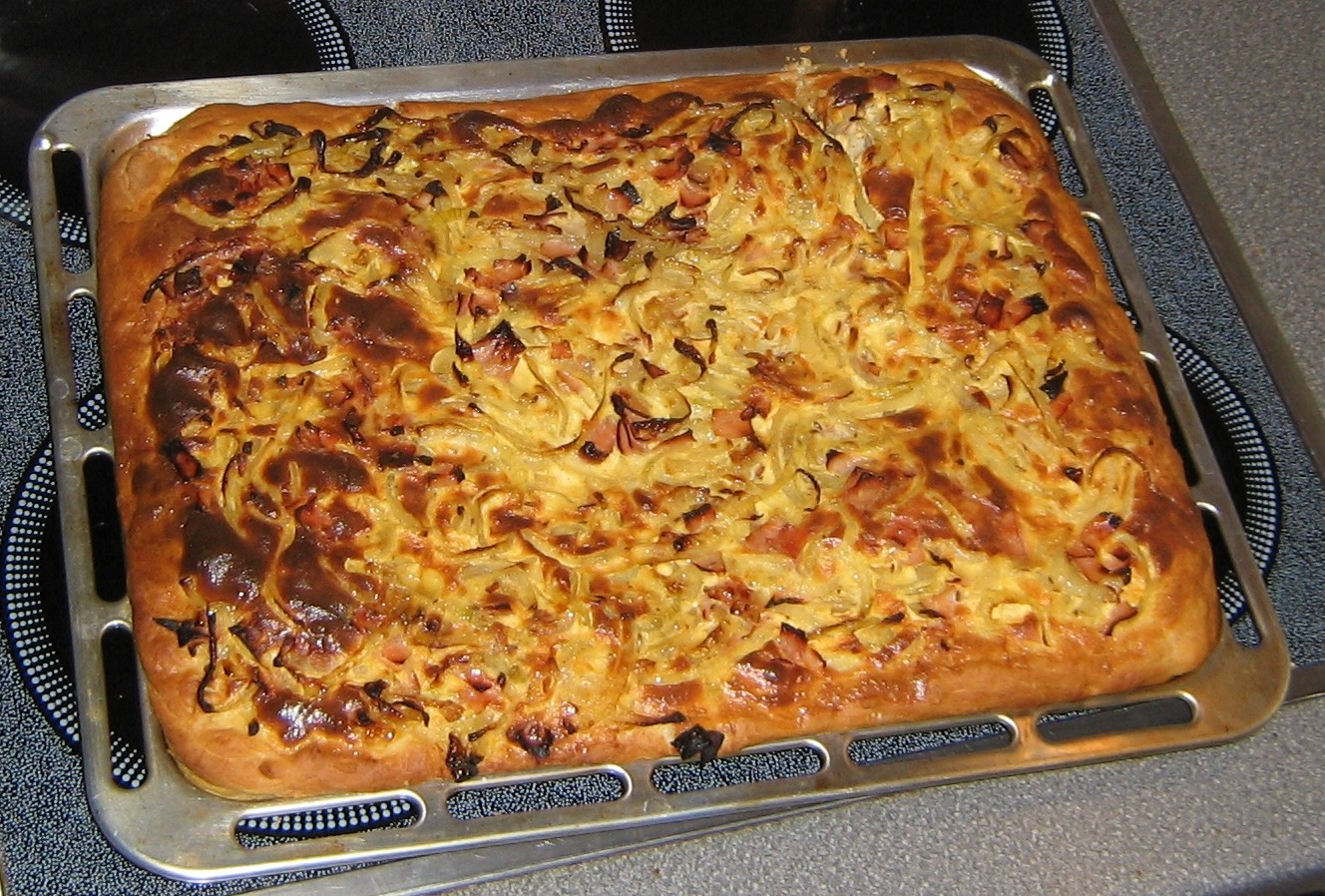
Franconian zwiebelkuchen

- Nuremberg bratwurst
- Nuremberg lebkuchen
- Franconian zwiebelkuchen
- Franconian wood oven bread
- Fruitcake
- Schlachtschüssel
- Saure Zipfel
- Schneeballen
- Schäufele

== Drinks ==
- Wheat beer
- Pale lager
- Radler
- Märzen
- Bock
- Spezi
- Shandy
- Bärwurzschnaps
- Blutwurzschnaps
- Enzianschnaps
- Obstler
- Franconian wine
