= Brotzeit =

German snack

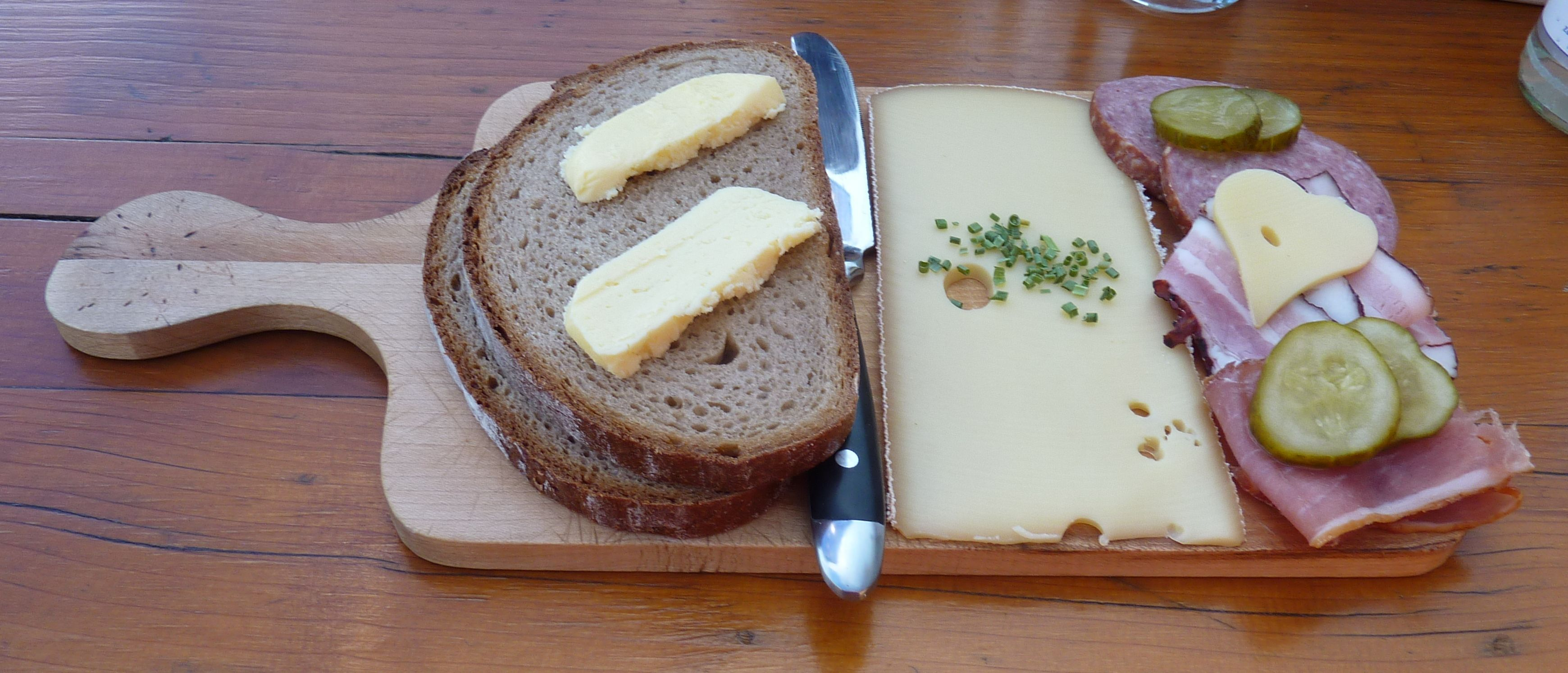
Brotzeit in Allgau, Bavarian Swabia

Brotzeit (German: [ˈbʁoːtˌt͡saɪ̯t], lit. trans. 'bread time') is a traditional German savory snack native to Bavarian cuisine.

Typical items consumed as part of Brotzeit include bread, butter, ham, sliced cheese, dried wurst, head cheese, hard-boiled egg, and popular condiments such as pickles, radishes, and onions.

Also commonly served as part of Brotzeit in Bavaria and Austria:

- Pretzels
- Kartoffelkäse – a creamy potato-based spread
- Obatzda – a cheese spread seasoned with paprika

== See also ==
- Charcuterie – Branch of cooking of prepared meat products, primarily from pork
- Salumi – Italian cured meat products predominantly made from pork
- Tea (meal) – Informal meal in the afternoon
