= Brotzeit (restaurant) =

Asian German-themed casual dining chain

Brotzeit International Pte Ltd
- Company type: Private company
- Industry: Food and beverage
- Genre: German casual dining
- Founded: 2006
- Headquarters: Singapore
- Area served: Southeast Asia, North Asia, Australia and New Zealand
- Key people: Gerhard Lanyi, M.A. (International); Carsten Kjeldmann (Singapore/International); Carsten Kjeldmann (Singapore)
- Products: Bavarian beer and food
- Services: Casual dining restaurant
- Website: www.brotzeit.co

Brotzeit (Chinese: 博灿) is a chain of casual dining restaurants based in Singapore, with franchised restaurants in 11 markets in the Asia-Pacific region. Brotzeit International was established in Singapore in 2006. The restaurant chain serves Bavarian cuisine and German beer.

== Directly-operated outlets ==
Brotzeit International has its headquarters in Singapore, and directly operates the restaurants in its home market. Markets outside Singapore are franchised.

Brotzeit's first outlet opened in 2006, in VivoCity. Additional outlets were opened in Raffles City in 2008, 313@Somerset in 2010, Star Vista in September 2012, Katong in late September 2013, and Westgate in 2014. The location at Star Vista shut down in 2016. Likewise, the location at 313@Somerset shut down sometime between 2019 and 2021.

== Franchised markets ==
In addition to the directly operated stores in Singapore, there are a total of 14 franchise restaurants throughout the Asia-Pacific region. Currently operating outlets include restaurants in Malaysia, Vietnam, and China.

Brotzeit International is a member of the FLA (Franchise and Licensing Association) of Singapore and the Franchise Council of Australia (FCA). Brotzeit International was awarded the Singapore Franchisor of the Year award in 2012 by the Franchising and Licensing Association of Singapore.

== Food ==
The chain serves Bavarian cuisine like Schweinshaxe (pork knuckles), Brezeln (pretzels). Brotzeit also serves its own proprietary sausage recipes for Käsekrainer, Hühnerwurst, Nürnberger, Weisswurst, Knoblauchwurst, Currywurst, and Bockwurst.

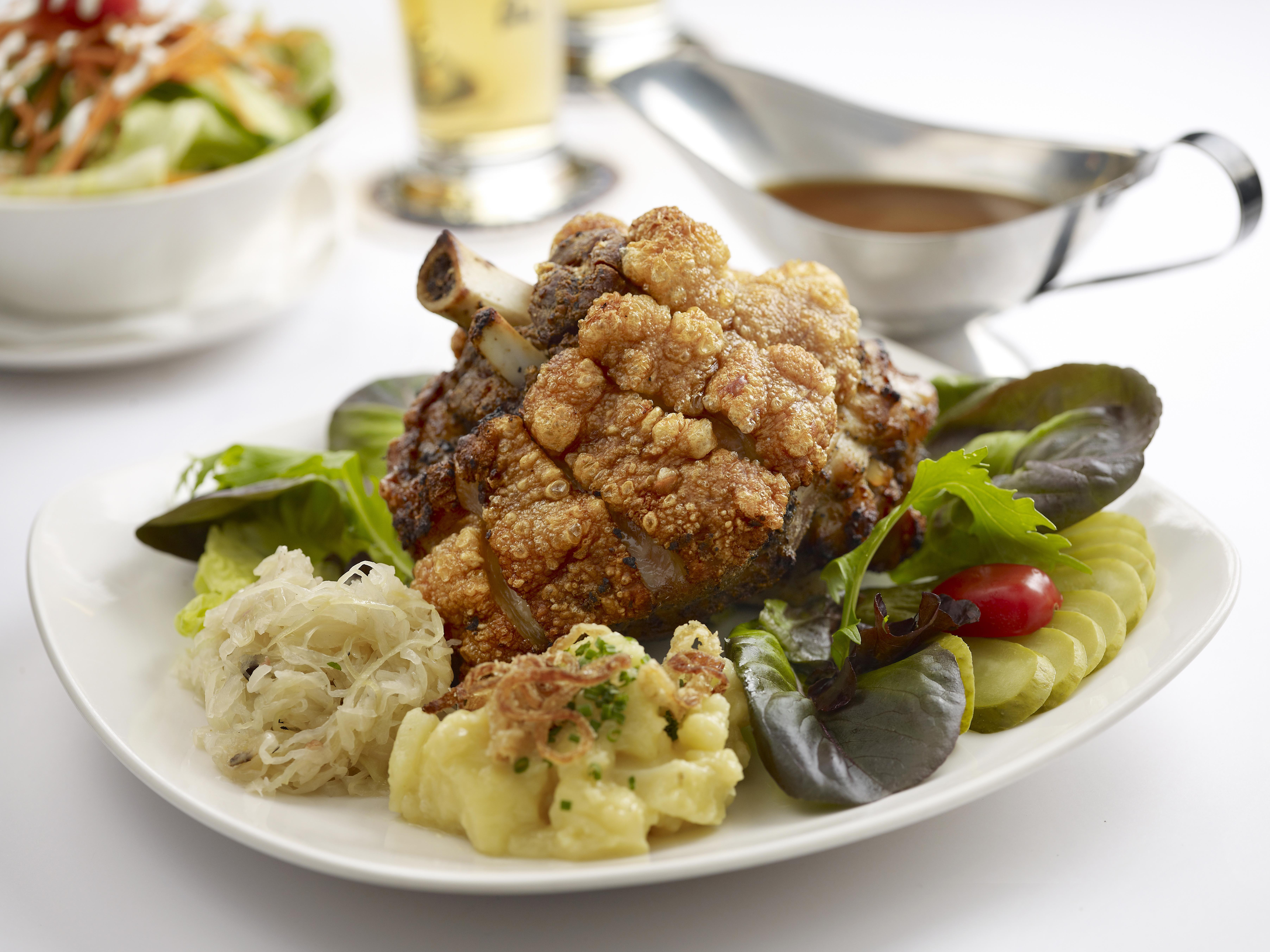
Brotzeit Pork Knuckle

== Beer ==
Beer (or Bier) served at Brotzeit is brewed according to the Reinheitsgebot (a.k.a. German Beer Purity Law or Bavarian Purity Law), which was passed in 1516. Most outlets serve Paulaner, Löwenbräu or Krombacher, imported directly from Germany. In some cases, other brands of Munich-based Biers are also available.

They also offer a wine selection, consisting of primarily Austrian and German wines.

== Celebrations ==
Traditional Bavarian festivals such as Oktoberfest, Maifest and Easter are celebrated at Brotzeit restaurants annually
