= Kartoffelkäse =

Potato spread

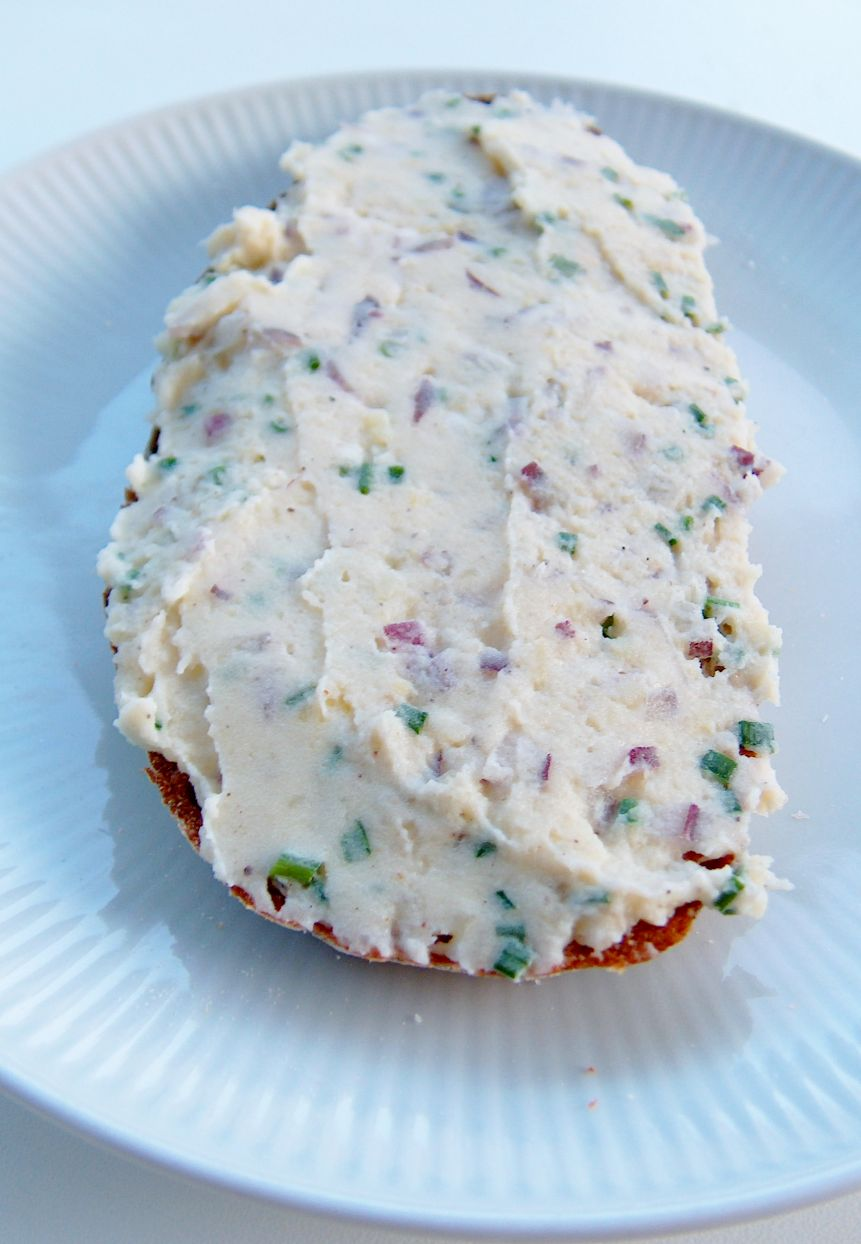
- Kartoffelkäse with red onion and chives
- Type: Spread
- Main ingredients: Potatoes, sour cream, cream, onions, caraway, parsley

Kartoffelkäse or in Austria usually Erdäpfelkäse (literally: potato cheese) is a spread from the regions of Bavaria and Austria. Its ingredients include potatoes, onions and sour cream.

== Origin ==
The name confuses as the spread does not contain any cheese (see also Leberkäse). The name is considered to derive from the milky-sweet flavour.

The spread was originally a dish that was prepared for the seasonal workers that helped with the potato harvest and was served as second breakfast or snack with milk, beer and must. It is very popular in Lower Bavaria, Inner and Western Austria and is made from floury potatoes, sour cream, cream and onions.

== Preparation ==
The potatoes are cooked and mashed and mixed with small diced onion (in proportions 3:1) and sour cream until it becomes a spreadable mixture. This is then flavoured with salt, black pepper, caraway, chives and sometimes garlic and parsley. Some recipes suggest to mix in a cooked egg, but this shortens the storage life considerably.

== See also ==
- Austrian cuisine
- Bavarian cuisine
- Brenntar
- List of spreads
- Obatzda
- Kartoffelklösse (a different potato dish)
