= Serviettenknödel =

German bread dumpling

Serviettenknödel (German pronunciation [ˈzɛʁviˌɛtn̩ˌknøːdl̩]), also called Serviettenklöße (lit. "napkin dumpling"), are a kind of bread dumplings made from dried wheat bread rolls like Kaiser rolls, milk and eggs. Servierttenknödel are a middle European dish made from the same dough as Semmelknödel and are usually served as a side dish. They are sometimes served as a main course or a dessert.

Many recipes vary greatly from region to region, both in the method of preparation and in the dough used. This covers the whole range of dumpling doughs in terms of base, leavening agents, and spices.

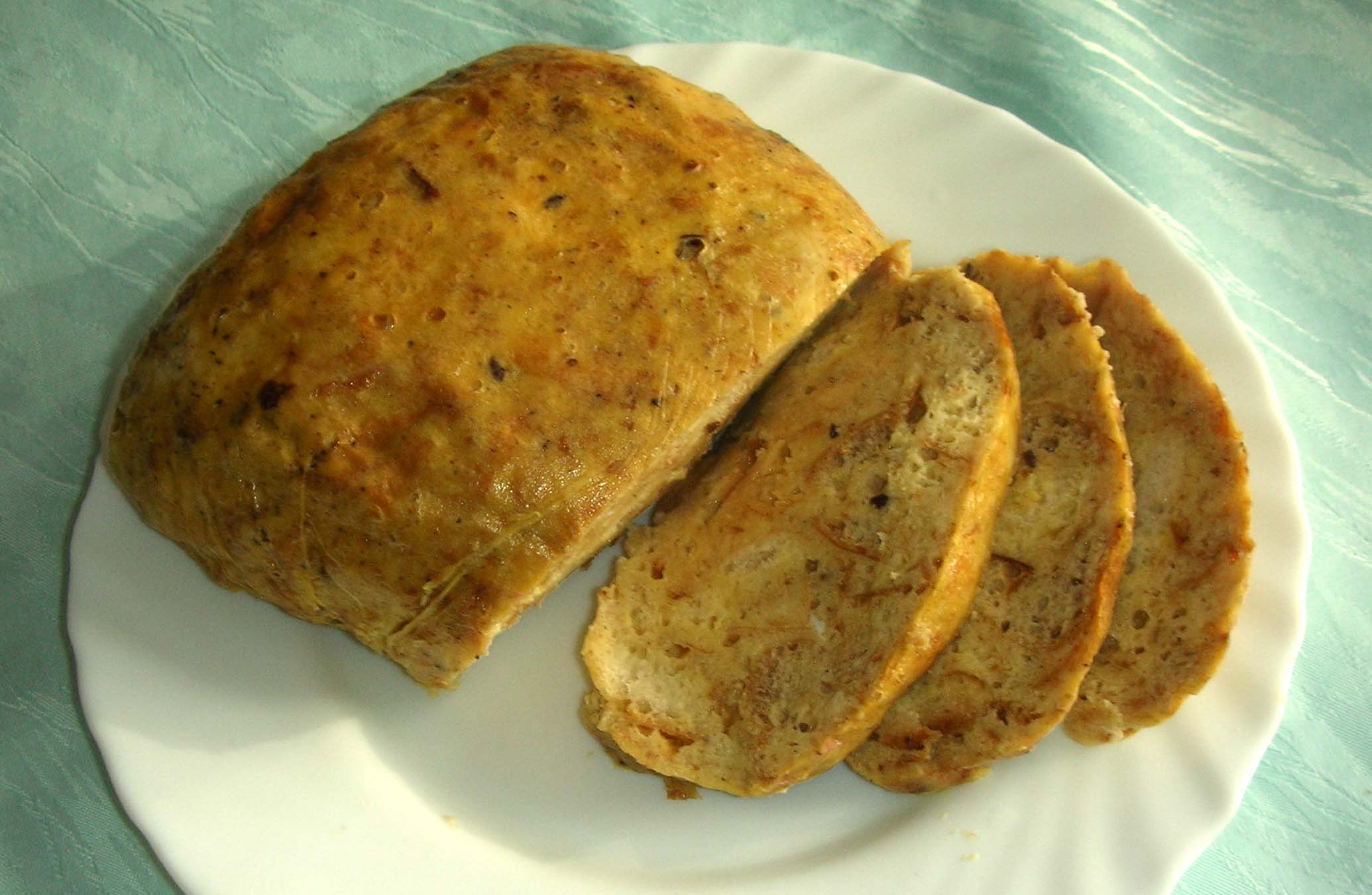
Serviettenknödel the Thuringian way

== Dough ==
The doughs used for Serviettenknödel are bread dumpling doughs, but also doughs made with flour with yeast as a leavening agent. Sometimes, they are filled by rolling out the dough and forming the dumplings into horn-shaped triangles. Following the south Thuringian and upper Franconian, Serviettenknödel are only made with the same dough as Semmelknödel.

== Cooking methods ==
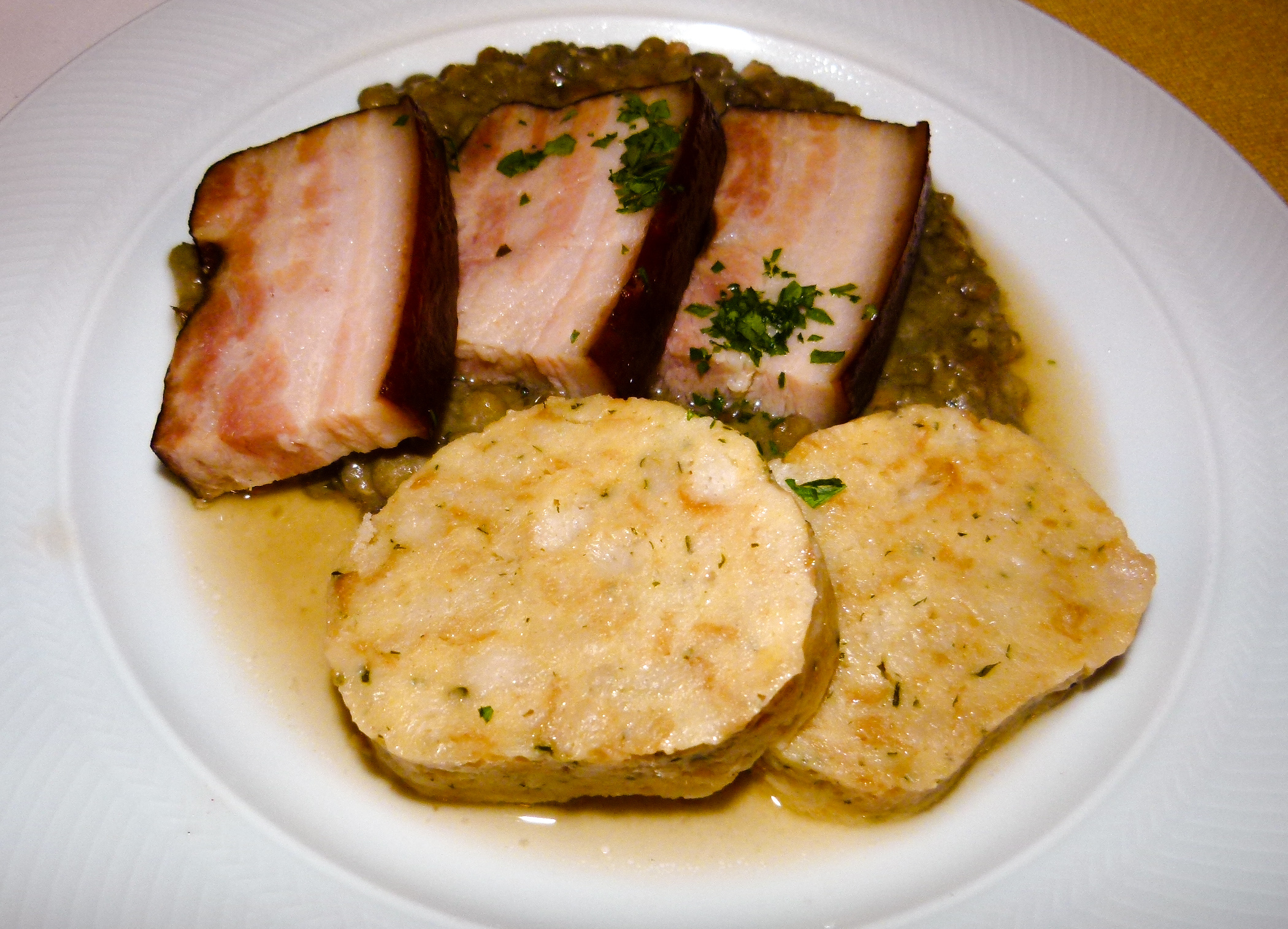
Vienniese cured meat with lentils and bacon and Serviettenknödel

In Austria, Upper Franconia, and Bohemia, it is customary to wrap the dumplings in cloth and boil them in water. In Bohemia, this method of preparation is called knedlíky uvařené v ubrousku (dumplings cooked in a napkin) or knedlíky uvařené vídenským způsobem (dumplings cooked Viennese style). In contrast, Bohemian dumplings are only cooked in water.

In southern German cuisine, the dough is wrapped in a napkin or other linen cloth and cooked in steam, i.e., over boiling water. Metal pan inserts are used for this.

The clothes used (like strudel cloths, for example) are usually washed without soap or detergent. They are disinfected by boiling and rinsing repeatedly until no soap residue or smell is detectable.

== Plating ==
After cooking and resting for a few minutes, the dumplings are cut with twine or a knife.

Serviettenknödel is mainly served with dishes rich in sauce, such as game goulash or braised meat, but also with stewed fruit. The large cut surfaces bind liquid well, both sauces and vegetable water. 'Serviettenknödel' made from Semmelknödel dough is popular in canteen kitchens, as a single large dumpling is easier to make than many smaller ones, allowing more portions to be prepared simultaneously.

== History and tradition ==
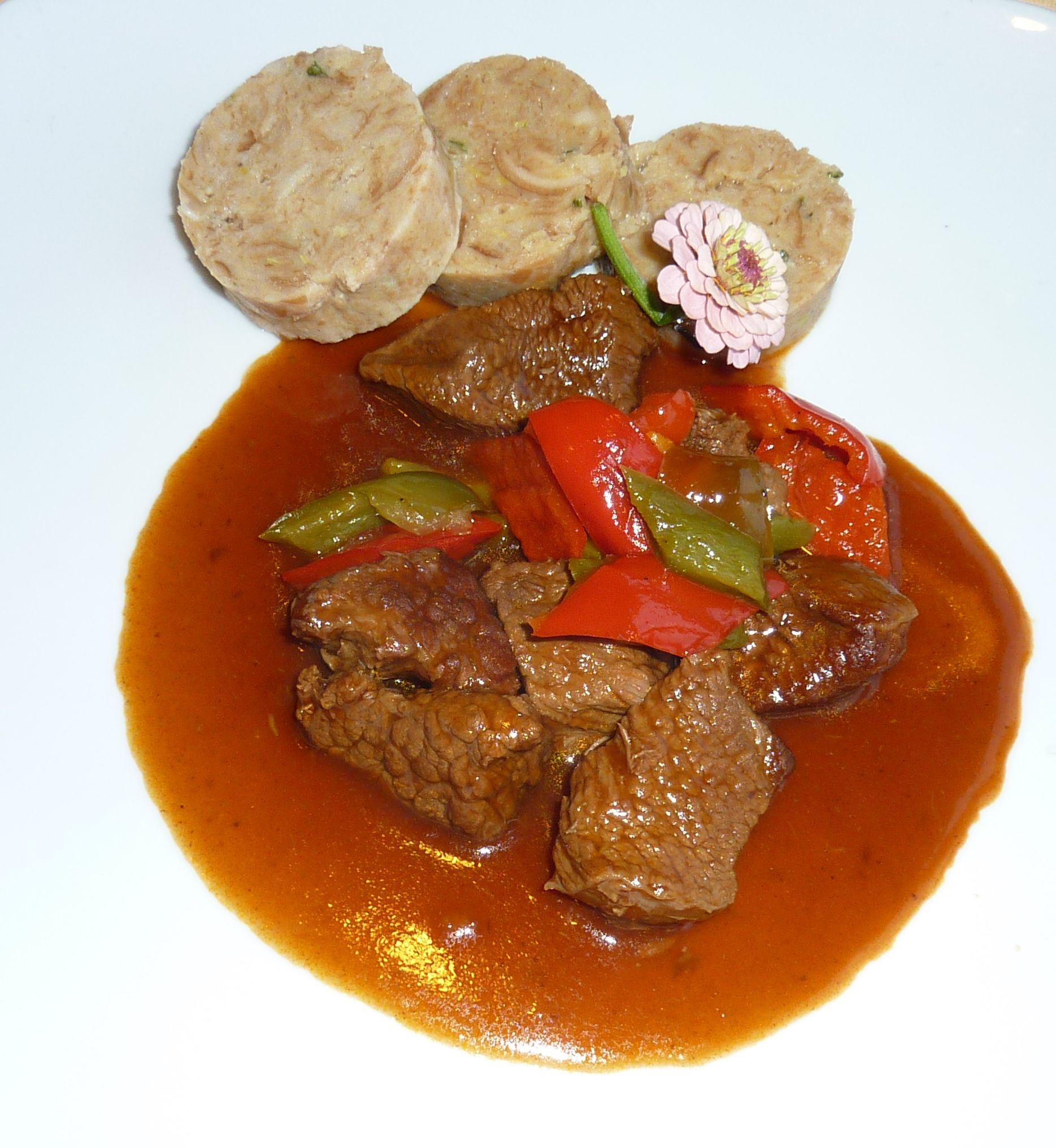
Goulash with stewed bell pepper and Serviettenknödel

It is not known when and where the Serviettenknödel was invented. Until the 1930s, it was only known in Thuringia and Upper Franconia as well as in the area around Hamburg.

In the northern German cuisine

In the area around Hamburg, the Serviettenknödel was eaten only by the middle classes for a long time, usually only for special occasions. Around the 1830s, it found its way into the kitchens of ordinary people and the lower classes. It became an everyday side dish, but continued to be appreciated at festive meals.

As a wedding dish in Thuringia and Upper Franconia

At the beginning of the 18th century, the Serviettenknödel became established in southern Thuringia and Upper Franconia as a side dish for wedding roasts. Unlike in northern Germany, it was not used for everyday dishes. On closer inspection, it is also noticeable that there were regional differences in the importance of the dumpling for traditional cuisine.

In south-west Thuringia, the serving of Serviettenknödel was a new, 'outstanding specialty limited to this feast (that of a wedding)', as they were otherwise deliberately not prepared for normal meals. In contrast, in the region from southern Vogtland to Franconian Switzerland, the Serviettenknödel was already known before the 18th century and was sometimes also prepared for other banquets such as church consecrations, communions, etc. The difference was even clearer in the region south of the Main. In that region, it was almost exclusively served as a side dish at wedding banquets with Sauerbraten (a German roast meat), whereas potato dumplings were preferably served with roast pork, which also emphasises the status of the Serviettenknödel, as it, like Sauerbraten, is the somewhat finer, better dish compared to roast pork and potato dumplings.

Despite the rather strict rules as to when Serviettenknödel were served and when they were not, except in East Upper Franconia, folklorist Günter Wiegelmann believes that this type of dumpling was also occasionally served for other festive occasions. In the following centuries, these strict food conventions were increasingly relaxed, so today, Serviettenknödel is served as a normal side dish with Sunday roasts in Upper Franconia and southern Thuringia. However, it is not served with all roasts, but mainly with those with a thicker sauce, such as the sauce of veal cream roast or Sauerbraten and the like.
