= Wollwurst =

German sausage

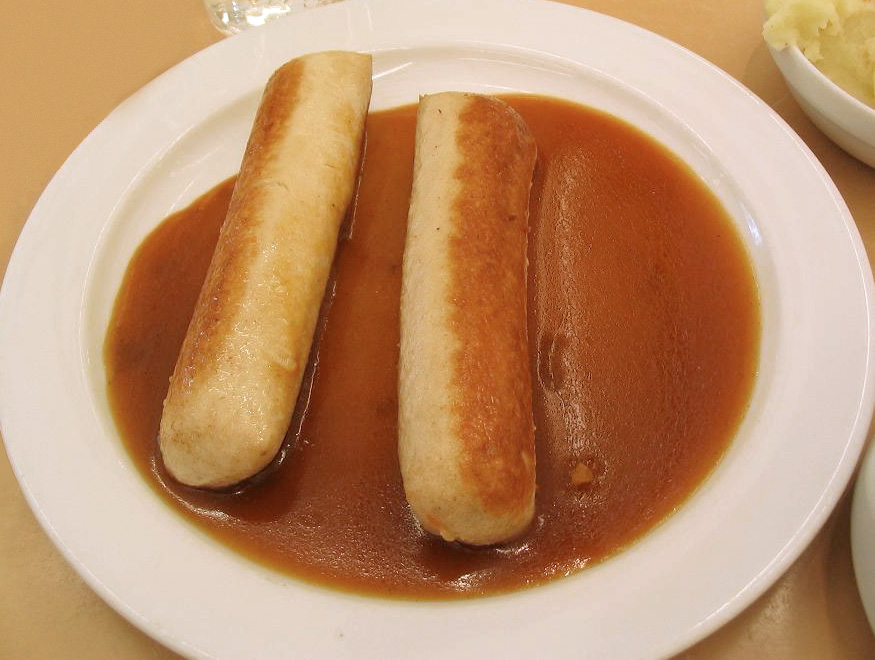
Wollwurst in gravy

Wollwurst is a speciality similar to Weißwurst made from veal and pork. These sausages are also called "Nackerte", "Geschwollene", "Geschlagene" or "Oberländer" and are usually longer and thinner than Weißwürste.

The recipe hardly differs from the one for Weißwurst although less pork rind and no parsley is used. The sausage does not have a casing but is put directly into hot water and boiled for about ten minutes and subsequently chilled which gives them their typical "wooly" surface. They can be eaten immediately, but it is more common to fry them first. This is done by dunking them in milk and sauteeing them until they are golden yellow. In this process they usually swell up, and are then served with warm potato salad prepared with oil and vinegar.

In Baden-Württemberg the sausage is called Oberländer and is used for making Currywurst. Another variant is Stockwurst.

== See also ==
- Bavarian cuisine
- Sausage
