= Fromage fort =

French cheese spread

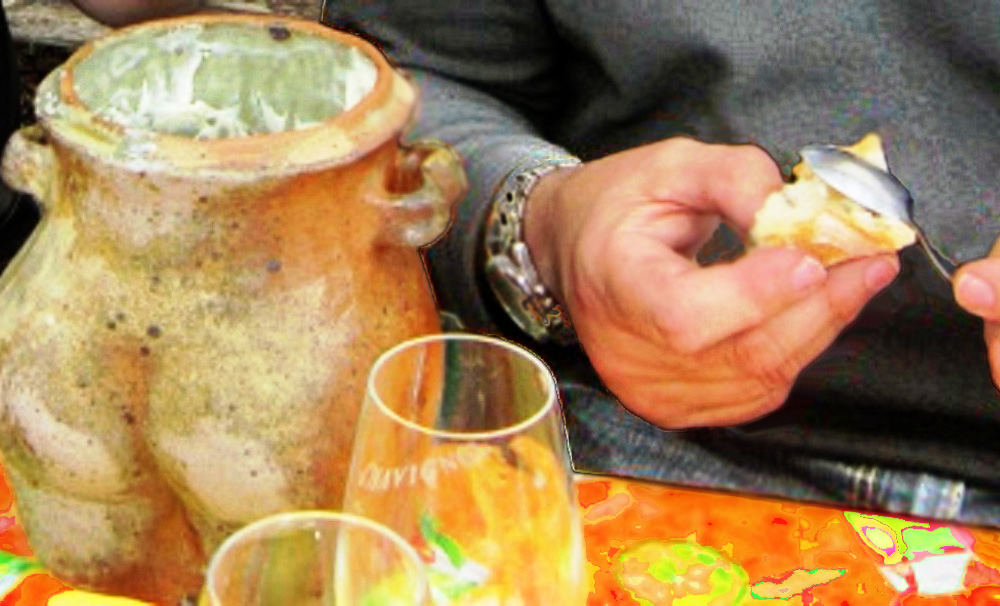
- Type: Spread
- Main ingredients: Cheeses, white wine or other spirit, garlic, herbs

Fromage fort (literally "strong cheese") is a French cheese spread traditionally made by blending together pieces of different leftover cheeses, white wine (or other spirits), garlic, and various herbs. Other ingredients include pepper and leek broth. Aging is optional, and brings out strong flavors once done.

Blue cheese, while one of the possible components, is usually included in small quantities, as its flavor is often stronger than other traditional ingredients.

Cheeses commonly used in fromage fort include:

- Camembert
- Brie
- Swiss cheese
- Parmigiano-Reggiano
- Goat milk cheese

== History ==
The history of the spread is unclear. Some believe it to have been created in the French countryside to repurpose leftover cheese as a snack.

== Uses ==
Fromage fort can be eaten chilled or at room temperature. Common ways to eat include pairing the spread with crackers or vegetables, or smearing it on slices of bread and baking it.

== Similar products ==
Obatzda, from Germany is a similar cheese spread produced by blending cheeses, flavourings, butter, and beer.

== See also ==
- List of spreads
