= Nürnberger Rostbratwurst =

German boiled sausage

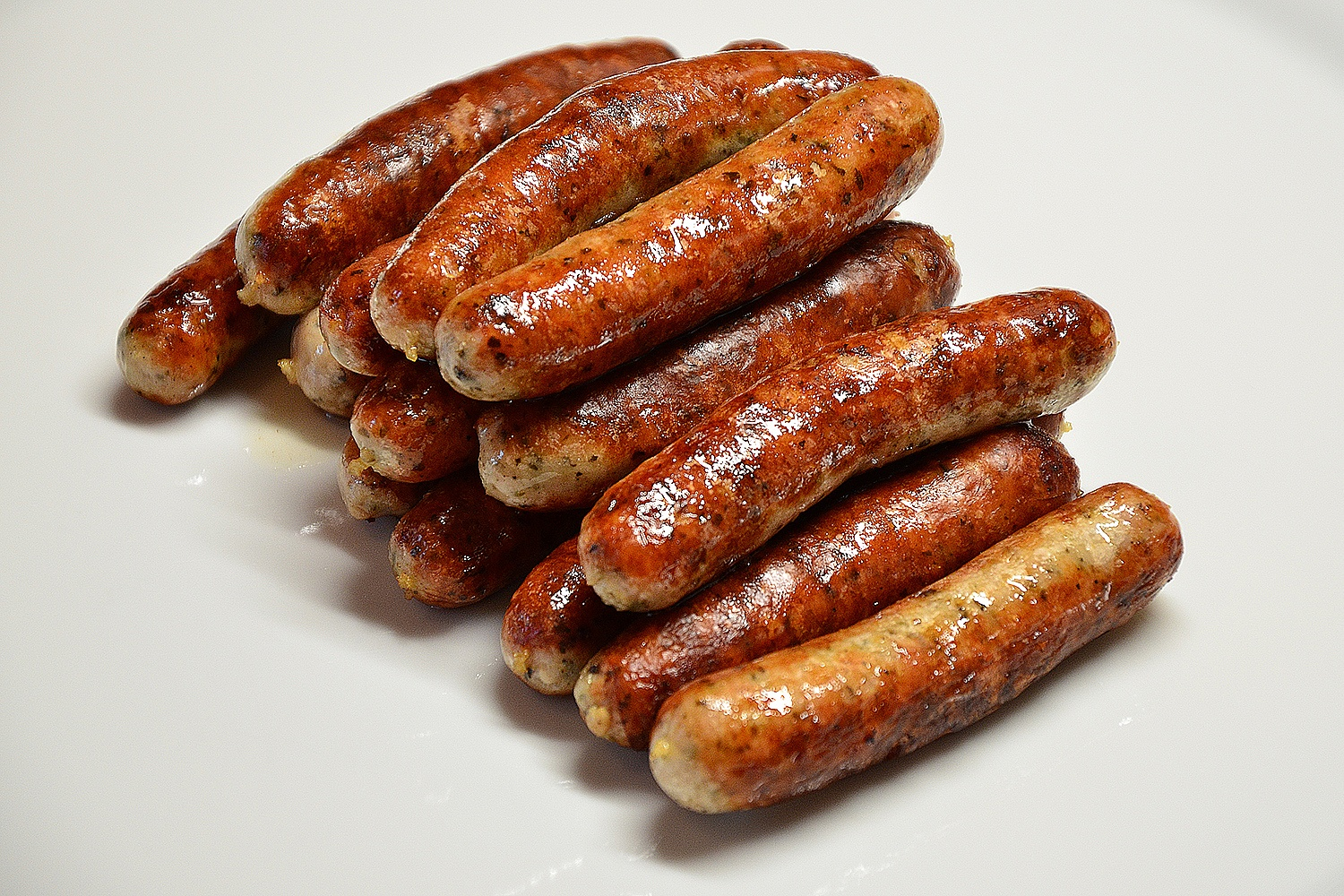

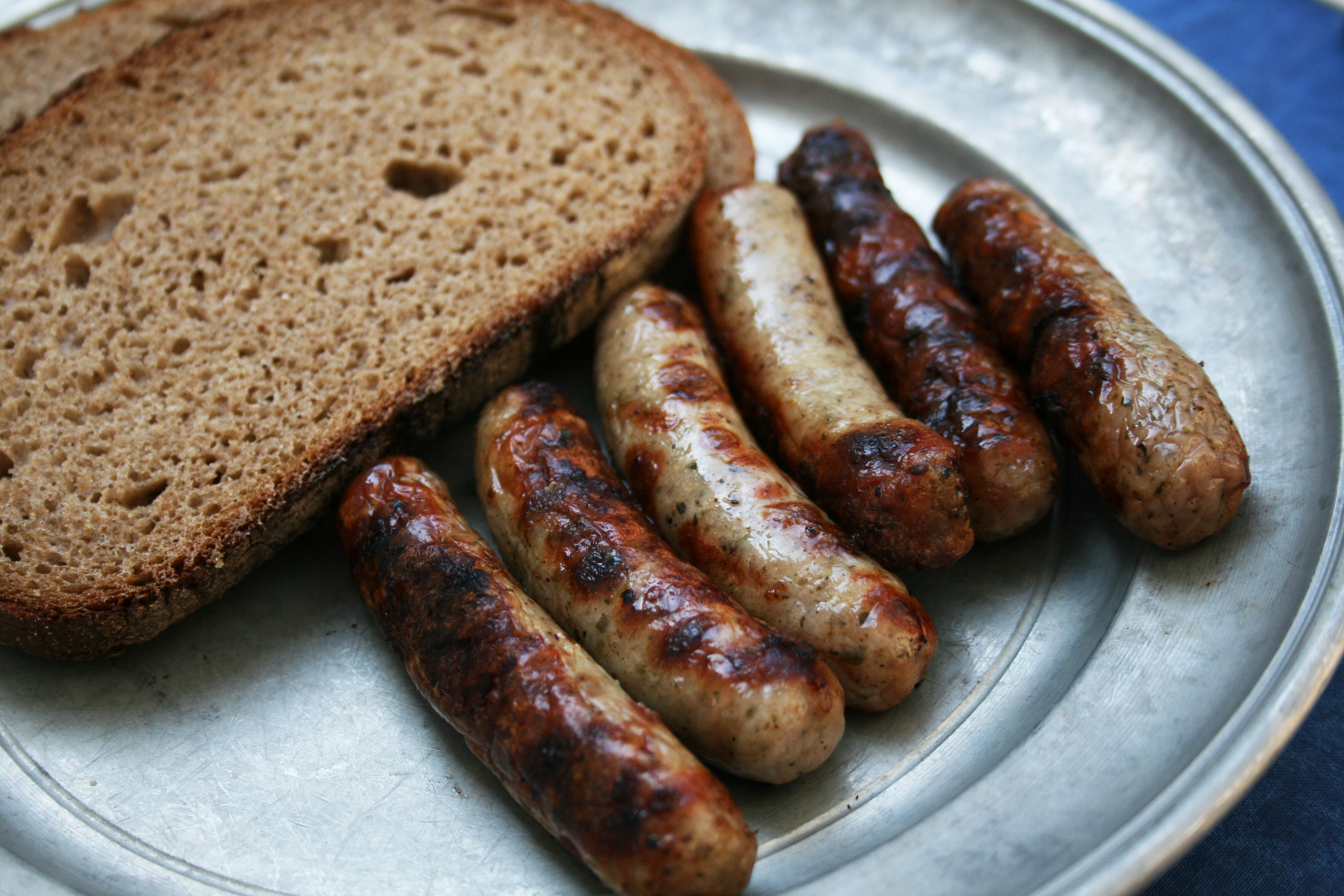
Nürnberger Rostbratwurst

Nürnberger Rostbratwurst, literally "Nuremberg grilled sausage", is a partially boiled German sausage, typical of the city of Nuremberg.

== History ==
The recipe is very old: according to historical sources it dates back to 1300. It seems that the poet Johann Wolfgang Goethe also loved Nürnberger Bratwürste, so much so that he had them sent by mail to Weimar.

== Characteristics ==
Small and thin and light in color (Bratwurst), the weight is about twenty grams for about 7–9 centimeters in length and 2 centimeters in diameter. Produced with pork without tendons and rind as well as bacon, Nuremberg sausages are flavored with marjoram. Other aromas include pepper, chervil, cardamom, ginger and lemon, as well as salt, the various mixtures vary according to the producer. The casing used is made of sheep.

== Protected designation of origin ==
Nürnberger Rostbratwurst is protected throughout the European Union as a "protected geographical indication" (PGI). This means that products sold within the EU as Nürnberger Rostbratwurst can only be produced in the city of Nuremberg.

== Consumption ==
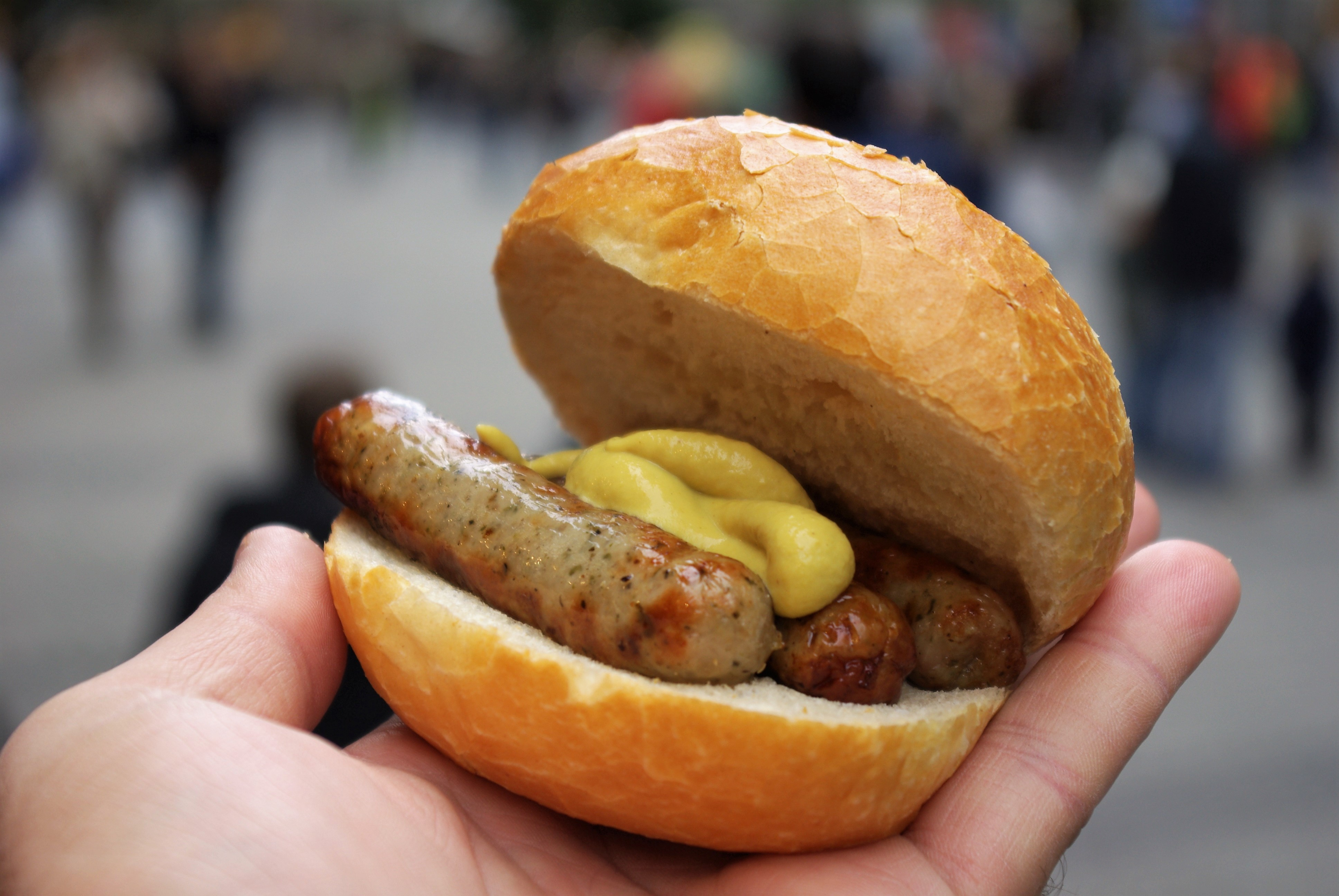
3 Nürnberger Rostbratwürste with mustard in 2 slices of bread, also called Drei im Weggla

A typical preparation of them is well roasted on the grill and placed three at a time in a Bread roll, seasoned with mustard, also called "Drei im Weggla" in Nuremberg. This is also the way they can be found in the many kiosks in Nuremberg that offer snacks. If they are eaten as a main meal, they are accompanied by sauerkraut, potato salad or horseradish.

== See also ==
- Currywurst
- Choucroute alsaziana
- Hot dog
- Leberkäse
- Leberwurst
- Thüringer Rostbratwurst
- Weißwurst
