= Steckerlfisch =

Fish grilled on a stick

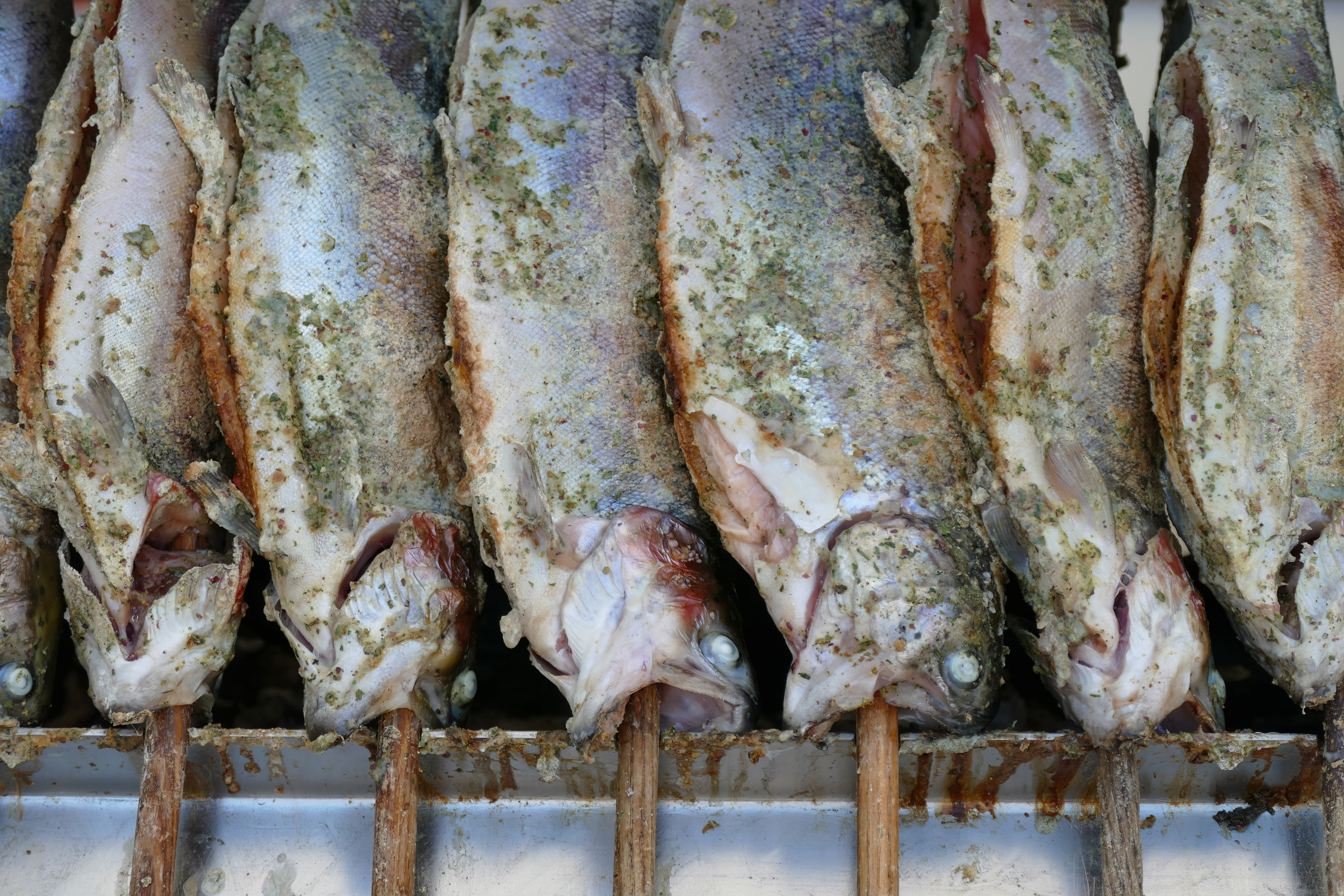
Steckerlfisch in Munich

Steckerlfisch ("steckerl" means "small stick" or "pole" in the Bavarian dialect) is a fish grilled on a stick in the traditional way of a fisherman or camper. It is considered a speciality of Austria, Bavaria, and Franconia. The dish is commonly served in beer gardens and on folk festivals and is unrelated to the dried stockfish.

Traditionally, steckerlfisch is prepared from local fish like coregonus or whitefish like common bream, but nowadays trout, char or mackerel are also used.

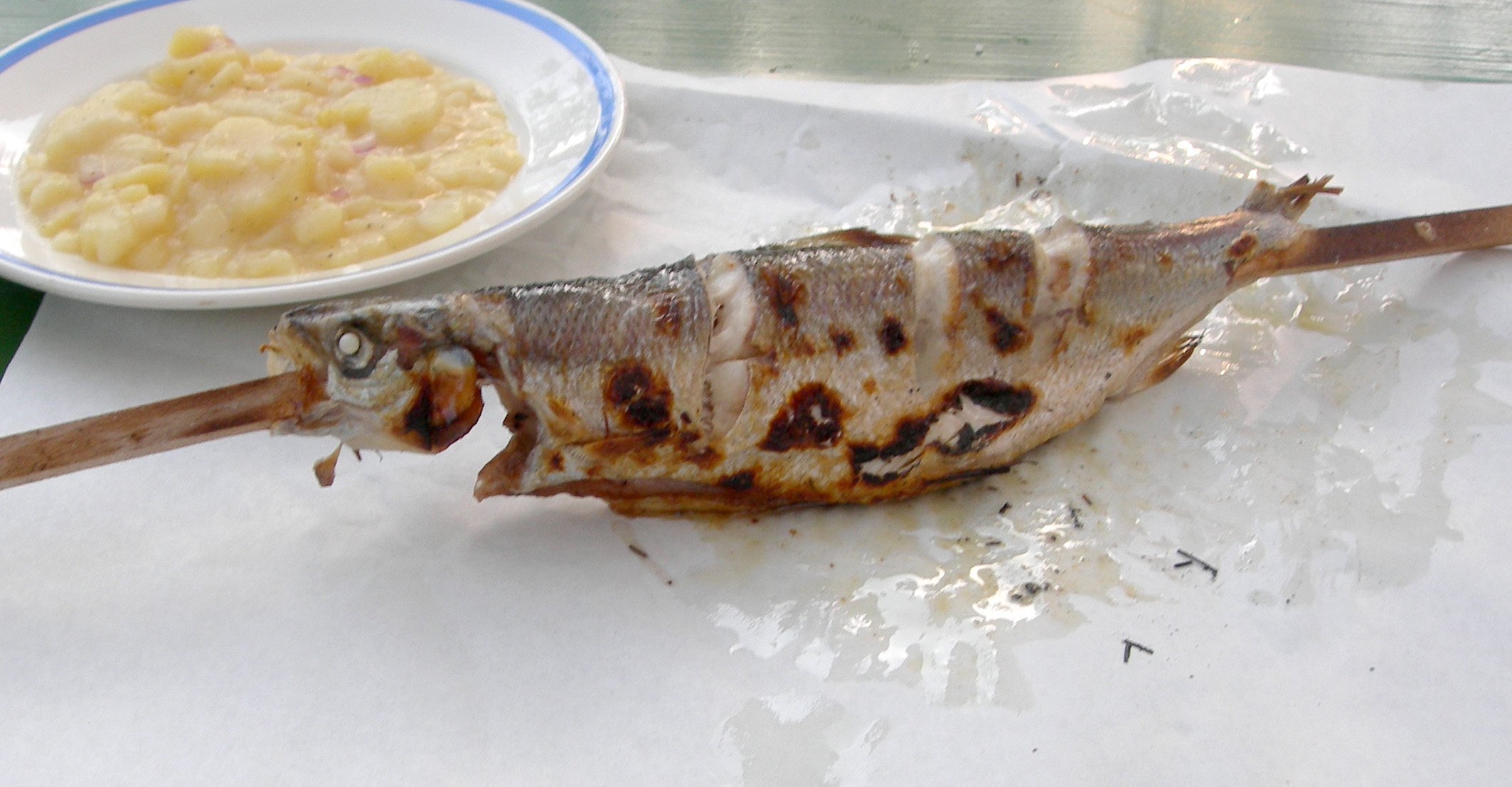
Steckerlfish as it is served

Steckerlfisch is a very popular meal at the Munich Oktoberfest. It was the Oktoberfest which made the dish popular. A local fish merchant introduced steckerlfisch to the fair in the early part of the 20th century.

== Preparation ==
The whole gutted fish are marinated in a hearty mixture of oil, spices and garlic and skewered on sticks of about 60 cm length. The sticks are then fixed in a way that the fish are positioned upside-down and angular next to the embers. During the process of grilling they are brushed a few times with the marinade so that the skin becomes crispy.

The steckerlfisch is eaten on the paper in which it is wrapped after being grilled and served on a plate. Common side dishes are bread roll or pretzels.

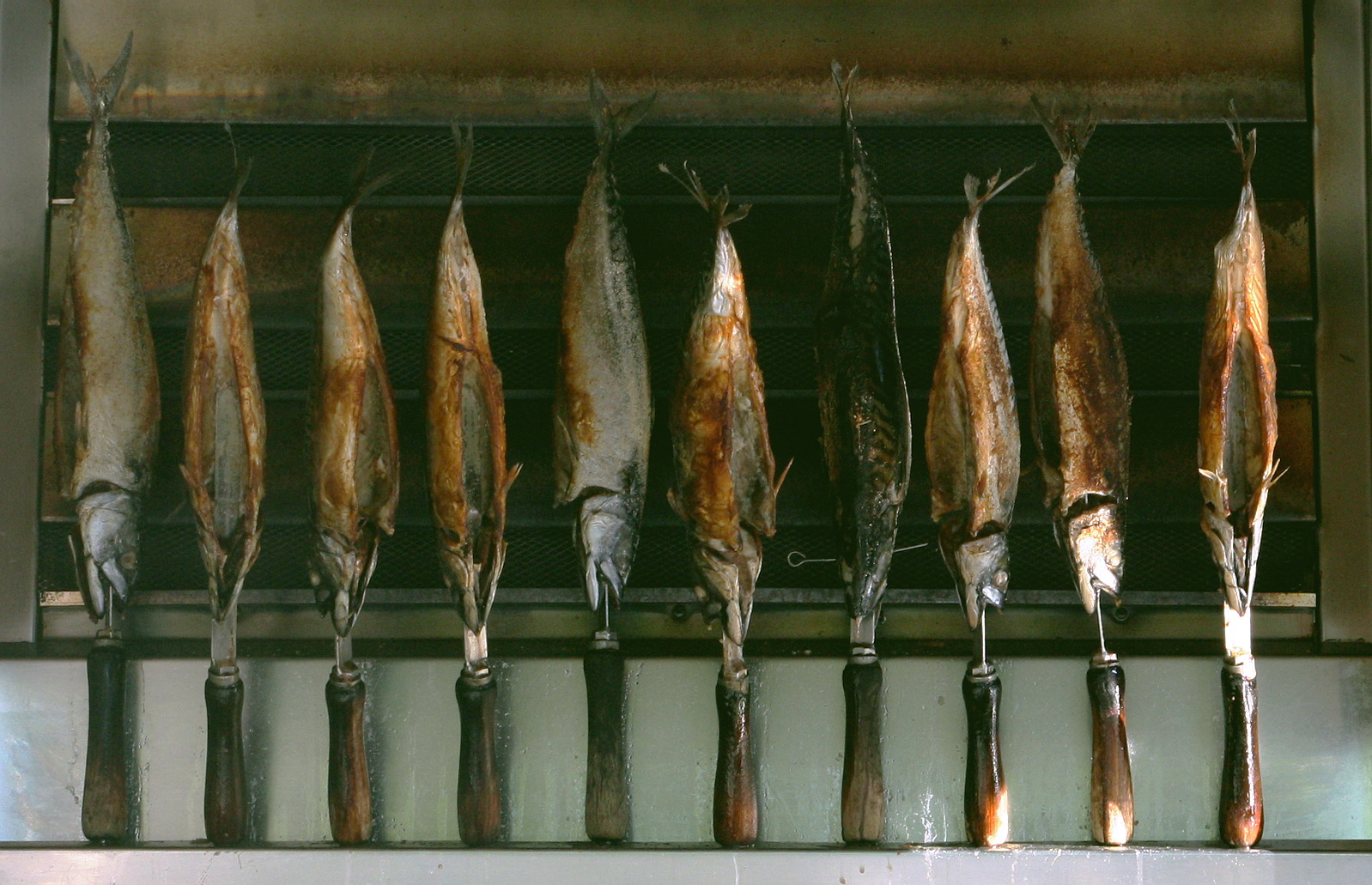
Steckerlfish made from mackerel in a beer garden
