= Schuxen =

German pastry

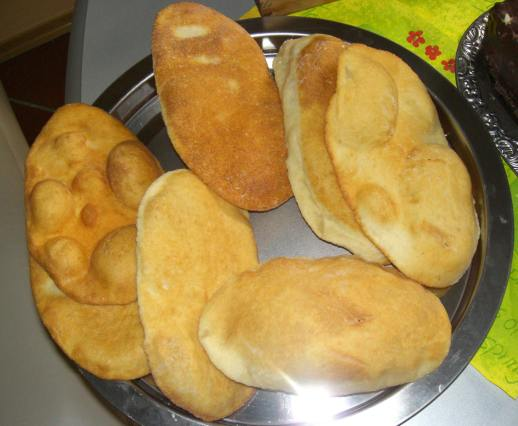
- Alternative names: Schuchsen, Schuxn
- Type: Pastry
- Place of origin: Germany
- Region or state: Bavaria
- Main ingredients: Rye flour, yeast

Schuxen (also Schuchsen or Schuxn) is an elongate fried dough pastry made from rye flour and yeast that is popular in Upper Bavaria. It is similar to Krapfen with the difference that it is not sweet.

The name possibly derives from its elongated oval shape that resembles a shoe sole (the German word is "Schuh") but this theory is questionable, as the local dialect deforms diphthongs in another way.

This name for the pastry appears in the books of Johann Andreas Schmeller, a Bavarian linguist.

In poor times the pastry served as a side dish for sauerkraut and blood or liver sausage.

In the area around Landshut, Schuxen are eaten from 24 April until Kermesse, the third Sunday in October. In the foothills of the Alps and in the Chiemgau they are eaten on Twelfth Day.

Nowadays they are rare, and few bakers produce them.

Like most fried dough dishes, they are high in caloric value.

== See also ==
- List of fried dough foods
