= Magenbrot =

Spiced biscuit

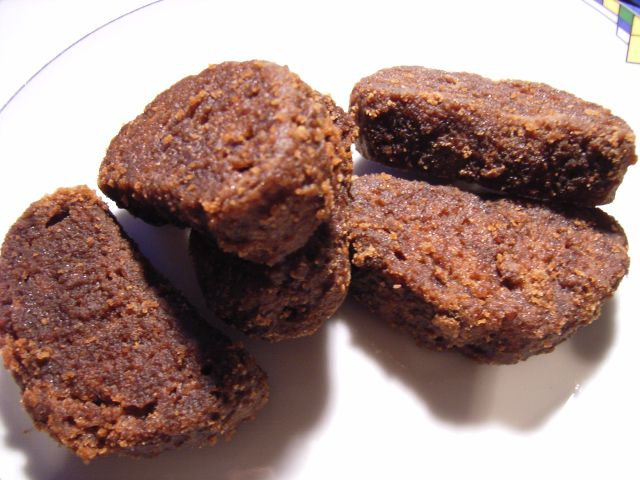
- Type: Pastry
- Region or state: Northern Switzerland, southern Germany
- Main ingredients: Cloves, cinnamon, star anise, nutmeg, cocoa, honey or sugar

Magenbrot (German: [ˈmaːɡn̩ˌbʁoːt]) is a small, sweet glazed biscuit that shares many similarities with a gingerbread cookie. The name of the dish directly translates to "stomach-bread" as it is believed to help improve digestion. This recipe first appeared in Swiss cookbooks in the late 18th century. It is usually sold in Christmas markets in northern Switzerland and southern Germany. It is known by many names including Honigkuchen, Gewürzkuchen, or Kräuterbrot.

== Appearance and composition ==
Magenbrot is known for its diamond shape and dark brown exterior in Germany, and its bread slice shape in Switzerland. This pastry is made with flour, wheat, baking soda, star anise, cinnamon, cloves, and nutmeg and sweetened using honey and sugar. Candied orange, lemon peel, and hazelnut are also added for flavoring. Some types of Magenbrot are coated with a sweet Cocoa glaze.

It is usually prepared over a period of two days. The dough is made beforehand and left for an entire night so it can settle properly. It is then separated into small pieces and baked in an oven.

Magenbrot was also previously called Alpenkräuter-Brot (Alpine herbs bread).

== See also ==
- Swiss cuisine
- German cuisine
