= Semmelknödel =

German bread dumpling

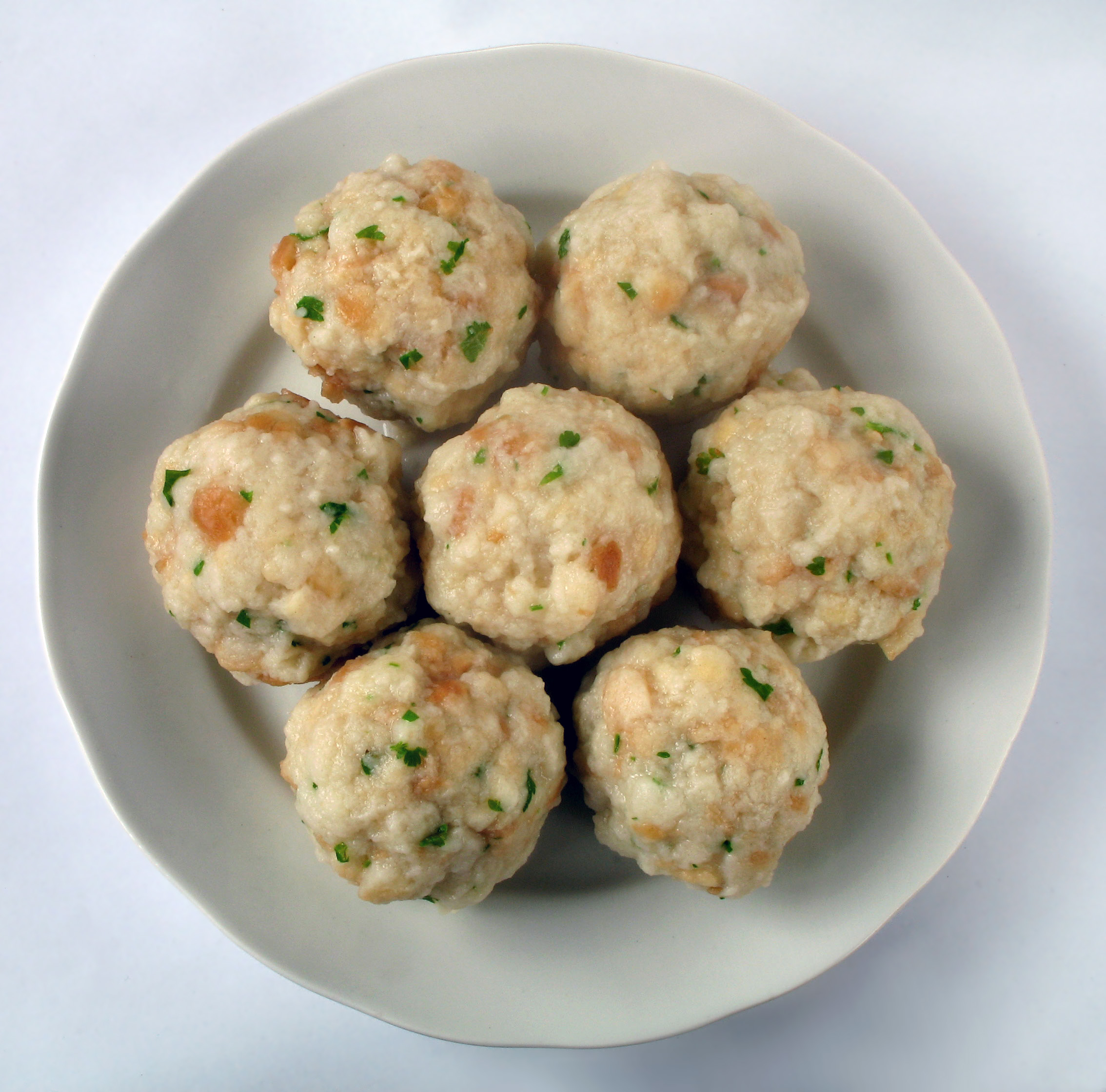
- Type: Dumpling
- Place of origin: Germany; Austria; Czech Republic; Italy
- Region or state: Central Europe
- Main ingredients: Bread, milk, eggs, parsley

Semmelknödel (German pronunciation: [ˈzɛml̩ˌknøːdl̩]) is a kind of bread dumplings made from dried wheat bread rolls like Kaiser rolls, milk, and eggs. The name derives from southern Germany, where semmel means bread rolls and knödel refers to something that has been kneaded. Semmelknödel are a food specialty in southern Germany, Austria, Slovenia and the Czech Republic, as well as northern Italy (where they are called canederli in Trentino, Semmelknödel in South Tyrol and maracund in Lombardy).

== Preparation ==
Stale (hard) white bread is cut into thin slices or cubes, and softened with hot milk. The dough is then mixed with parsley, egg, and some salt. Bread crumbs can be used to thicken the dough as this depends on how old and dried the bread rolls were. Some ingredients, especially onions, vary depending on the region where it's prepared.

== See also ==
- Austrian cuisine
- Knödel
