= Leberkäse =

Baked loaf of finely minced meat with a skin like crust on the outside

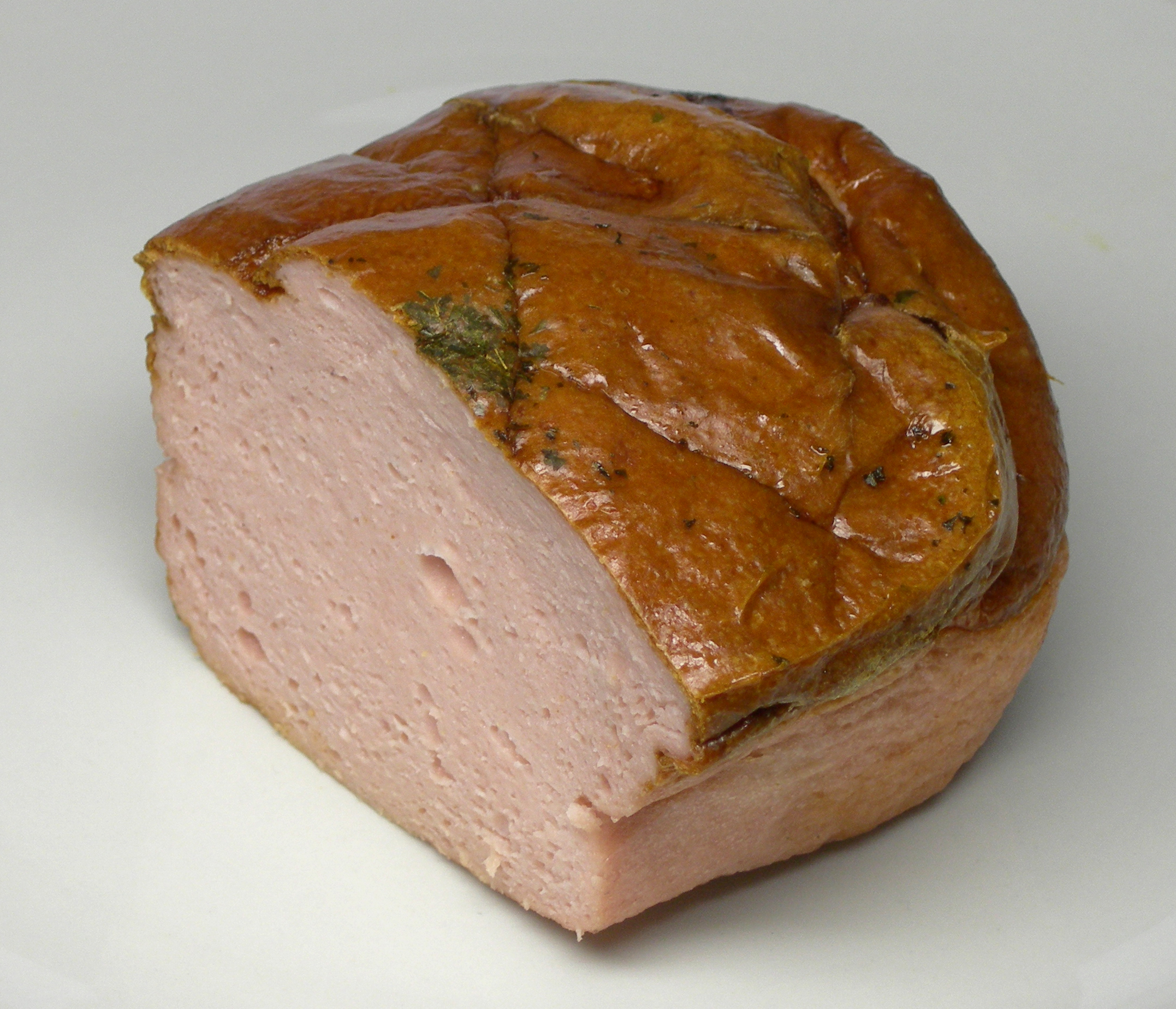
- Leberkäse
- Alternative names: Fleischkäse, Fleischlaib
- Type: Forcemeat
- Region or state: Germany, Austria, and Switzerland
- Main ingredients: Beef, pork and/or horse
- Variations: Käseleberkäse

Leberkäse (German, literally 'liver-cheese'; also Leberkäs or Lebaka(a)s) in Austria and the Swabian, Bavarian and Franconian parts of Germany, 'leverkaas' in the Netherlands and Fleischkäse ("meat-cheese"; rarely also Fleischkäs) in Saarland, Baden, Switzerland and Tyrol) is a speciality food found in the south of Germany, in Austria and parts of Switzerland. It consists of beef, pork and bacon and is made by grinding the ingredients very finely and then baking it as a loaf in a bread pan until it has a crunchy brown crust. Variations may be made using other kinds of meat such as horse meat or turkey, or may contain additional ingredients such as cheese or minced chili peppers. Liver is not traditionally considered an essential ingredient.

Leberkäse is also called Fleischlaib, which literally means "meat-loaf" in German, but it is different from the meatloaf known anglophone countries, which in German is called Hackbraten (literally "ground roast", from Hackfleisch, "ground meat", and ein Braten, "a roast"), faschierter Braten (literally "minced roast", from faschieren, "to mince", and ein Braten, "a roast"), Wiegebraten, falscher Hase ("false hare" or "faux hare") and Heuchelhase ("mock-hare").

== Consumption ==
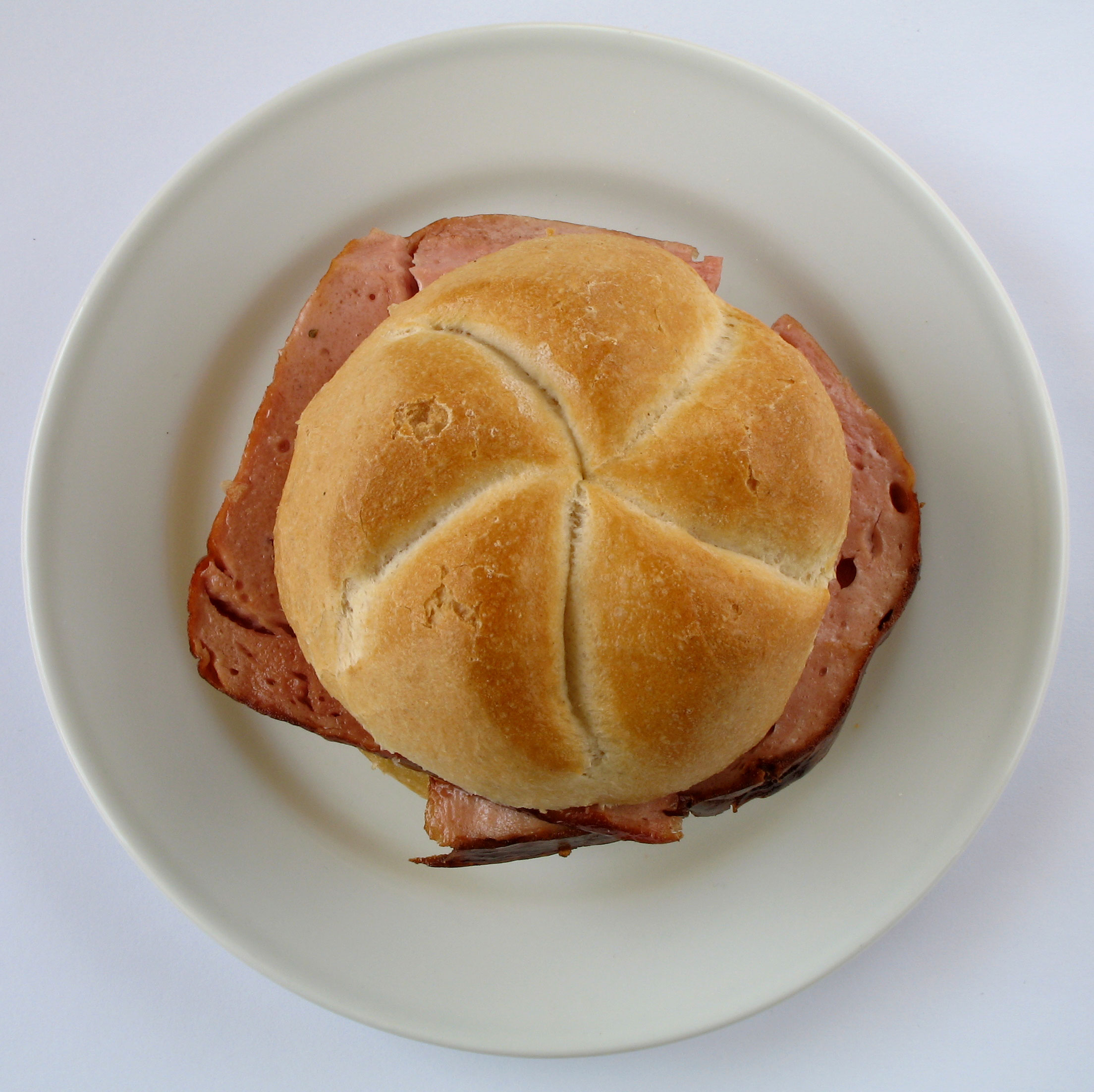
Leberkäswecken

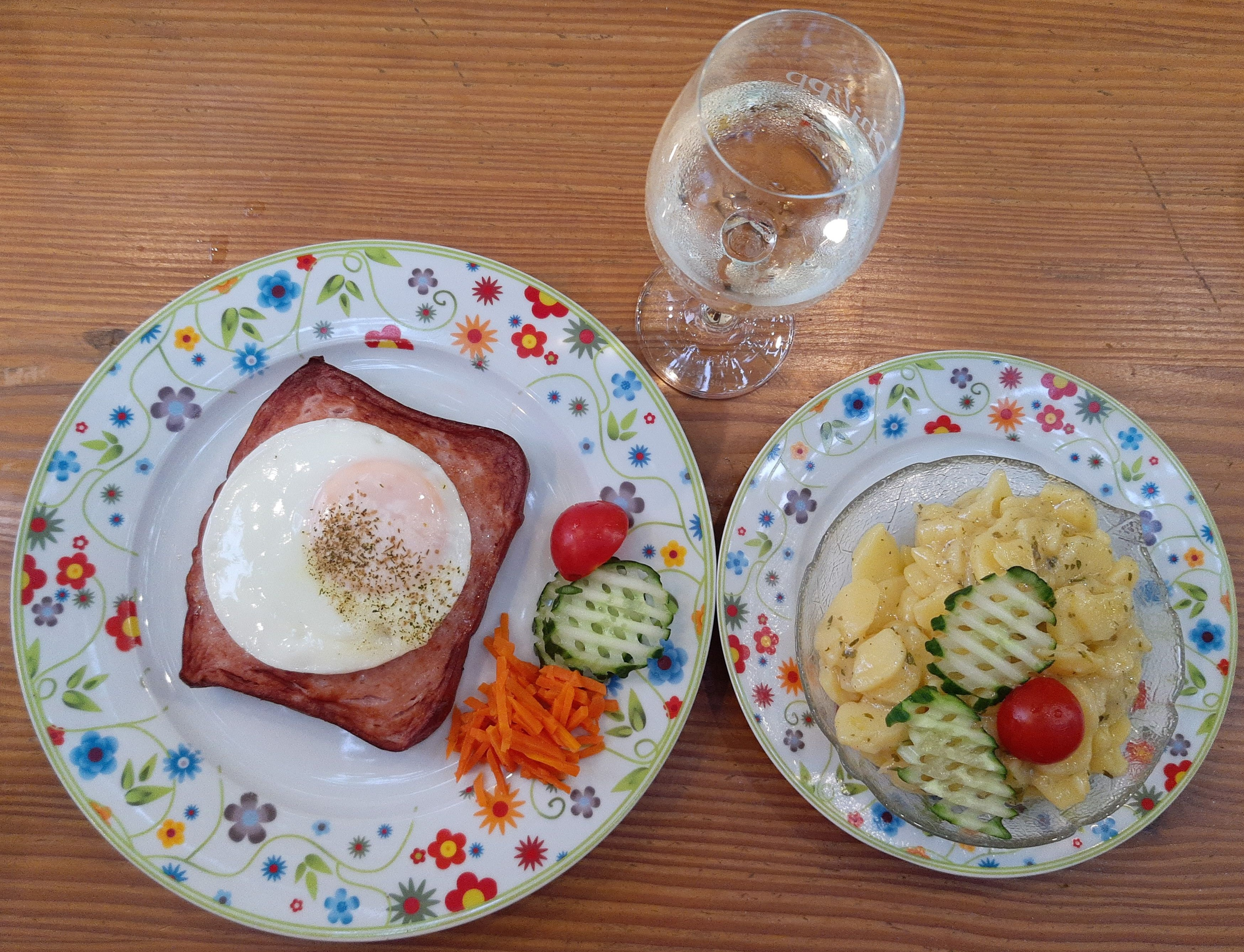
Leberkäse with a fried egg and potato salad

Leberkäse is traditionally enjoyed in a variety of ways, including:

- Most of the time, it is served hot on a Semmel (hard wheat flour bread-roll) and traditionally seasoned with mustard or pickles. The result, generally called Leberkäsesemmel (in Swabia and the Franconian parts of Bavaria, Leberkäsweckle, Leberkäsweggla or LKW in short, an allusion to the abbreviation for Lastkraftwagen, heavy goods vehicle), is a staple of Southern German and Austrian fast food stalls, butcher shops and supermarkets.
- Cut into approximately finger-thick slices, usually served with traditionally medium hot mustard or Bavarian sweet mustard or sometimes ketchup and accompanied by soft pretzels or Kartoffelsalat (potato salad).
- Pan-fried (abgebräunt or gebraten, "browned"), in which case it is commonly accompanied by a fried egg and German potato salad, or Bratkartoffeln (home fries) and sometimes spinach. This is a very common Biergarten dish.
- Cold, cut into very thin slices and used on a variety of sandwiches, usually seasoned with pickled cucumbers.
- Two slices of Leberkäse with a slice of ham and cheese in the middle are dipped into eggs and coated with breadcrumbs and then fried in the pan. This variant is called falsches Cordon Bleu ("mock Cordon Bleu").

== Variants ==
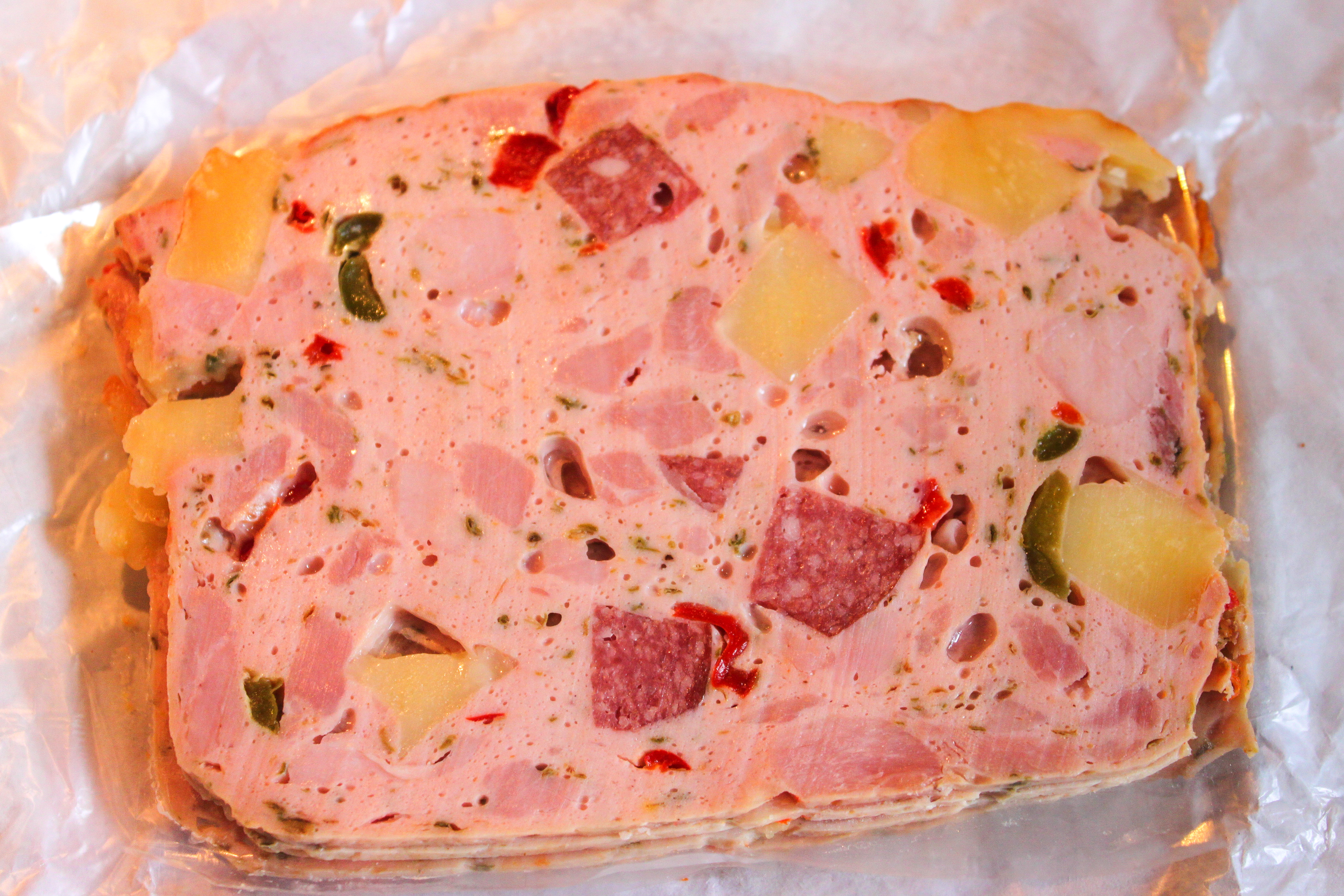
Pizzaleberkäse

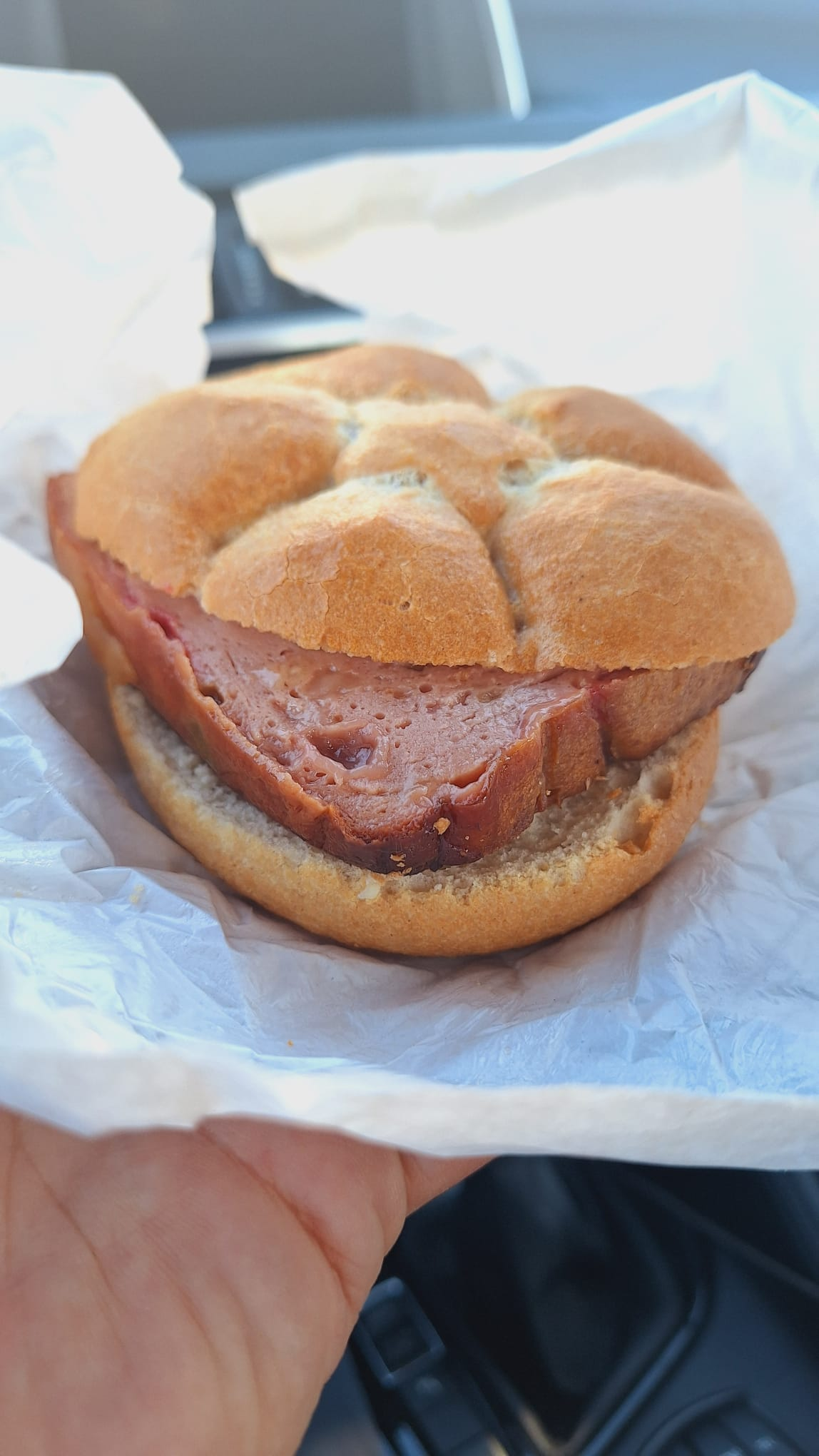
Leberkäsesemmel

Known variants include:

- Käseleberkäse, which adds small pieces of evenly distributed cheese to the mix.
- Paprika-Leberkäse (German Paprika = bell pepper), which adds small pieces of pickles and bell peppers.
- Pizzaleberkäse, which adds cheese, cut bell peppers, pickles and small cubes of salami, named for its similarity to pizza.
- Pferdeleberkäse (German Pferd = horse), which is indeed made of horsemeat (German Pferdefleisch), otherwise not widely consumed in the German language area. It is occasionally found in places such as Vienna, Austria.
- Zwiebelleberkäse (German Zwiebel = onion), which is made with onions. Common in the Swabian and Franconian regions of Germany.
- Pikanter Leberkäse, which adds spices and is very common in Austria.
