= Obatzda =

Bavarian cheese specialty

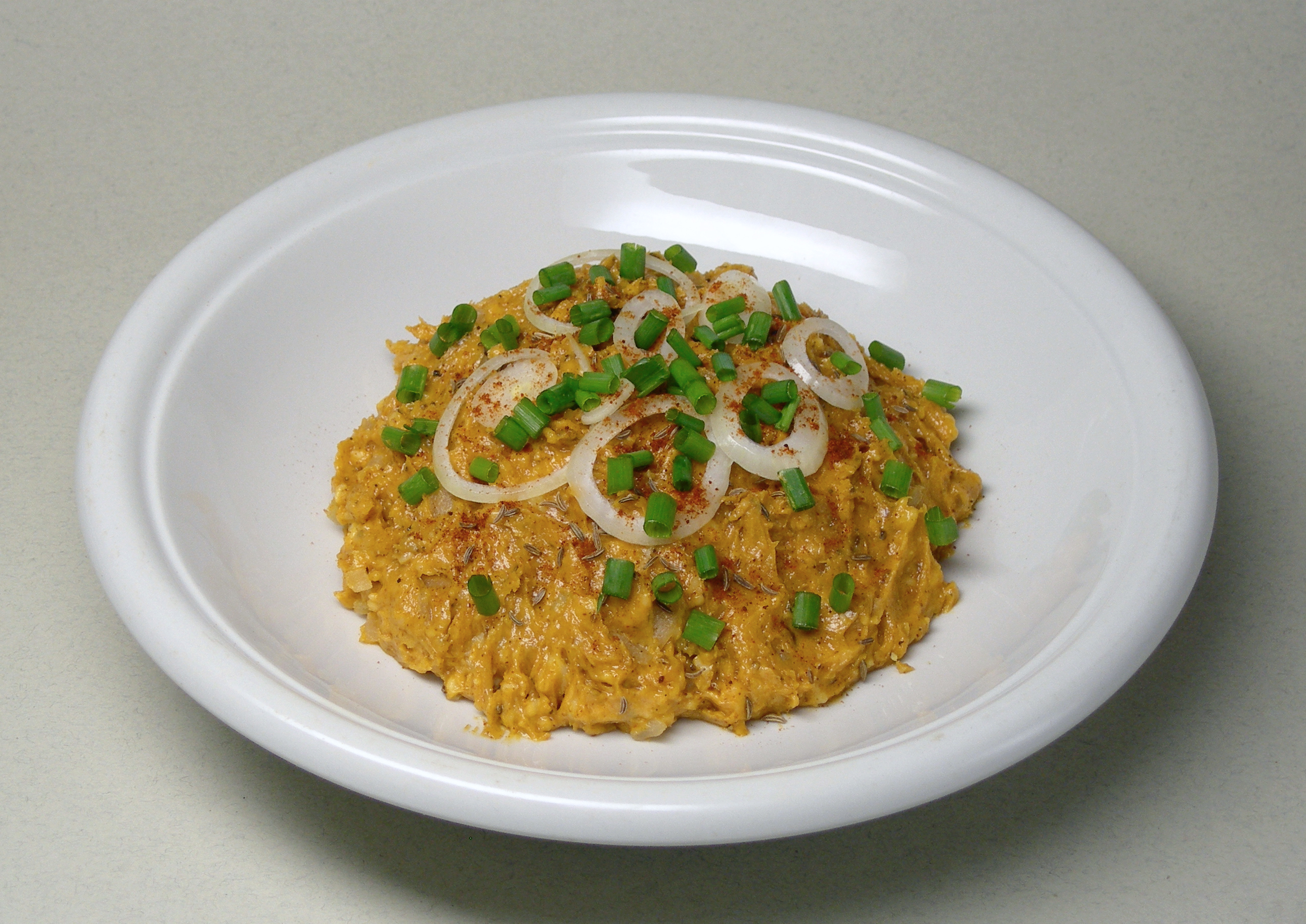
- A plate of obatzda, garnished with white and green onion
- Place of origin: Germany
- Region or state: Bavaria
- Main ingredients: Aged soft cheese (usually Camembert), butter, paprika powder,
- Ingredients generally used: salt, pepper, beer
- Variations: Liptauer

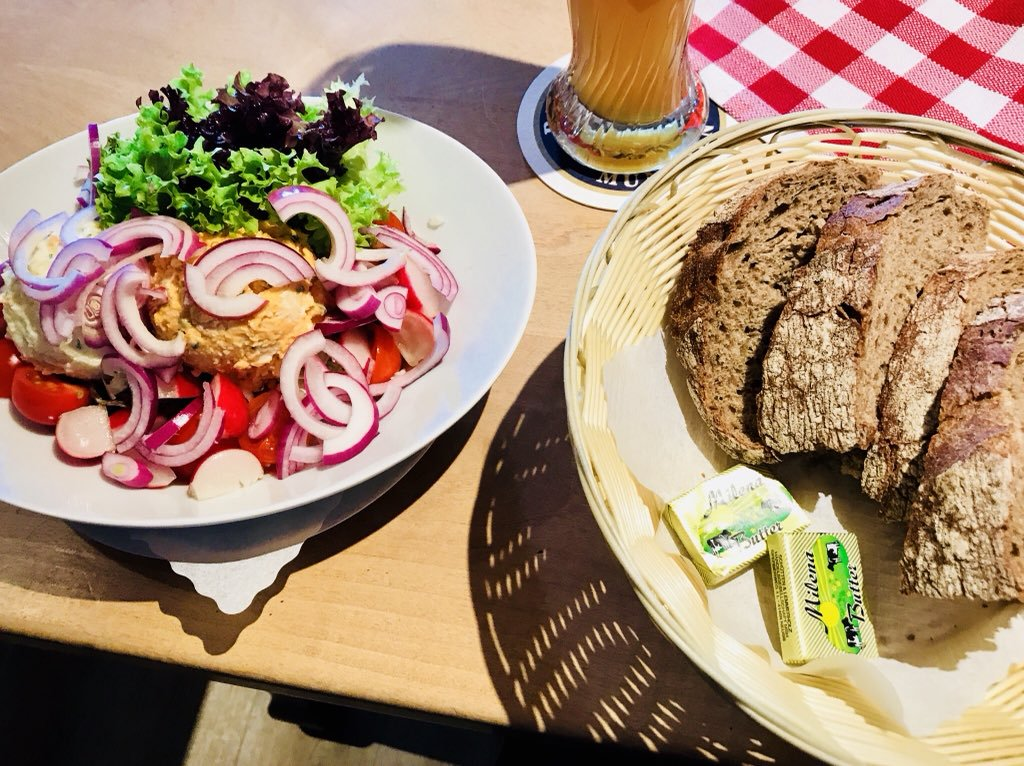
Obatzda in a Paulaner pub

Obatzda pronounced [ˈoːbatsdɐ] (also spelt Obazda, Obatza, and Obatzter) is a Bavarian cheese spread. It is prepared by mixing two parts aged soft cheese, usually Camembert (Romadur or similar cheeses may be used as well), and one part butter. Sweet or hot paprika powder, salt and black pepper are the traditional seasonings, as well as a small amount of beer. An optional amount of onions, garlic, horseradish, cloves and ground or roasted caraway seeds may be used and some cream or cream cheese as well. The cheeses and spices are mixed together into a more or less smooth mass according to taste. It is usually eaten spread on bread or pretzels. Obatzda is a classic example of Bavarian biergarten food.

A similar Austrian/Hungarian/Slovak recipe is called Liptauer, which uses fresh curd cheese as a substitute for the soft cheeses and the butter, but uses about the same spice mix.

In 2015, within the EU, obatzda was granted PGI certification.

== See also ==
- Fromage fort
- German cuisine
- List of German cheeses
- List of cheeses
- List of spreads
