= List of German dishes =

Dishes found in German cuisine

Below is a list of dishes found in German cuisine.

== Famous dishes ==
Name	Image	Region	Description
Aachener Printen		Aachen	A type of gingerbread that is typical for the city of Aachen.
Apfelkuchen		Throughout Germany	A pastry consisting of sliced apples
Bratkartoffeln		Throughout Germany	Fried potato slices, often with diced bacon or onions
Bratwurst		Throughout Germany	Sausage that is usually composed of veal, pork or beef. It is a traditional German sausage. Not to be confused with curry wurst.
Currywurst		Berlin, Rhine-Ruhr	This large-format, fried or grilled wiener is cut into thick slices and seasoned with spicy ketchup and generous amounts of curry powder, usually served with french fries – a popular snack originating in early 1950s Berlin. Both Bockwurst-style (i.e. intended to be boiled) and Bratwurst-style (i.e. intended to be grilled or fried) sausages are used, depending on region, and the use of one or the other is a matter for much debate among Currywurst gourmets. Currywurst remains one of the most popular fast foods in Germany, especially in Berlin and the Rhine-Ruhr area, but the Döner kebab is gaining rapidly in popularity.
Fischbrötchen		Northern Germany	Sandwich made with various fish (pickled or fried) and onions, common in Northern Germany, particularly along the coast
Hendl		Austro-Bavarian	Whole grilled chicken marinated with pepper and other spices this dish is known as Brathühnchen, Brathähnchen, and in eastern Germany, also as Broiler.
Hasenpfeffer			A stew made from marinated rabbit
Kartoffelsalat		Northern Germany and South Germany	Potato salad, which comes in many varieties, for example in a cream or mayonnaise dressing (northern Germany) or even in meat broth (south Germany), is often served as a side dish to Bratwurst or boiled sausages).
Knödel (also known as Kloß, depending on region)		Throughout Germany	Dumplings of various styles: Semmelknödel: dumplings made of bread crumbs; Rohe Kartoffelknödel: dumplings made of potatoes not cooked prior to forming and boiling the Knödel; Gekochte Kartoffelknödel: dumplings made from potatoes cooked prior to forming and boiling the Knödel; Halb-und-halb Kartoffelknödel: half the potatoes are cooked first, the other half are not; Halbseidene
Königsberger Klopse		East-Prussian: city of Königsberg	Cooked meatballs served in a white cream sauce with capers, with a slightly sweet and sour flavour.
Kohlroulade		Throughout Germany	Cabbage rolls
Marzipan		Throughout Germany	E.g. Lübeck-style, widely used in Christmas specialities
Pellkartoffel		Throughout Germany	Boiled or steamed potatoes before peeling (young potatoes may be eaten unpeeled), served with Quark and linseed oil, butter, or as a side dish with herring).
Pfefferpotthast		Westphalia	A traditional peppered beef stew that belongs to the cuisine of Westphalia.
Rinderroulade		Throughout Germany	A roulade of bacon and onions wrapped in thinly sliced beef in brown gravy
Sauerbraten		Rhineland	A beef pot roast marinated in vinegar, water, spices and seasonings
Sauerkraut		Throughout Germany	Fermented shredded cabbage
Schweinshaxe			Pork hock served grilled and crispy with Sauerkraut or boiled as Eisbein
Spanferkel		Throughout Germany	A grilled whole young pig, usually eaten in a large company of friends or guests
Speckpfannkuchen			Large, thin pancakes with diced, fried bacon
Spätzle		Southern Germany	A style of hand-made noodles that are an important ingredient of several dishes, such as Linsen mit Spätzle or Käsespätzle.
Stollen		Dresden	A bread-like cake with dried citrus peel, dried fruit, nuts, and spices such as cardamom and cinnamon; it is usually eaten during the Christmas season as Weihnachtsstollen or Christstollen. The best-known Stollen is from Dresden and is sold at the Striezelmarkt Christmas market, which derives its name from the cake.
Weihnachtsgans		Throughout Germany	A roast goose is a popular dish on Christmas Day.

=== Baden-Württemberg ===
Name	Image	Type	Description
Maultaschen		Main course	Noodle filled with various ingredients, such as meat, spinach, onions, and spices. Maultaschen are either served in broth or cut into slices and fried with eggs.
Brenntar		Main course	It is made of roasted flour called Musmehl, usually spelt flour or oat flour. It is usually cooked like a porridge with water and milk with various ingredients.
Sauerbraten		Main course	A vinegar-marinated roast traditionally made of horse meat, although nowadays usually made with beef.
Filderkraut		Side dish	A finely cut pointed white cabbage that has been fermented by lactic acid bacteria.
Spätzle		Pasta	A kind of soft egg pasta found in the cuisines of southern Germany and Austria, Switzerland, Hungary, Moselle, and South Tyrol.
Linsen mit Spätzle		Main course	Hearty dish that combines Spätzle with cooked lentils and Vienna sausages.
Schupfnudel		Dumpling	A noodle-like dumpling made from potatoes and flour, often served with sauerkraut.
Flädlesuppe		Entree	A broth with thin strips of German-style pancakes.
Springerle		Snack	Cookies made by pressing dough into intricate molds. Commonly used for dunking into a drink, as they are quite hard.
Zwiebelkuchen		Main course	An onion cake, a seasonal dish served around October, usually eaten while still warm and accompanied by slightly fermented red or white grape juice called Süser or (more commonly in other regions) Federweißer.
Flammkuchen		Main course	A pizza-like dish with thin crust and onion, bacon and crème fraîche topping.
Gaisburger Marsch		Main course	A stew made of meat, potatoes, Spätzle and several kinds of vegetables like potatoes and carrots.
KäseSpätzle		Main course	Dish of Spätzle and fried onions gratinated with cheese.
Wibele		Snack	Small, sweet biscuits.
Himbeergeist		Beverage	A raspberry Geist produced mainly in Germany and the Alsace region of France.
Kirschwasser		Beverage	A clear, colorless fruit brandy traditionally made from double distillation of morello cherries, a dark-colored cultivar of the sour cherry.

=== Bavaria ===
Name	Image	Type	Description
Bierwurst		Coldcuts	A German cooked, smoked Brühwurst sausage originally from Bavaria, with a garlicky flavor and dark red color. It is seasoned with black peppercorns, paprika, and mustard seeds for flavor.
Blutwurst		Coldcuts	A type of blood sausage originating in Bavaria.
Brotzeit		Main course	A traditional savory snack native to Bavaria, literally meaning "bread time".
Weißwurst		Snack	Lt.:'White sausages'; a speciality from Munich, traditionally eaten for second breakfast. Always accompanied by sweet mustard, pretzels, and wheat beer. Traditionally not served after noon because in earlier days, before fridges, the sausages had to be consumed before noon so that they didn't spoil. Today they are also eaten for dinner or lunch.
Weizenbier		Beverage	A beer, usually top-fermented, which is brewed with a large proportion of wheat relative to the amount of malted barley. The two main varieties are Weissbier and Witbier; the minor types include Lambic, Berliner Weisse and Gose.
Helles		Beverage	A beer style that is usually drunk in Bavaria. It has a yellow, gold color, and has 4.5-6% alcohol.
Radler		Beverage	A beer mixed with citrus lemonade
Kartoffelkäse		Side dish	A spread from the regions of Bavaria and Austria that literally means "potato cheese".
Münchener Bier		Beer	A protected geographical indication for beer since 1998, which is brewed within the city limits of Munich by the breweries Augustiner Bräu, Spaten-Franziskaner-Bräu, Hacker-Pschorr, Paulaner, Hofbräu and Löwenbräu, which are members of the Münchner Brauereien.
Schweinsbraten		Main course	Sliced pork roast with a crunchy crust that was boiled in a pot.
Schweinshaxe		Main course	Braised pork leg with a crunchy brown crust on the outside, and a moist and juicy inside. Served with gravy and Klöße.
Leberkäse		Snack	A type of sausage baked in a mould and cut into slices. When eaten as a main course, it is sliced and served with an egg (must be sunny side up style), and mashed potatoes. For a quick lunch, it is usually eaten in a bread-roll with mustard, a bit like a hot dog.
Leberknödel		Soup	A traditional dish of German, Austrian and Czech cuisines that literally means "Liver dumpling soup".
Schlachtschüssel		Snack	Lt.: Butchers plate; a combination of Blutwurst and Leberwurst (blood sausage and liver sausage), served hot on sauerkraut.
Saures Lüngerl		Main course	A ragout from lung and sometimes veal heart.
Bayrisch Kraut		Side dish	Shredded cabbage that is cooked in beef stock with pork lard, onion, apples, and seasoned with vinegar.
Kartoffelsalat		Side dish	Bavarian potato salad is usually made with broth, bacon bits and onions and may be served hot or chilled.
Pichelsteiner		Main course	A stew made from various kinds of meat and vegetables.
Bayrisch Creme		Dessert	A very light, fluffy, and not too sweet dessert made from gelatin, milk, cream, egg yolk, and sugar.
Prinzregententorte		Cake	A cake that consists of seven thin cake layers with chocolate buttercream in between.
Topfenstrudel		Cake	Similar to Apfelstrudel, but filled with topfen instead, and served with vanilla sauce.
Dampfnudel		Main course	A steamed bun made of yeast dough served with various toppings, e.g. sugar, cinnamon, poppy seeds, jam, butter, or vanilla sauce.
Buchteln		Main course	Sweet dumplings made of yeast dough, filled with jam, poppy seed paste, or curd, and baked in a large pan so that they stick together. The traditional Buchtel is filled with plum jam. Buchteln are topped with vanilla sauce, powdered sugar, or eaten plain and warm.
Obatzda		Side dish	A Bavarian cheese delicacy that is prepared by mixing two thirds aged soft cheese, usually Camembert (Romadur or similar cheeses may be used as well), and one third butter.
Limburger		Cheese	A cheese that originated during the 19th century in the historical Duchy of Limburg, which is now divided between Belgium, Germany, and the Netherlands. The cheese is especially known for its strong smell caused by the bacterium Brevibacterium linens.
Tafelspitz		Side dish	A boiled veal or beef in broth, served with a mix of minced apples and horseradish. It is a classic dish of the Viennese cuisine and popular throughout Austria and the neighboring German state of Bavaria.

=== Berlin ===
Name	Image	Type‡	Description
Akvavit		Beverage	A distilled spirit that is principally produced in Scandinavia, where it has been produced since the 15th century. Akvavit is distilled from grain and potatoes, and is flavoured with a variety of herbs. Akvavit is also popular in Germany and the American Midwest.
Berliner Luft		Beverage	A type of mint liqueur produced in Berlin.
Beamtenstippe		Sauce	A either white or brown sauce that is eaten with potatoes.
Berliner Weisse		Beer	A cloudy, sour beer of around 3% alcohol by volume. It is a regional variation on the white beer style from Northern Germany, dating back to at least the 16th century.
Buletten		Main course or snack	A kind of meatball in Berlin.
Currywurst		Snack	A hot pork sausage served either with curry ketchup or a tomato paste with curry powder.
Dinkelbrot		Bread	The name for a bread made in Germany from at least 90% spelled malt products or spelt.
Eierkuchen		Main course	A generally thicker pancake than a French-style crêpe and usually served with sweet or, occasionally, savory fillings.
Eisbein		Main course	Ham hock usually served with pea purée and Sauerkraut.
Hackepeter		Snack	Raw ground pork or mett that is spiced with salt and pepper, garlic and caraway.
Berliner Pfannkuchen		Pastry	Sweet dough dumplings, fried in fat or oil, filled with jam and glazed with confectioner's sugar. Also known simply as "Berliner" or, in the eastern part of Germany, including Berlin itself, "Pfannkuchen" and in Bavaria, they are called "Krapfen".

=== Bremen and Lower Saxony ===
Name	Image	Type	Description
Birnen, Bohnen und Speck		Main course	A stew of pears, green beans and bacon, invariably accompanied by potatoes.
Bratwurst		Snack	A grey sausage with veal content that has a mild flavor, is pan-fried and then eaten with a hard roll.
Braunschweiger		Snack	An internationally known sausage that is spread on toast or used in sandwiches.
Bregenwurst		Snack	A specialty sausage, usually served with Grünkohl
Bremer Kükenragout		Main course	A ragout made from different kinds of meat and seafood as well as vegetables; may contain no chicken and if it does it's meat from very young chicken.
Brunswick Mum		Beverage	An ancient beer from Brunswick.
Butterkuchen		Cake	A sheet cake made from yeast dough topped with blops of butter and sugar sometimes with sliced almonds
Calenberger Pfannenschlag		Snack	Groats that are broiled and eaten with potatoes or on bread with various other side dishes, e.g. pickles or red beet; special kind of Knipp.
Gose		Beverage	A top-fermented beer that originated in Goslar, Germany. It is brewed with at least 50% of the grain bill being malted wheat.
Jägermeister		Beverage	A digestive made with 56 herbs and spices at a strength of 35% alcohol by volume (61 degrees proof, or US 70 proof). It is the flagship product of Mast-Jägermeister SE, headquartered in Wolfenbüttel, south of Braunschweig, Lower Saxony, Germany.
Kassler		Main course	A slowly cooked smoked pork dish that is usually served with Knödel and Sauerkraut or potato salad.
Liverwurst		Snack	A kind of spreadable sausage like Pate made from the livers of pigs or calves with spices like marjoram .
Kluntjes		Candy	Sugar crystals that are used as sweetener for tea.
Knipp		Snack or Main course	Broiled groat sausage.
Labskaus		Snack or Main course	A dish made from corned beef, pickled herring, mashed potatoes, and beetroot, served with a fried egg and a pickled cucumber.
Mettwurst		Snack	A strongly flavored German sausage like salami, made from raw minced pork which is preserved by curing and smoking, often with garlic.
Nordseegarnelen		Snack or Main course	Prawns from the North Sea.
Pinkel mit Grünkohl		Main course	A dish made from slowly cooked kale that is served with Pinkel, a rather salty sausage.
Pottwurst		Snack	Another kind of Knipp.
Ratzeputz		Beverage	A type of spirit popular in Germany, which contains extracts and distillates of root ginger. The fresh ginger it contains is said to be beneficial to the stomach.
Räucheraal		Main course or snack	Smoked eel that is used as ingredient in various dishes.
Schlachteplatte		Snack	A dish with a variety of meats usually eaten as second breakfast.
Spargel		Side dish	White asparagus that is eaten as a delicacy, commonly with potatoes and sauce hollandaise.
Speck		Snack	An English word meaning bacon or "fat", attested since the early 17th century. This word also exists in German with the same meaning, but it normally refers to pork fat with or without some meat in it.
Steckrübeneintopf		Main course	A hearty stew made from rutabagas, carrots, and potatoes.
Welf pudding		Dessert	A sweet two-layer pudding invented by a royal chef with one layer of vanilla-based and one of wine-based pudding.
Wurstbrühe		Soup	The broth, which arises in the production of brewing and cooking sausage. At the traditional slaughterhouse, the meat and liver were also cooked in the same cauldron before the sausages, which produced a strong broth, especially when later sausages burst, which formed the basis.

=== East Prussia ===
East Prussia, as Germany's easternmost province, was very often influenced by the cuisines of its surrounding neighbours: Lithuania to the northeast, and Poland to the south. The Ukrainian borscht was adapted to the East Prussian palate, and Polish sausages were frequently found on the dinner table.

East Prussia's gastronomy also made extensive use of the abundant products from its dark, remote forests. Honey was often incorporated into recipes, and Kopskiekelwein, a fruit wine made from wild currants, was the favourite regional tipple alongside beer.

Name	Image	Type	Description
Bärenfang		Beverage	A German honey-flavoured liqueur based on vodka. It is usually called Bärenjäger in English-speaking countries also Meschkinnes (wild like a bear in Old Prussian).
Beetenbartsch		Soup	A beetroot-based soup served with sour cream (Schmand) and beef (originally from Ukraine) Similar to Borscht.
Kuttelsuppe		Soup	A lightly bound soup from tripe, usually with acidified vinegar that mentions regional spots, which is common in variants in numerous countries. Known as Fleck in East Prussia.
Königsberger Klopse		Main course	Meatballs served in a slightly sweet/sour white cream sauce with capers and eaten with potatoes.
Königsberger Marzipan		Candy	Special kind of marzipan browned under the broiler, made in Königsberg since 1555, flavoured with rose water.
Kopskiekelwein		Fruit wine	A wine made from either blackcurrants or redcurrants, and usually fermented with Burgundy yeast.
Pillkaller Machandel		Beverage	A clear liqueur known as Korn that is served in a shot glass with liver sausage and mustard.
Schwarzsauer		Soup	A type of blood soup with various spices cooked in vinegar-water.
Spirgel		Snack	The East Prussian name for fried bacon or pork belly as well as for a simple dish of diced pancetta or pork belly and onions served with boiled potatoes.
Tilsiter cheese		Cheese	A light yellow semi-hard rind-ripened cheese, created in the mid-19th century by Prussian-Swiss settlers, the Westphal family, from the Emmental valley.

=== Franconia ===
Name	Image	Type	Description
Fränkische Bratwurst		Snack	Fränkische Bratwurst is composed of beef, pork or veal and is traditionally served with sauerkraut or potato salad or simply in a breadroll. They vary greatly in size and seasoning from region to region but are often considerably thinner than the equivalents elsewhere in Germany. The best-known sausages are from Nuremberg (Nürnberg) and are recognisable by their small size and clearly visible herb seasoning. They are traditionally served as three sausages in a roll ("Drei in 'a Weckla") or six sausages on sauerkraut ("Sechs auf Kraut").
Drei im Weggla		Sandwich	A sandwich that has three items in a roll, typically three sausages or sausage pieces.
Extrawurst		Snack	A type of Austrian scalded cold cut that is moist, light colored, fine textured and made from a well-spiced mixture of beef, pork and bacon fat. In Austria, it is the most popular type of cold cut.
Kartoffelklöße		Main course	Large Klöße made from a dough consisting of raw or a combination of raw and cooked potatoes. The exact recipe is a matter of regional differences and personal belief. The best friend of pot-roasted meats or mushroom ragout.
Pressack mit Musik		Main condiment	A cold cut that originated in Europe whose name literally means "head cheese with music".
Saure Zipfel		Main course	A typical dish of the cuisine of Franconia and Upper Palatinate that consists of Bratwurst and sliced onion cooked in vinegar and usually eaten with Bavarian pretzels.
Schäufele		Main course	An entire pork (or, in some cases, lamb) shoulder roasted in a fairly cool oven over long period so that the meat is extremely tender with a crunchy crust. Seasoning is usually simple using salt, pepper and caraway. Traditionally, it is served in a dark sauce made from the roast stock, meat broth, and often dark beer and Lebkuchen spices. Accompanied by a side salad, dumplings and red cabbage, or less commonly, sauerkraut.
Stadtwurst		Snack	A type of sausage consisting of pork in a casing that may be white or red. Stadtwurst is a regional variety in Franconia and Upper Palatinate (Oberpfalz) and usually unknown and not available in other parts of Germany.
Hochzeitssuppe		Soup	A spicy wedding soup with bread dumplings, liver dumplings and finely sliced pancakes.
Lebkuchen		Pastry/Cookie	German kind of gingerbread of which the most famous originates in Nuremberg and is traditionally only available at Christmas, although tourist demand means that Lebkuchen are available in some form practically all year round.
Regensburger Wurst		Snack	A boiled sausage with a fine or coarse pork filling that comes in a compact shape with a length of about 10 cm (4 in) and a diameter of about 4 cm. It was invented in Regensburg in the second half of the 19th century and only sausages that are produced in the inner city ring may be called "Regensburger".
Weihnachtskarpfen		Main course	A traditional dish with breaded and fried carp for Christmas Eve in Central Europe.
Wickelklöße		Snack	A variant of the potato dumpling of the Erzgebirge cuisine and Thuringian cuisine filled with breadcrumbs.
Wurstsalat		Main course	A tart sausage salad prepared with distilled white vinegar, oil and onions.[1][2] A variation of the recipe adds strips of pickled gherkin.

=== Frankfurt am Main and Hessen ===
Name	Image	Type	Description
Nürnberger Rostbratwurst		Snack	The small, thin bratwurst from Franconia's largest city, Nuremberg, was first documented in 1567; it is 7 to 9 cm (2.8 to 3.5 in) long, and weighs between 20 and 25 g.
Green Sauce		Dip	A bright sauce made from an abundant amount of seven fresh minced herbs namely borage, sorrel, cress, chervil, chives, parsley, and burnet. Served with boiled potatoes and hardboiled eggs. Called "Grüne Soße" in German or "Griee Sooß" in the Hessian dialect.
Frankfurter sausage		Snack	A smoked sausage made from pure pork, which is eaten hot and usually accompanied by bread and mustard. Not to be confused with the American hot dog "Frankfurter".
Fischmilch		Main course	Milt that is fresh or preserved with salt as food and is used for flavoring sauces or used in whole fish dishes.
Apfelwein		Beverage	A wine made of apples, somewhat comparable to cider and French cidre, though drier and more sour-tasting. Best enjoyed in traditional "Äbbelwoi-Lokalen". Served from a special jug (the "Bembel"), drunk with a special glass (the "Gerippte").
Schorle		Beverage	A refreshing drink that combines apple juice with sparkling water. It is usually served during summer.
Handkäse		Cheese	A German regional sour milk cheese and a culinary speciality of Frankfurt am Main, Offenbach am Main, Darmstadt, Langen, and other parts of southern Hesse. It gets its name from the traditional way of producing it: forming it with one's own hands.
Harzer		Cheese	A German sour milk cheese made from low fat curd cheese, which contains only about one percent fat and originates in the Harz mountain region south of Braunschweig.
Mainzer Käse		Snack	A sour milk cheese, similar to the Harzer or hand cheese. It was invented in 1813 by a farmer's wife named Kaul in Groß-Gerau and sold at the weekly market in Mainz.

=== Hamburg ===
Name	Image	Type	Description
Knackwurst		Snack	A sausage type of northern German origin from the mid-16th century. The manifold available varieties depend on the geographical region of their production.
Hamburger Speck		Dessert	A type of candy made out of foamed sugar with various coatings. The colors of the candy are often the same as the colors of Hamburg's flag (red and white), with a white central square and two red outer squares.
Labskaus		Main course or snack	A dish made from corned beef, herring, mashed potatoes, and beetroot, served with a fried egg and a pickled cucumber. See also under Bremen and Lower Saxony.
Marmorkuchen		Cake	A cake with a streaked or mottled appearance (like marble) achieved by very lightly blending light and dark batter.
Birnen, Bohnen und Speck		Main course	A dish composed of pears, beans, and bacon, invariably accompanied by potatoes.
Hamburger Aalsuppe		Soup	A sweet and sour soup of eel, meat broth, dried fruits, vegetables, and herbs.
Franzbrötchen		Pastry	A pastry made from Phyllo dough, covered with sugar and powdered cinnamon that is usually eaten for breakfast. It literally means "Frenchman's roll", referring to it dating to the French occupation of Hamburg under Napoleon, and is only rarely found outside of Hamburg, Germany.
Frikadelle		Main course or snack	A type of flat meatball composed of pork, beef and onions commonly eaten with pasta salad, potatoes or simply in a bread roll with mustard or other condiments.
Hamburger Hummersuppe		Soup	A creamy lobster soup served with a small amount of whipped cream and garnished with dill.
Hamburger Krabbensuppe		Soup	A creamy shrimp soup served with a small amount of whipped cream and garnished with dill.
Heißewecken		Main course or snack	A traditional pastry that has been proven in German-speaking since the late Middle Ages and was eaten in north and northwest Germany before the beginning of the pre-Easter Lent, especially from Rose Monday to Ash Wednesday.
Krabbentoast		Main course or snack	A bread dish that is made with vegetables and shrimp.
Rote Grütze		Dessert	A jelly/jam-like dessert or summer dish made from berries especially currants that can be eaten pure, but is often accompanied by milk or vanilla sauce.

=== Mecklenburg-Vorpommern ===
Name	Image	Type	Description
Mecklenburger Rippenbraten		Main course	Rib roast, made from belly of pork including meat of the upper rib, stuffed with Boskoop apples, prunes, cinnamon, rum and zwieback, usually served with Klöße and red cabbage.
Tüffel un Plum		Main course	A potato stew made with smoked ham, prunes, potatoes and spiced with clove and bay leaves.
Fliederbeersuppe		Dessert	Dessert soup made from elderberry, served with semolina dumplings
Sahnehering		Main course	Young herring marinated in cream, with onions and sometimes pears or apples and served with Bratkartoffeln or Pellkartoffeln.
Schwedeneisbecher		Dessert	A Swedish ice cup with vanilla ice, served with apple sauce, whipped cream and a waffle, optionally with advocaat liquor.

=== Palatinate ===
Name	Image	Type	Description
Gequellde mit weißem Kees		Main course	A dish of cooked potatoes with curd cheese.
Pfälzer Leberwurst		Main course	A dried sausage in the curry and the palate, the cheese is made from cereals, as well as the shrub, salt, garments, and croissants, of the marginal downy marrow, which is breeding - a lot of peasants are typical and bred.
Saumagen		Main course	A pork's stomach that serves as casing for a filling of pork, sausage meat and potatoes. Sometimes the filling also contains eggs and carrots. The dish is usually served with mashed potatoes and sauerkraut, bread or Bratkartoffeln.
Weck, Worscht un Woi		Snack	A widespread meal with a bread roll, a sausage, and wine in the wine-growing regions of Pfalz, Rheinhessen, Hessische Bergstraße, and Rheingau, where the sausage is always enjoyed cold.
Grumbeersupp un Quetschekuche		Main course	Potato soup and plum tart
Kirschenmichel		Dessert	Kind of cherry cake or bread pudding made with cherries and usually served hot with vanilla sauce.
Zwiebelkuchen		Main course	An onion pie usually served with Federweisser.
Federweisser		Beverage	Young white wine.
Kuemmerling		Beverage	A type of Kräuterlikör (herb liqueur) from Germany, belonging to the group of Halbbitter (semi bitters).
Chestnuts		Side dish	Cooked chestnuts served with meat or other things.

=== Rhineland ===
Name	Image	Type	Description
Rheinischer Sauerbraten		Main course	Large pieces of beef or more traditionally horse meat, marinated in a spicy water-vinegar mixture for a long time before baking.
Reibekuchen		Side dish	Potato fritter with black bread, apple syrup, sugar beet syrup, or stewed apples.
Blutwurst		Snack	Blood sausage either cured or fried.
Himmel und Erde		Main course	A dish with mashed potatoes with stewed apples and fried blood pudding (Cologne) that literally means "heaven/sky and Earth". Potatoes are also called 'Erdäpfel', what means 'ground apples', so it is a meal prepared out of 'apples' which grow above and under the earth.
Halve Hahn		Snack	A dish that literally means "half cockerel", but does not actually contain rooster at all. It is a cheese sandwich with a thick slice of extra matured Gouda cheese, onions and mustard on a Röggelchen. The name is based on a wordplay (Köln).
Muscheln Rheinischer Art		Main course	Mussels cooked in wine with vegetables and served with whole wheat bread and some butter.
Killepitsch		Beverage	A herb liqueur from Düsseldorf, Germany. It is a blood red colour and is flavoured with fruits, berries, herbs, and spices. Its alcohol content is 42% by volume.
Korn		Beverage	A German colourless distilled beverage produced from fermented cereal grain seed.
Marillenschnaps		Beverage	A fruit brandy made from apricots. It is mostly produced in the Wachau region of Austria, but similar apricot brandies are produced elsewhere
Underberg		Beverage	A digestive bitter produced at Rheinberg, Germany by Underberg AG, made from aromatic herbs from 43 countries, which undergo inspections and are based on a secret Underberg family recipe whose members are personally responsible for the production of the drink.
Zwetschgenwasser		Beverage	A plum brandy obtained by distilling fermented plums.

=== Saarland ===
Name	Image	Type	Description
Dibbelabbes		Main course	A potato hash prepared from raw grated potatoes, bacon and leeks, and baked in a Dibbe, or pot, usually eaten with apple sauce.
Schwenker		Main course	Pork steaks, marinated in spices and onions and broiled on a grill that hangs on a chain over a wood fire.
Geheirate		Main course	Literally "married ones" because the dish contains both egg noodle dumplings and potatoes cooked together. It is normally served in a creamy bacon sauce or rendered diced bacon with a side of green salad or applesauce.

=== Saxony ===
Name	Image	Type	Description
Eierschecke		Cake	A cake consisting of three layers: The bottom one is either a yeast dough (Hefeteig) or one made with baking soda (Rührteig), the middle layer is a cream made of quark, vanilla and some butter, egg, sugar and milk, and the top layer is mainly made from eggs (Eier), which are beaten with butter, sugar and "Vanillepudding"-powder (starchy substance normally used to cook a dessert similar to semolina pudding).
Leipziger Allerlei		Side dish	A vegetable dish consisting of peas, baby carrots, white asparagus and morels. It may also, but not necessarily, contain broccoli, cauliflower, green beans or corn, even small prawns.
Quarkkeulchen		Main course or dessert	A sweet main dish made from quark, mashed boiled potatoes, a little flour, an egg and some grated lemon peel. The ensuing dough is baked as small, less than palm-sized pancakes and eaten hot with sugar and cinnamon, or with fruit, whipped cream, vanilla ice cream etc.
Schälklöße		Soup	A soup that consists of filled pasta and various vegetables.
Stollen		Cake	German Christmas cake of which there are two important centers in Saxony: Dresden and the Ore Mountains.
Teichelmauke		Main course	A dish that consists of mashed potatoes with bouillon and cooked beef.

Note: The cuisine of the Saxon part of the Ore Mountains is more a relative of the cuisine of Franconia than a relative of the other parts of Saxony. The cuisine of Upper Lusatia also differs from central Saxony and is more related to the (former) cuisines of Lower Silesia and Northern Bohemia.

=== Saxony-Anhalt ===
Typical for very traditional dishes from Saxony-Anhalt is the combination of bitter or hearty meat dish with sweet. Sweet pancakes in Green bean soup for example are the cause of many jokes.

Name	Image	Type	Description
Baumkuchen		Cake	A cake typical for Christmas that is considered difficult to prepare.
Magdeburger Schmalzkuchen		Pastry	Fried pastry made from yeast dough, topped with confectioner's sugar and usually consumed for carnival.
Eisbein		Main course	Ham hock that is usually served with mashed potatoes or bread and sauerkraut.
Schierker Feuerstein		Beverage	A herb liqueur.
Rotkäppchen Sektkellerei		Beverage	A brand of sparkling wine.

=== Schleswig-Holstein ===
Name	Image	Type	Description
Buttermilchsuppe		Soup	Buttermilk soup with flour dumplings
Gruenkohlgericht		Side dish	Cooked kale usually served with potatoes and Kasseler or other foods.
Kieler Sprotten		Main course	Smoked Baltic sprats.
Labskaus		Main course or snack	A dish made from corned beef, herring, mashed potatoes, and beetroot, served with a fried egg and a pickled cucumber.
Mehlbeutel		Main course	A large flour dumpling served with bacon and a sweet sauce.
Schnüüsch		Main course	A stew made of ham, potatoes and vegetables cooked in roux.
Schwarzsauer		Soup	A sort of black pudding made with vinegar.
Snuten un Poten		Main course	Cured pig snouts and trotters that are cooked in vinegar together with several spices. Traditionally served with sauerkraut, erbspüree, and hot mustard.

=== Silesia ===
When Silesia was German, the influence of neighboring countries was clear in Silesian cooking; Polish carp and cheeses, Bohemian goulash, Austrian sausage and Pfefferkuchen (pepper cakes). Schnapps was very commonly drunk with beer in Silesia. There was an old saying that went "Silesia has two principal rivers, Schnapps and the river Oder".

Name	Image	Type	Description
Schlesisches Himmelreich		Main course	A dish of pork belly with dried fruits and cinnamon that literally means "Silesian heaven".
Kartoffelsuppe		Soup	A potato soup of the traditional German and Austrian cuisine that has the main ingredient of potatoes. If the consistency is relatively viscous, then it is called a potato stew.
Weihnachtsgans		Main course	Roasted goose traditionally served with potatoes or Klöße with gravy and vegetables.
Schlesische Kartoffelklöße		Main course	Silesian potato dumplings.
Mohnkuchen		Cake	A generic term for various types of cakes, which have in common that they contain poppy seeds or the seeds of blue or gray grapes, either in the dough or in the form of a pad or filling.
Streuselkuchen		Cake	A German specialty that is traditionally made of a yeast dough and covered with a sweet crumb topping referred to as streusel.
Liegnitzer Bombe		Cake	A gingerbread specialty from Liegnitz in Lower Silesia that is a small round cake made of brown gingerbread dough with a fruit and marzipan filling.
Stonsdorfer		Beverage	A type of herb liqueur, originally made in Staniszów (Stonsdorf).

=== Thuringia ===
Name	Image	Type	Description
Thuringian sausage		Snack	Red to grey, stuffed in a natural casing of pig intestine, unlike the white Franconian variety.
Thüringer Rostbrätel		Main course	A pork neck steak marinated together with onions in beer and mustard.
Thüringer Klöße		Main course	Dumplings made of raw or cooked potatoes with pan-fried toasted bread inside.
Mutzbraten		Main course or snack	A pound of mutton, roasted on open birchwood fire, served with sauerkraut.
Rinderroulade		Main course	Beef roulades: Spread with mustard and filled with bacon, onions and (in some areas) pickled cucumber.
Käsekuchen		Cake	Cheesecake made from quark (cheese) either with or without pie crust (usually shortcrust pastry).
Schmandkuchen		Cake	A sheet cake that consists of yeast dough and a layer of fruit or quark, which in turn is covered by a layer of sour cream, pudding, or porridge. The top layer is a made of cinnamon on the sour cream cake.
Prophetenkuchen		Cake	A speciality cake from Altenburg that consists of eggs, sugar, oil, flour, and alcohol (usually rum).
Zwiebelkuchen		Cake (savoury)	A sheet cake made in Weimar from yeast dough with onions, sour cream, bacon bits and eggs.

=== Westphalia ===
Name	Image	Type	Description
Blindhuhn		Stew	A stew of the Westphalian cuisine prepared with beans, vegetables and bacon
Kassler		Side dish	The name given to a salted (cured) and slightly smoked cut of pork similar to British gammon. It can be either hotly or coldly smoked.
Knieperkohl		Main course	A pickled cabbage dish similar to sauerkraut. It contains not only white cabbage but also collard greens (or leaves of red cabbage) and kale, as well as grape leaf and cherry leaf.
Pickert		Main course	Potato pancakes
Kohlwurst		Main course	A simple, fresh, strongly smoked sausage (Rohwurst) made of lights, pork and fat, which is mostly eaten cooked with kale (cabbage) dishes.
Westphalian ham		Snack	A hearty and smoked ham from Westfalen that is very aromatic.
Möpkenbrot		Snack	A kind of blood sausage that contains rye bread, pig-blood, milk, eggs, fat, salt, and pepper.
Pfefferpotthast		Main Course	A meat dish consisting of beef, lard, onions, and spices, cooked in a pot; and served with boiled potatoes and salad in the summer, and pickled cucumbers and beetroot in the winter.
Rump steak		Main course	Roast beef served with various sides such as potato wedges and vegetables.
Pumpernickel		Bread	A hearty bread; it goes black because the sugar in the bread goes to caramel.
Herrencreme		Dessert	A gentleman's creme that consists of vanilla jelly with cream and rum.
Spanish fricco		Stew	A hearty Westphalian stew prepared primarily using diced beef, potatoes and onions, typically in a cream soup base
Stippgrütze		Snack	Barley groats cooked in sausage juices (Wurstbrühe), which are enriched with pieces of meat, offal, such as heart, kidney or liver and seasoned with spices and salt. The cooked ingredients are minced after the juices have been poured off and a crumbly cake is left which is held together with fat and which sets on cooling.

== See also ==
- German cuisine
- German fries
- List of German cheeses
- List of German desserts
- List of German soups
