= Schweinshaxe =

German roasted pork dish

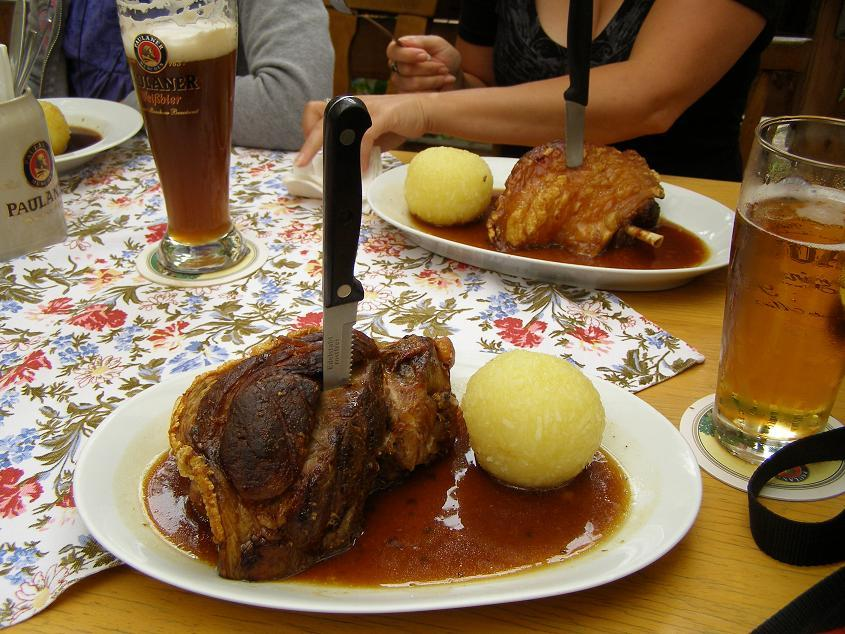
Schweinshaxe with Kartoffelknödel (potato dumplings) in Germany

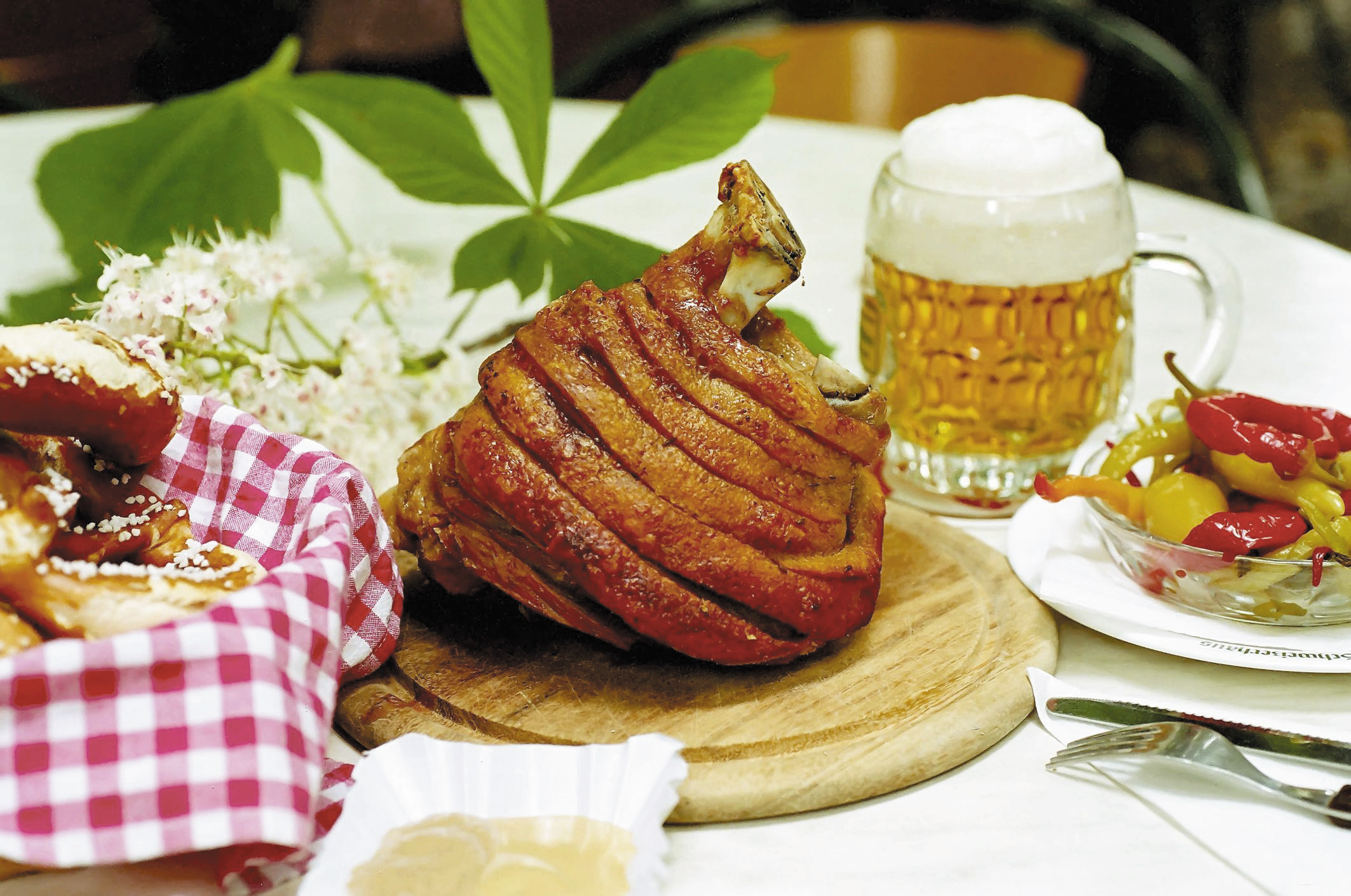
Roasted Austrian-style Stelze

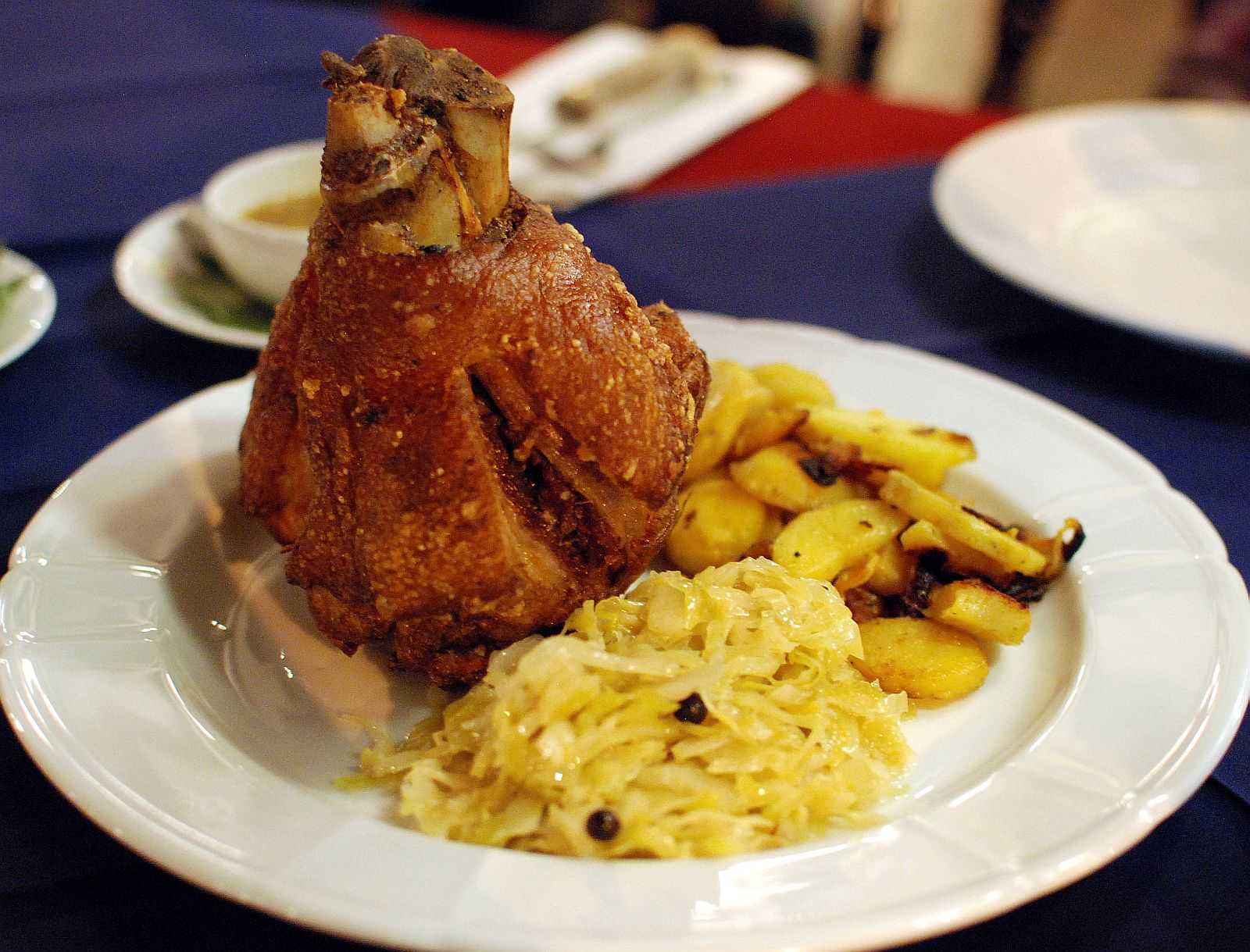
Schweinshaxe served with Bratkartoffeln (fried potatoes) and Sauerkraut at a Bavarian restaurant in Chiang Mai, Thailand

Schweinshaxe (German pronunciation: [ˈʃvaɪnshaksə]; literally 'swine's hock'), in German cuisine, is a roasted ham hock (or pork knuckle). The ham hock is the end of the pig's leg, just above the ankle and below the meaty ham portion. It is especially popular in Bavaria as Schweinshaxn (pronounced [ˈʃvaɪnshaksn̩]) or Sauhax(n) ([ˈsao̯haks(n̩)]). A variation of this dish is known in parts of Germany as Eisbein, in which the ham hock is pickled and usually slightly boiled.

Schweinshaxe is one of the formerly typical peasant foods, in which recipes were composed to make inexpensive and tough cuts of meat more palatable (cf. for beef the popular Sauerbraten). Such inexpensive cuts usually require long periods of preparation; the meat is sometimes marinated for days, and in the case of big cuts up to a week. The Schweinshaxe is then roasted at low temperatures, typically—depending on size—for two to three hours.

The most popular side dishes are potatoes and cabbage variations. The Bavarian version is classically served with potato dumplings and red cabbage, or with sauerkraut and potatoes.

The Austrian version of this dish is called Stelze ([ˈʃtɛltsə]) or in dialect Stötzn/Stelzn ([ˈʃtœˑtsn̩]). It is usually marinated or pre-boiled in a caraway seed and garlic brine, roasted until the skin is crisp, and served with mustard, horseradish, and pickled chili peppers.

== See also ==
- Eisbein
- List of ham dishes
- List of German dishes
