= Blindhuhn =

Westphalian vegetable and bacon stew

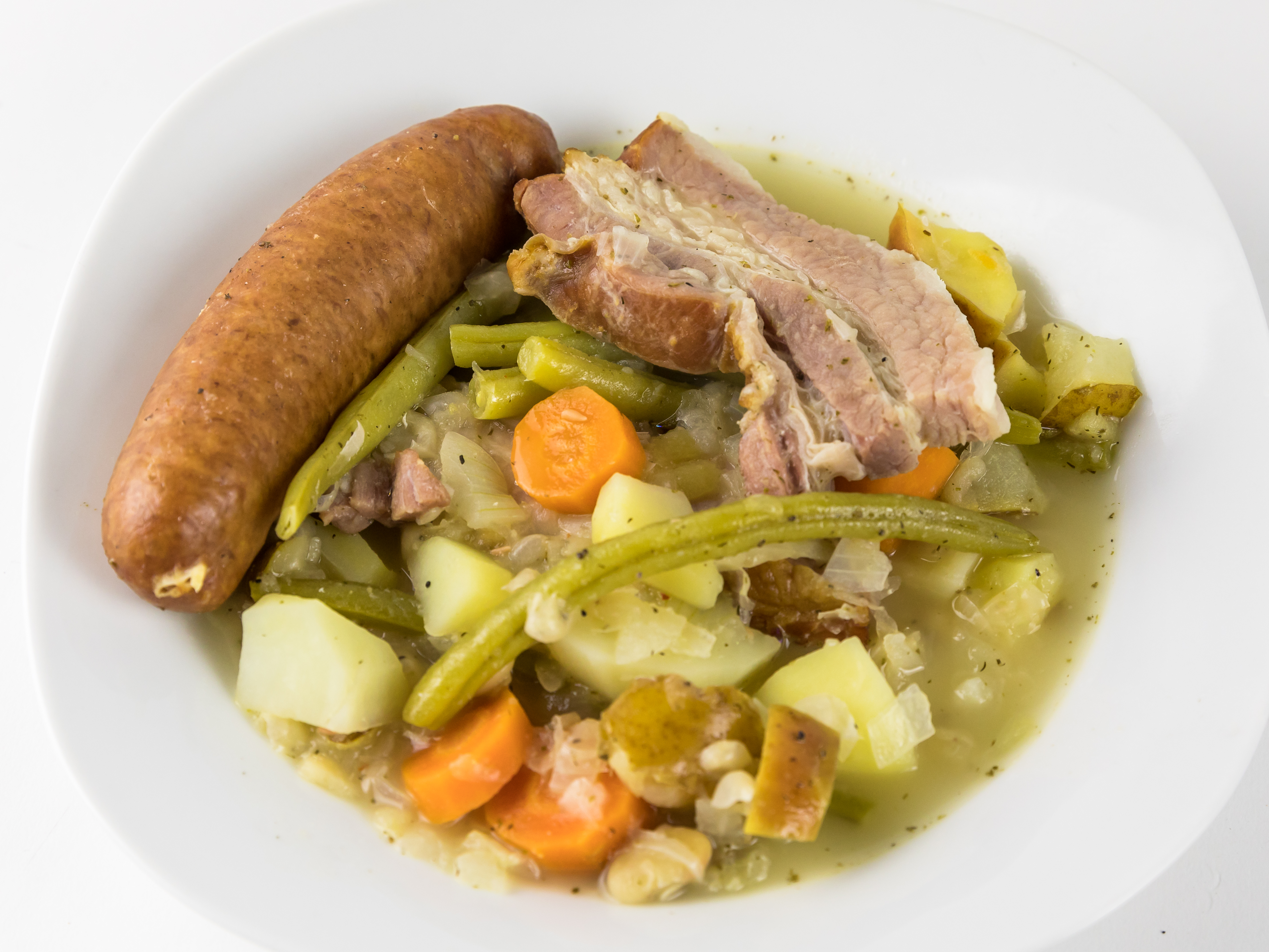
Westphalian blindhuhn stew with sides of mettwurst sausage and bacon

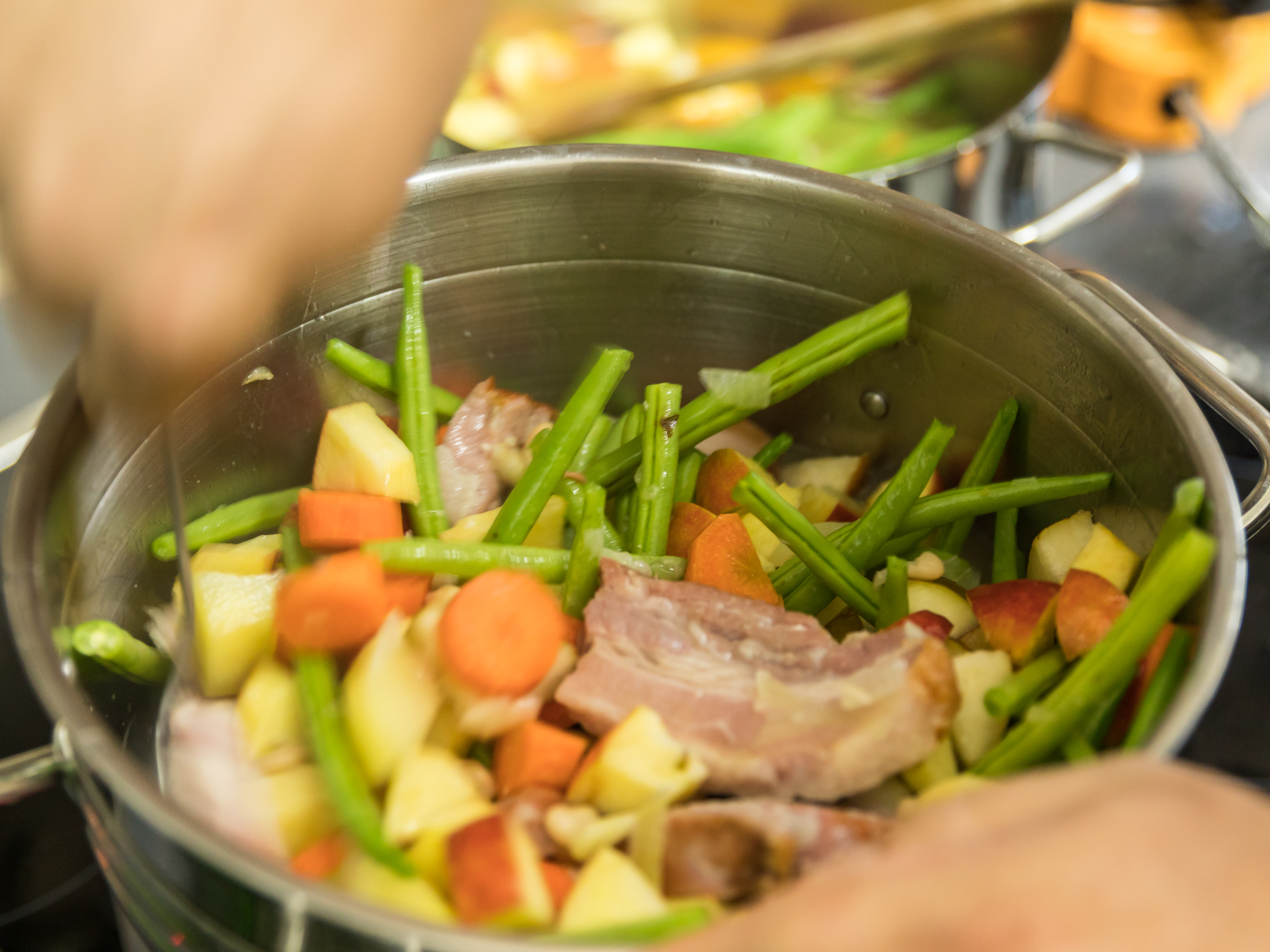
Blindhuhn being prepared

Blindhuhn (German pronunciation: [ˈblɪntˌhuːn], lit. 'blind chicken'; also called blindes huhn [ˈblɪndəs huːn], Westphalian blind chicken, Lippisches blind chicken or goose feed) is a stew that is part of Westphalian cuisine in Germany. It is a hearty dish is prepared from various beans, potatoes, carrots, pears and apples as well as bacon. Depending on how it is prepared, it has a soupy to creamy consistency and is slightly acidic per to the addition of apples and vinegar. Despite its name, the dish contains no chicken.

In some preparations, unsmoked or smoked mettwurst sausage is added at the end and also cooked. Fried onion is sometimes used to top the dish.

== Etymology ==
Westfälisches blindhuhn ("Westphalian blind chicken") is a classic recipe from Westphalian cuisine that Henriette Davidis described as the "Westphalian national dish" as early as the mid-19th century. A German proverb states that "even a blind hen finds a grain", and the stew's name is derived from this, essentially meaning that everyone will find something they like in this stew. Davidis herself also describes the dish as a gleaning, so that the proverb can also mean that it is an autumn dish that is stocked with the remains of the garden season that the cook found as a "blind chicken". The composition of the dish is reminiscent of the North German dish Birnen, Bohnen und Speck ("pears, beans and bacon").

== See also ==
- List of German dishes
- List of stews
