= Königsberger Klopse =

German dish

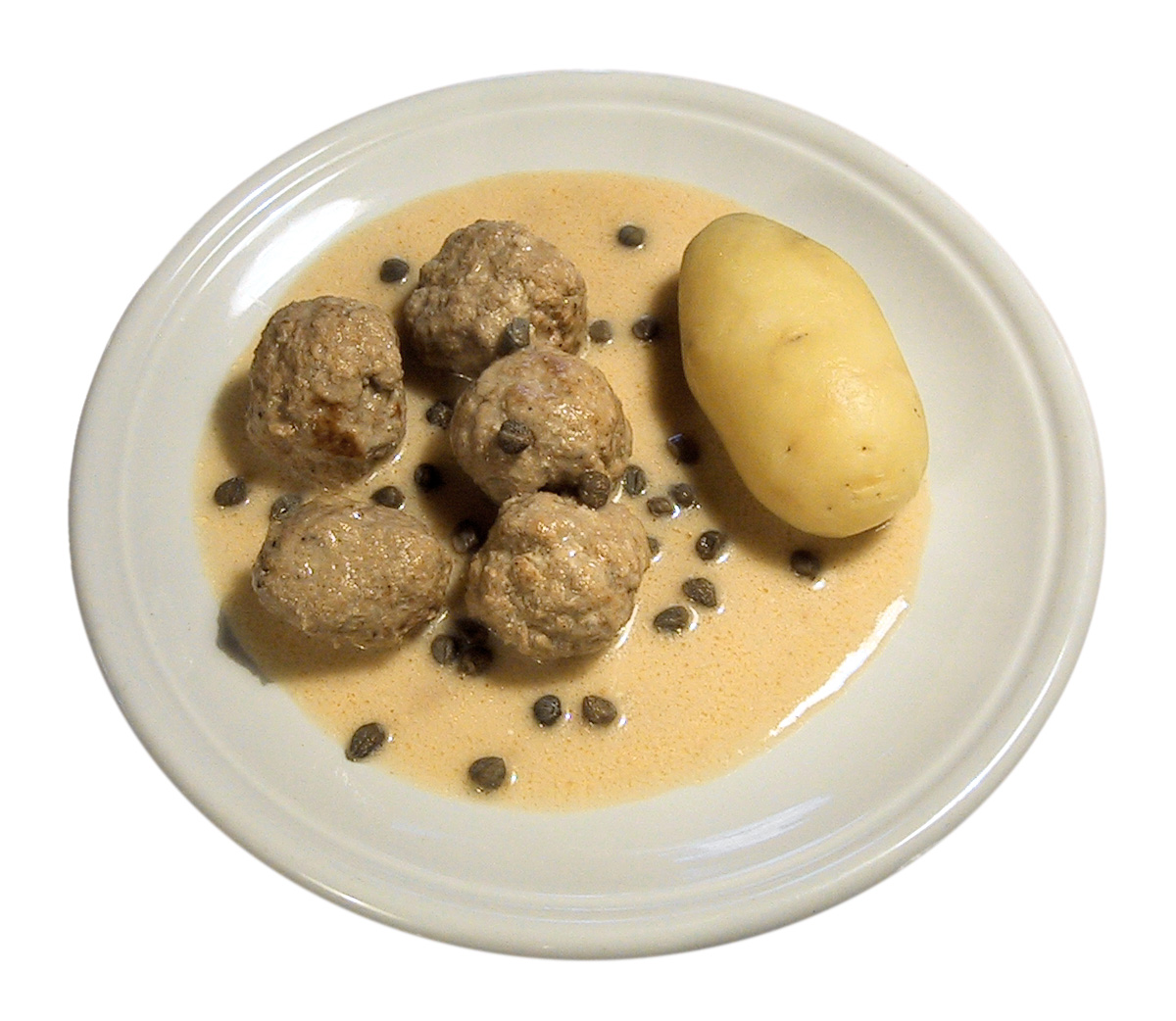
- Königsberger Klopse
- Alternative names: Soßklopse
- Place of origin: East Prussia and Germany
- Main ingredients: Minced meat (traditionally veal, alternatively beef or pork)
- Ingredients generally used: White sauce with capers

Königsberger Klopse (German pronunciation: [ˈkøːnɪçsbɛʁɡɐ ˈklɔpsə]), also known as Soßklopse, are a German specialty of meatballs in a creamy white sauce with capers. The dish is distinguished within German cuisine by its gentle low-temperature poaching technique, pale roux-based sauce, and the incorporation of minced anchovy into the meat paste.

== Name ==
The dish is named for the former German city of Königsberg (now Kaliningrad, Russia), and is one of the highlights of historical East Prussian cuisine. In the German Democratic Republic (GDR), the dish was officially called Kochklopse ("boiled meatballs") to avoid any reference to its namesake city, which in the aftermath of World War II had been annexed by the Soviet Union. The city's German inhabitants had been expelled, and the city had been repopulated with Russians and other Soviet citizens and renamed after Mikhail Kalinin, a close ally of Joseph Stalin in the Soviet leadership. Königsberger Klopse were jokingly referred to as Revanchistenklopse. Königsberger Klopse are still a popular dish in present-day Germany and is also available as canned food. In 2022, it was featured on CNN as one of the best German dishes.

== Preparation ==
Königsberger Klopse

The meatballs are made from very finely minced veal, though less expensive beef or pork is often substituted to balance cost, fat content, and moisture retention. Along with the minced meat, the mixture incorporates onions, eggs, soaked white bread rolls or breadcrumbs, and spices, chiefly white pepper. If both anchovy and herring are omitted, it may be generically called Soßklopse (sauced meatballs).

=== Meat mixture ===
Stale white bread rolls (Brötchen) are soaked in lukewarm milk or water and thoroughly squeezed dry before being worked into the mince, preventing dense protein binding and yielding a tender, light crumb. Raw eggs provide structural cohesion during cooking, while finely minced or sweated onions add subtle sweetness and moisture. The traditional recipe uses finely minced anchovy fillets (Sardellen) worked directly into the meat paste to provide savory umami depth without an overt fishy flavor. If salted herring is substituted, the dish is called Rostocker Klopse. The paste is seasoned with white pepper, salt, and occasionally freshly grated nutmeg or lemon zest before being hand-rolled into smooth spheres.

=== Poaching technique ===
Unlike many European meatball varieties that are pan-fried, roasted, or baked, Königsberger Klopse are strictly poached. The shaped meatballs are submerged in an aromatic poaching liquid prepared from beef, veal, or vegetable stock infused with halved onions, dried bay leaves, whole allspice berries (Piment), black peppercorns, and an acidifier such as white wine vinegar or fresh lemon juice. Maintaining temperature control is essential: the meatballs are cooked at a gentle simmer between 80°C and 85°C for 12 to 15 minutes rather than at a vigorous boil. Avoiding boiling temperatures prevents the meat proteins from tightening excessively, ensuring the spheres remain soft, intact, and pale in color. Once cooked through, the meatballs are lifted from the liquid with a slotted spoon and kept warm while the sauce is prepared.

=== Caper sauce construction ===
The signature white sauce is constructed directly from the reserved poaching liquid to capture the meat juices and spice aromatics released during simmering. The broth is first strained through a fine-mesh sieve to remove the whole spices and onion pieces. A simpler version of the recipe thickens the sauce with flour or starch only, omitting the egg yolk, while a refined version uses only egg yolk as a thickener. In standard bourgeois and restaurant preparations, butter and wheat flour are cooked briefly to form a pale roux (Mehlschwitze), taking care not to brown the flour so the finished dish retains its ivory hue. The strained poaching stock is gradually whisked into the roux to produce a smooth velouté, followed by heavy cream, fresh lemon juice or caper brine, and capers, which are an essential ingredient across all versions. In classical preparations, the pan is removed from direct heat and tempered (legiert) with an egg yolk whisked into cream for a glossy sheen and richer body before the meatballs are returned to warm through.

== Comparison with other German classics ==
Königsberger Klopse holds a distinct technical and sensory position within traditional German cuisine, defined primarily by its low-temperature water-bath cooking, pale emulsified sauce, and the pairing of cured seafood umami with ground meat.

=== Comparison with Frikadellen ===
Frikadellen

When compared to Frikadellen (also known as Buletten in northeastern Germany or Fleischpflanzerl in Bavaria), the contrast in cooking method and surface texture is substantial. While Frikadellen rely on high-heat pan-frying in clarified butter or oil to develop a dark, caramelized outer crust through the Maillard reaction, Königsberger Klopse are strictly poached at a gentle simmer between 80°C and 85°C. This water-bath cooking prevents browning entirely, yielding a soft, uniform, and pale meat sphere. Furthermore, while standard Frikadellen emphasize garden herbs and aromatics such as marjoram, flat-leaf parsley, and mustard, traditional recipes derive their savory backbone from finely minced anchovies or cured Baltic herring worked directly into the meat paste. In terms of service, Frikadellen are typically eaten warm or cold as a dry, handheld snack or pub dish alongside mustard and potato salad, whereas Königsberger Klopse are inseparable from their hot caper cream sauce.

=== Comparison with Sauerbraten and Rinderrouladen ===
The dish also contrasts sharply with slow-braised German beef classics such as Sauerbraten and Rinderrouladen. Sauerbraten, a regional specialty associated with the Rhineland and Franconia, balances richness with sourness through a multi-day marination of whole beef cuts in vinegar, wine, and spices, culminating in a dark, sweet-and-sour pan gravy often thickened with gingerbread crumbs (Soßenlebkuchen) or sugar beet syrup. In contrast, Königsberger Klopse introduces acidity at the very end of cooking via fresh lemon juice and caper brine, suspending this tartness within a pale, creamy roux-based sauce. Similarly, Rinderrouladen consists of thinly sliced beef top round rolled around bacon, pickles, onions, and mustard, browned and braised into a deep brown stock reduction. While Rinderrouladen and Sauerbraten represent hearty, dark-hued braises associated with cold-weather Sunday dining, Königsberger Klopse maintains a lighter visual presentation and a brighter, citrus-and-caper flavor profile.

=== Comparison with Currywurst ===
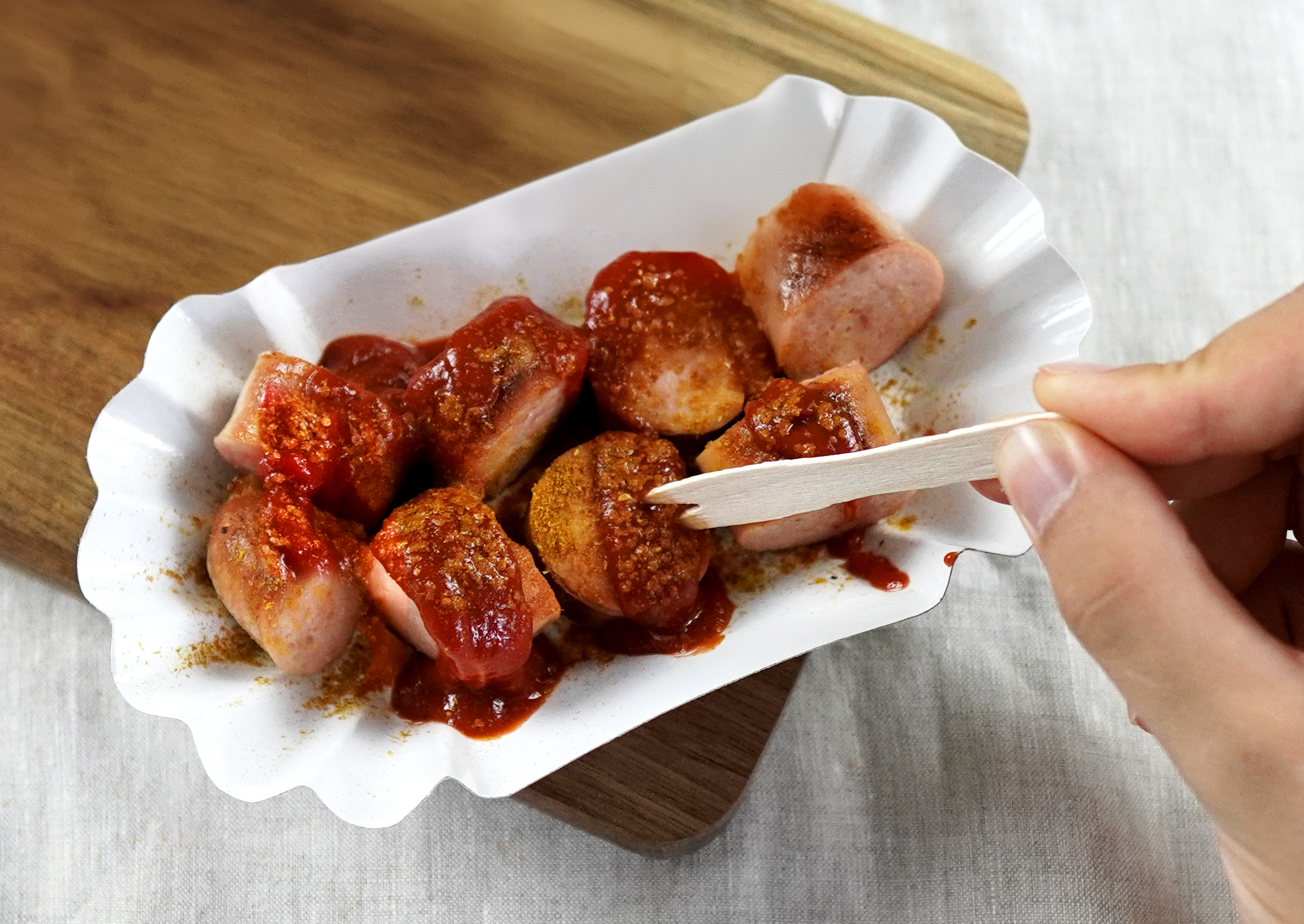
Currywurst

In terms of historical origin and dining context, Königsberger Klopse contrasts with post-war German street-food staples such as Currywurst. Developed in post-war Berlin in 1949, Currywurst was designed around accessible, rapid urban dining, featuring steamed and fried pork sausage sliced and topped with spiced tomato ketchup and curry powder, served primarily at quick-service snack stands (Imbiss). Königsberger Klopse, by contrast, originated as an 18th- and 19th-century bourgeois and restaurant specialty requiring multi-stage culinary execution—including stock aromatization, precise temperature regulation during poaching, and delicate sauce tempering—cementing its status as a formal, plated centerpiece of historic Prussian home and restaurant cooking.

== Serving and cultural impact ==
=== Traditional accompaniments ===
Königsberger Klopse are served hot, plated with a generous ladle of white caper sauce spooned over the meatballs. The dish is traditionally served with beetroot and boiled potatoes or, less often, with rice:

- Boiled salted potatoes (Salzkartoffeln): Plain boiled, peeled waxy or floury potatoes serve as the primary starch, designed to absorb the caper cream sauce, though steamed white rice is occasionally served as a modern household alternative.
- Pickled beetroot (Rote Bete): Sliced or diced pickled beetroot is traditionally served on the side or in a small accompanying dish, as its earthy sweetness and sharp vinegar tang cut through the creamy texture of the velouté.

=== Recognition and legacy ===
Königsberger Klopse remains one of the most widely recognized traditional dishes in German food culture, ranking alongside enduring regional staples such as Sauerbraten and Rouladen. Following the post-World War II displacement of Germans from East Prussia, the recipe was carried westward by expellees and integrated into everyday household cooking, school and workplace canteens, and traditional restaurant menus across both West Germany and East Germany. In contemporary Germany, the dish remains widely accessible in home kitchens, regional restaurants, ready-made chilled meals, and canned preserves. Culturally and historically, it endures as one of the most prominent surviving culinary links to the former city of Königsberg and the historic region of East Prussia.

== See also ==
  - Cuisine of Germany
  - List of meatball dishes
  - East Prussian cuisine
  - German cuisine
