= Fricassee =

Method of cooking meat

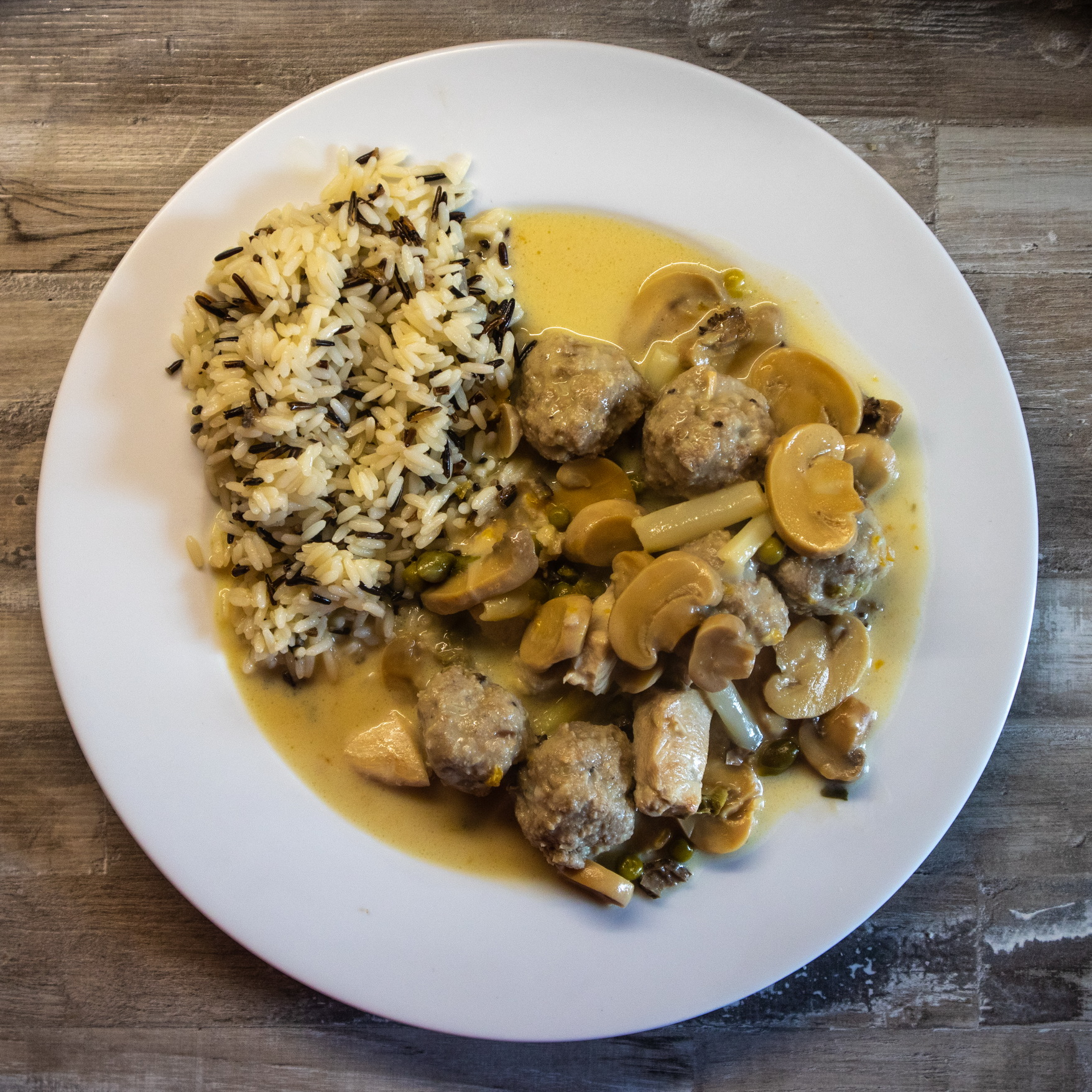
A meatball and mushroom fricassee served with rice

Fricassee or fricassée /ˈfrɪkəsiː/ is a stew made with pieces of meat that have been browned in butter, then served in a sauce flavored with the cooking stock. Fricassee is usually made with chicken, veal or rabbit, with variations limited only by the ingredients the cook has at hand.

== Etymology ==
Fricassee is first attested in English in the mid-16th century. It is a word of French origin, although the exact etymology is unclear. It is theorized to be a compound of the French frire (to fry) and casser or quasser (to break into pieces).

== History ==
By the general description of frying and then braising in liquid, there are recipes for fricassee as far back as the earliest version of the medieval French cookbook Le Viandier, circa 1300. In 1490, it was first referred to specifically as friquassée in the print edition of Le Viandier.

The 1586 cookery book The Good Huswifes Jewell contains "For fricasies of a lambes head and purtenance".

The perfect English cooke contains instructions to prepare a "Fregacy of Lamb or Veal". Jean-Baptiste Tavernier describes "a lusty Fricassie" in his late 17th-century Travels through Turkey to Persia.

English fricassees were usually thickened with egg yolks, while Italian fricassea used a mixture of lemon and egg yolks. By the 18th century, egg yolks had started to be replaced by flour in English and American cuisines. In Martha Washington's recipe for chicken fricassee, the chicken was stewed in gravy, then a sauce was made with cream and egg yolks.

The early 19th-century cookery book A New System of Domestic Cookery by Maria Rundell says white sauce can be used for fricassee of "Fowls, Rabbits, White Meat Fish, of Vegetables". Broth made with chicken necks or feet or used to boil meats, or similar is simmered with herbs and lemon peel, then thickened with cream (or egg yolk), flour, and butter to make into a sauce.

== Technique ==
Simone Beck, Louisette Bertholle and Julia Child in their Mastering the Art of French Cooking describe a fricassee as halfway between a sauté and a stew, in that a sauté has no liquid added, while a stew includes liquid from the beginning. In a fricassee, cut-up meat is first sautéed (but not browned), then liquid is added, and it is simmered to finish cooking. Cookbook author James Peterson notes that some modernized versions of the recipe call for the meat to be thoroughly browned before braising, but the classical version requires that both meat and vegetables have no caramelization.

== Types ==
=== Beef ===
In Rundell's early 19th-century A New System of Domestic Cookery, a fricassee of cold roast beef is made with very thinly sliced beef cooked in butter and broth with parsley and onion, and the sauce is thickened with egg yolks, wine, and vinegar. Fricassee of cold roast beef was among the recipes published in the popular women's magazine Godey's Lady's Book during the American Civil War.

=== Chicken and other poultry ===
Chicken fricassee has been described as "a standard old-fashioned American dish". It was one of Abraham Lincoln's favorite dishes. It is the typical "comfort food" of Cajun cuisine.

A 1734 American recipe by Mrs. John Burroughs calls for birds seasoned with nutmeg, parsley, onion, and mace, dredged in flour and browned in butter, then stewed in the pan with gravy, egg yolks, wine, and nutmeg to make a sauce with the consistency of thickened cream. A 19th-century recipe from California for fricasa de pollos a la española (Spanish-style chicken fricasse) was prepared by frying chickens in lard with chopped onion, shallots, garlic, and mushrooms. Tomato juice was added with olives, fresh herbs, and olive oil to make a thick stew.

One of the more popular dishes in the Spanish Caribbean is fricasé de pollo (chicken fricassee). It was brought to the islands by settlers from the south of France and Spain. Unlike French-style fricassee, it has a tomato-based sauce, usually with red wine. Similarly, fricassee chicken is made in other Greater Antillean islands such as Jamaica. It is also made with a tomato-based sauce with local herbs and spices. Jamaican fricassee chicken is a popular Sunday dinner dish.

=== Rabbit ===
Hannah Glasse's rabbit fricassee is made with small pieces of breaded rabbit fried in butter and served with red wine gravy.

=== In Jewish cuisine ===
Jewish fricassee is nearly always made from poultry (most commonly goose or chicken), generally from offal and other chicken scraps, and sometimes includes meatballs. In Ashkenazi Jewish cuisine, it is called געהאַקטע הינדל : gehakte hindl (chopped chicken) and may include gizzards, chicken neck, wing tips, and feet. Sephardic cooks may refer to the dish as armin de poyo or (in Morocco) fricassada. Whereas non-Jewish cooks used dairy fat (such as butter) or lard to cook their fricassee, Jews used schmaltz (in the Ashkenazi lands) or olive oil (in the Sephardic world) as a cooking fat, due to the prohibition on mixing meat and dairy products. The dish typically has a thick, saucy gravy, and is served alongside rice, noodles, barley farfel, or dumplings.

== See also ==
- Coq au vin
- List of meat dishes
- Spanish fricco – Westphalian beef, potato and onion stew
