= Spanish fricco =

Westphalian beef, potato and onion stew

Spanish Fricco, also spelled as Spanish frikko, is a stew of Westphalian cuisine in Germany. It is a hearty dish prepared primarily using diced beef, potatoes and onions, typically in a cream soup base prepared using butter and sour cream. Pork and lamb has also sometimes been traditionally used. A Frikko recipe is included in the Practical Cookbook first published by Henriette Davidis in 1845. The dish has sometimes been noted for having a relatively unappealing visual appearance when completed.

Spanish fricco is a traditional dish in Meschede, a town in the Hochsauerland district, in North Rhine-Westphalia, Germany. The town of Bad Sooden-Allendorf in the Werra-Meißner-Kreis in Hesse, Germany also claims Spanish fricco as a traditional dish and its people serve it annually for Thanksgiving and Heimatfest.

== Etymology ==
A theory of the origin of the dish is based upon a takeover from the neighboring Spanish Netherlands. Alternatively, the adoption of a meal of the Spanish-inspired court of Jérôme Bonaparte, who ruled the Kingdom of Westphalia from 1807 to 1813, is assumed. Another theory holds that the name "fricco" was derived as a corruption of the word fricassee.

== See also ==
- List of German dishes
- List of stews
