= Rostbrätel =

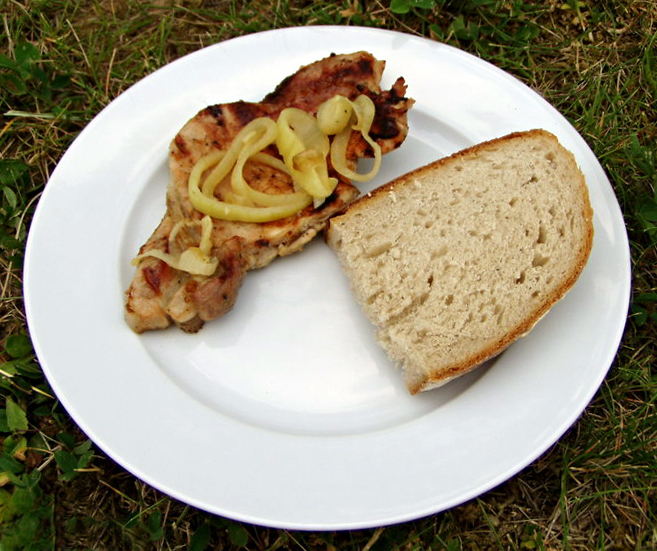
Rostbrätel with bread

A Rostbrätel is a marinated cutlet of pork neck, grilled over charcoal. It is, after the Thuringian sausage (Rostbratwurst), the second-most popular Thuringian specialty.

The label "Rostbrätel" is common in West Thuringia and South Thuringia.

For preparation, about an inch cut of pork neck cutlet (with or without bone) is pressed (tenderized) and marinated in salt, pepper, mustard, onions and beer for two to up to 24 hours. In some recipes, garlic and Caraway Seed are added as further spices.

Cooking is done on a charcoal grill. The grates are greased with pork fat, bacon, oil, butter or cooking spray in order to prevent sticking. While the meat is gently cooked over light to medium heat, it is basted after every turn with the marinade or with beer, sprayed directly from a gently shaken bottle. This serves to improve the taste and prevents a drying of the meat on the cooking surface. Moreover, the cooking temperature is regulated by gently spraying beer directly on the charcoal; the rising steam helps to cook and flavour the meat.

It is served with caramelized onions and German beer.
