= Eisbein =

Corned ham hock

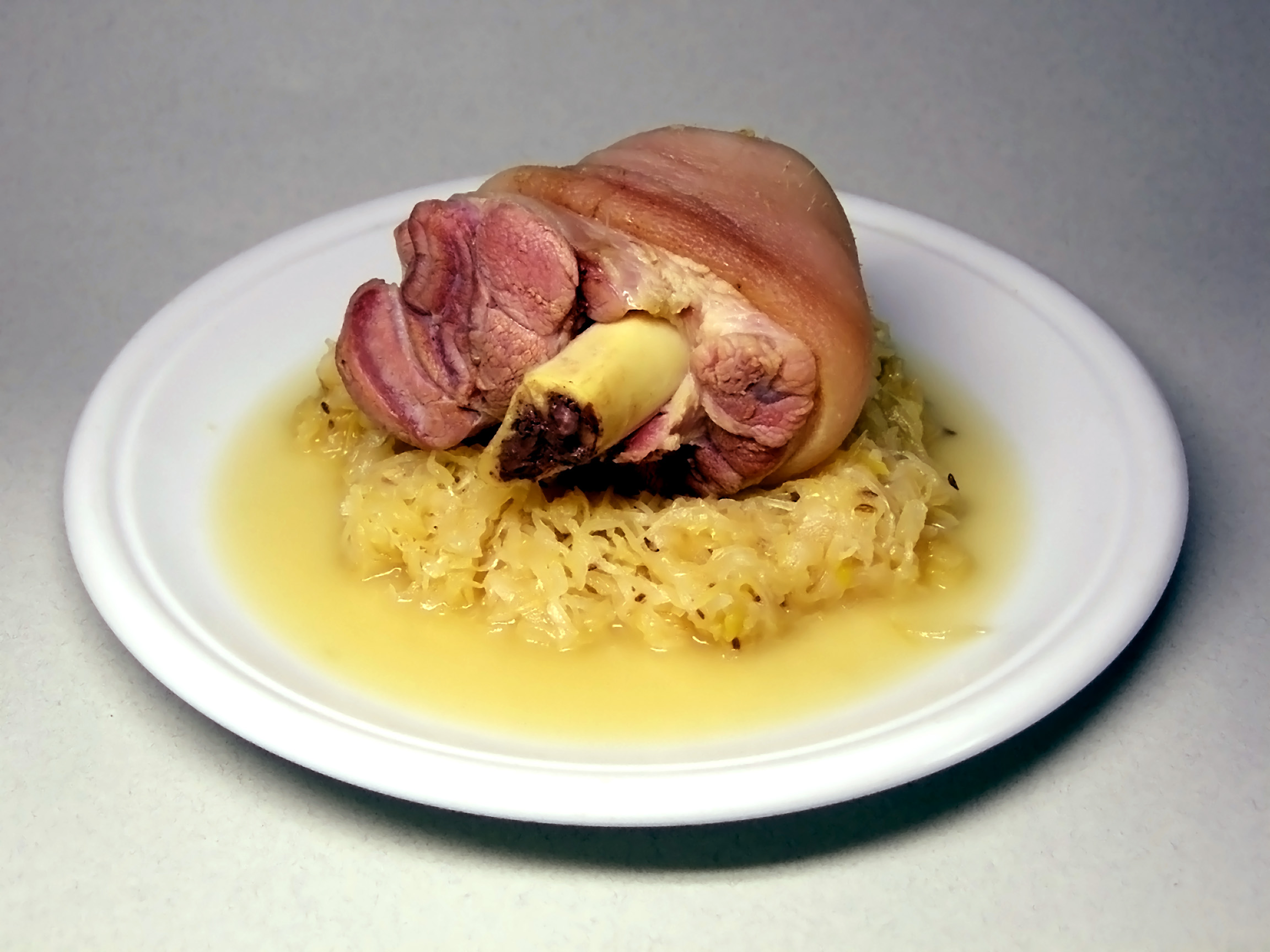
Corned Eisbein, with Sauerkraut

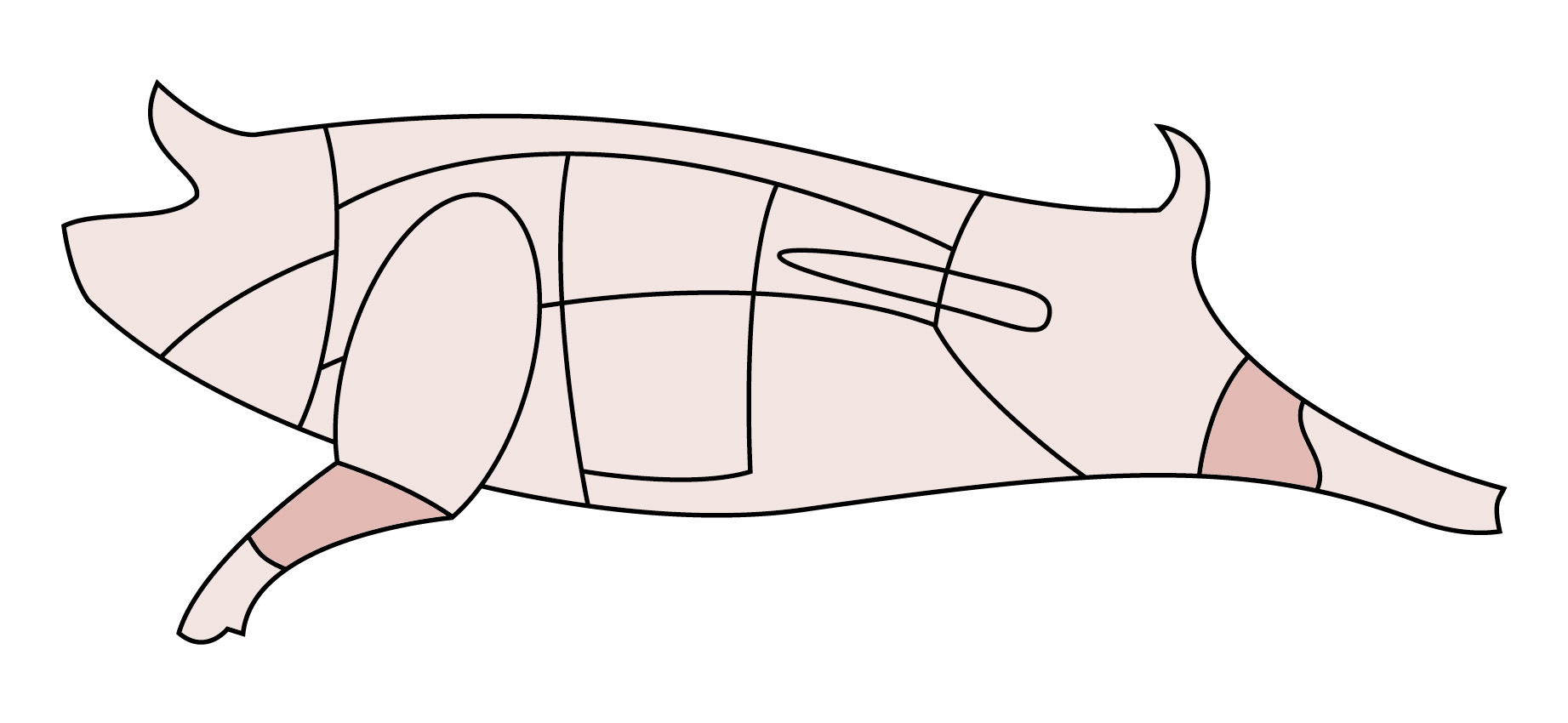
Ham hock position

Eisbein [ˈaɪ̯sˌbaɪ̯n] is a German dish of corned ham hock, usually cured and slightly boiled.

== Regional variations ==
Eisbein is usually sold already cured and sometimes smoked, and then used in simple hearty dishes. Numerous regional variations exist, for example in Berlin it is served with pease pudding. In southern parts of Germany it is usually roasted. In Franconia it is commonly served with mashed potatoes or sauerkraut, in Austria with horseradish and mustard instead. In southern Germany, the common preparation is known as Schweinshaxe.

== Etymology ==
The name Eisbein for the German dish of pickled pork knuckle has been in use since the 10th century. Initially, Old and Middle High German īsbēn was a technical term referring to the hip-bone and surrounding bones used by hunters and doctors, probably derived from Greek ischíon (hip bone) via Latin ischia (hip joint). The word evolved to its current form and meaning in New High German.

== In other countries ==
In Santa Catarina, Brazil, Eisbein (joelho de porco in Portuguese) is an important part of the regional cuisine with German origins, brought by the German immigrants who settled in the state. The dish is traditionally served at festivals and German-inspired restaurants, such as the Oktoberfest of Blumenau.

The Polish cuisine's golonka, '(little shin)' or golonko and the Swedish cuisine's fläsklägg med rotmos are very similar, alternatively grilled on a barbecue. Other similar dishes include the Swiss cuisine's Wädli and the Austrian cuisine's Stelze.

== See also ==
- List of pork dishes
