= Mettwurst =

German pork sausage

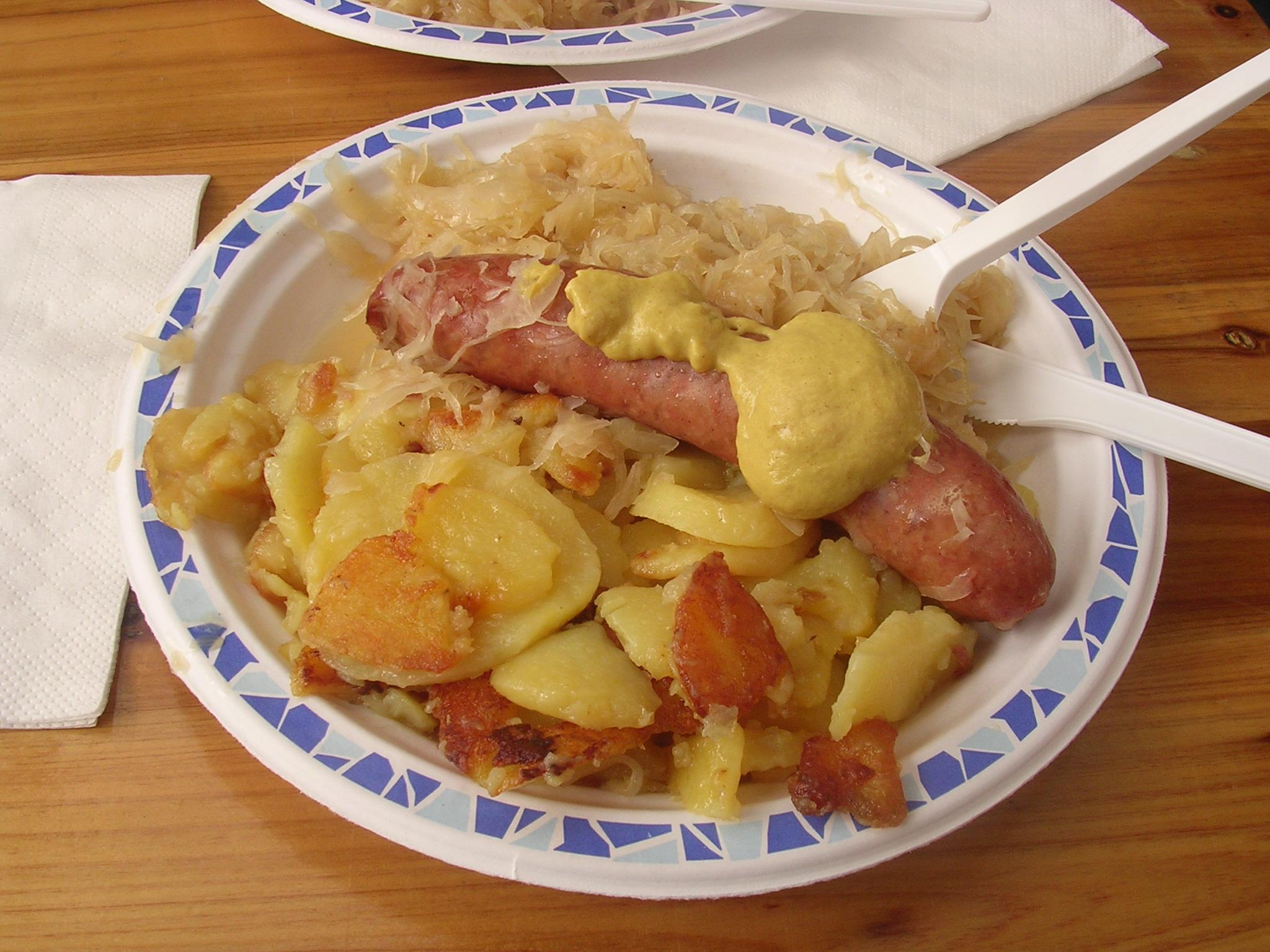
- Mettwurst with sauerkraut, fried potatoes and yellow mustard
- Type: Sausage
- Place of origin: Germany
- Main ingredients: Raw minced pork
- Ingredients generally used: Garlic

Mettwurst (German: [ˈmɛtvʊʁst]) is a strongly flavored German sausage made from raw minced pork preserved by curing and smoking, often with garlic. The southern German variety is soft and similar to Teewurst. Braunschweiger Mettwurst is partially smoked but still soft and spreadable, while other northern German varieties such as Holsteiner are harder and more akin to salami, due to longer duration of smoking.

== Etymology ==
The Low German word mett, meaning 'minced pork without bacon', is derived from the Old Saxon word meti (meaning 'food'), and is related to the English word 'meat'.

== Preparation and usage ==
Mettwurst can be prepared and eaten in a variety of ways, such as cooked or fried or spread on rye bread with onions and eaten raw. When minced raw pork is prepared without curing or smoking, it is called simply Mett. The skin is meant to be eaten and is typically not removed.

It is important that high-quality, fresh ingredients are used; otherwise, deadly microorganisms and toxins can develop. In January 1995, 23 children became very ill, one of whom died, which the coroner found was a result of eating garlic Mettwurst.

== Outside of Germany ==
In South Australia, due to large German immigration in the 19th century (to, for example, the town of Hahndorf), Mettwurst (sometimes spelled "metwurst") is common: it is created in the northern German style and served as a cold cut. It is often consumed in school lunches and as a snack during parties.

In the United States, Mettwurst is most commonly associated with the city of Cincinnati, where it is regarded as a signature dish. The town of Mineola, Iowa, which was settled almost exclusively by immigrants from Schleswig-Holstein, hosts an annual heritage dinner with "Schoening-style" cold-smoked Mettwurst known in the Low German dialect as Metvuss.

In Santa Catarina, Brazil, Mettwurst is known as Linguiça Blumenau. It is associated with the Vale do Itajaí region due to past German immigration.

== Similar products ==
Finnish meetvursti resembles the Dutch metworst or salami; it is dry, hard, strong-flavored and dense, and is eaten as a cold cut on bread.

== See also ==
- List of sausages
- List of smoked foods
