= Sauerbraten =

German roast meat entree

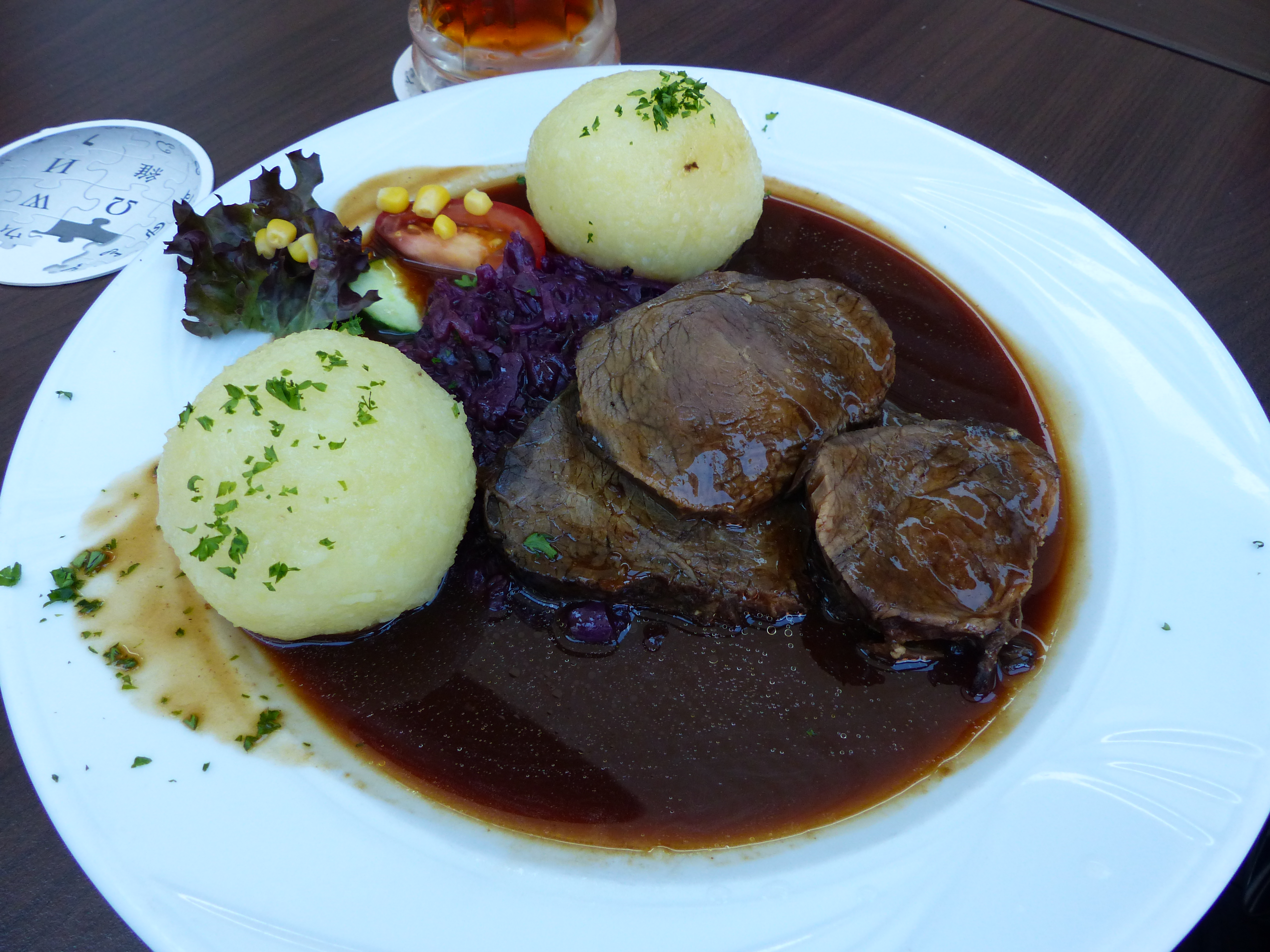
- Sauerbraten with Kartoffelklöße (potato dumplings)
- Type: Meat course
- Course: main course
- Place of origin: Germany
- Region or state: Throughout Germany and German-speaking regions.
- Main ingredients: Meat (usually beef, veal, venison or horse), marinated in wine and/or vinegar, vegetables, and spices.

Sauerbraten (pronounced [ˈzaʊ̯ɐˌbʁaːtn̩]) is a traditional German roast of heavily marinated meat. It is regarded as a national dish of Germany, and is frequently served in German-style restaurants internationally. It can be cooked from a variety of meats, most often from beef, but also from chicken, lamb and mutton, pork and horse. Before cooking, the raw meat is marinated for 5 to 15 days in a mixture of wine or vinegar, water, herbs, spices, and seasonings. Usually, tougher cuts of meat, such as rump roast or bottom round of beef, are used, and the long marinating tenderizes the meat. A Sauerbraten dinner is almost always accompanied by a hearty gravy resulting from its roasting and is most often served with potato pancakes (Kartoffelpuffer), potato dumplings (Kartoffelklöße), or Spätzle.

Ingredients used in the marinade, and accompaniments served with sauerbraten, vary across regions. Regional variants of the dish include those from Baden, Franconia, Thuringia, Rhineland, Saarland, Silesia, and Swabia.

== Etymology ==
The name "Sauerbraten" is of German origin, and is derived from sauer meaning "sour" or "pickled" and Braten meaning "roast meat", thus "sour roast".

== History ==
Julius Caesar has been assigned a role in the inspiration for sauerbraten as he sent amphoras filled with beef marinated in wine over the Alps to the newly founded Roman colony of Cologne. According to this legend, this inspired the residents of Cologne to imitate the Roman import. While quite common, these claims are largely unsubstantiated.

Several sources believe sauerbraten was invented by Charlemagne in the 9th century AD as a means of using leftover roasted meat. Saint Albertus Magnus, also known as Saint Albert the Great and Albert of Cologne, is also credited with popularizing the dish in the 13th century.

Horse meat was not originally used for the dish, although it has become commonly used in restaurants in the Rhineland. Most other areas in which the dish is found currently use beef.

== Regional variations ==
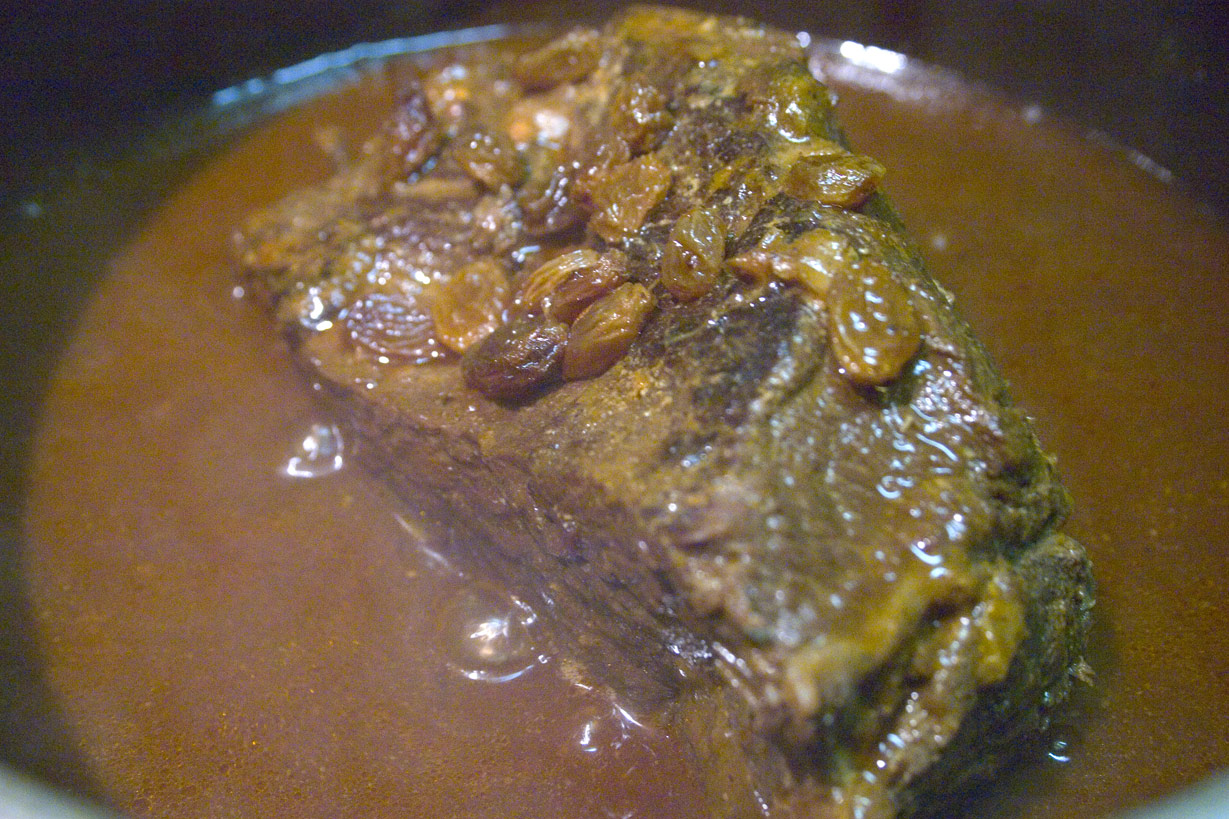
Rheinischer Sauerbraten, in which sweetness from raisins balances the sourness and acidity of the marinade

There are many regional variants of sauerbraten. Many of the variations are in the ingredients used for the marinade in which the cut of meat is immersed for several days before cooking.

Generally, the marinade's base is either red wine, vinegar, or a combination of both. While Germany largely produces white wines such as Riesling and Gewürztraminer, regions of Germany that are closer to France often use red wine as the base for the marinade. Wine vinegar, apple cider vinegar and other varieties can be used as a base. Recipes from eastern regions of Germany closer to Poland and the Czech Republic tend to use vinegar as the base more frequently. In many regions, wine and vinegar are used together.

- Rheinischer Sauerbraten is prepared in Germany's Rhineland region—along the valley of the Rhine. Raisins and sometimes sugar beet syrup are added in cooking to provide sweetness to complement the sourness of the marinade.

== Preparation ==
=== Meat selection ===
Sauerbraten can be made with many different kinds of roasting meat. Tougher, less expensive cuts of meat are used—typically a rump roast or bottom round of beef.

Venison or other game is often prepared as sauerbraten as the spices and vinegar take away the gamey taste of the meat.

=== Marination ===
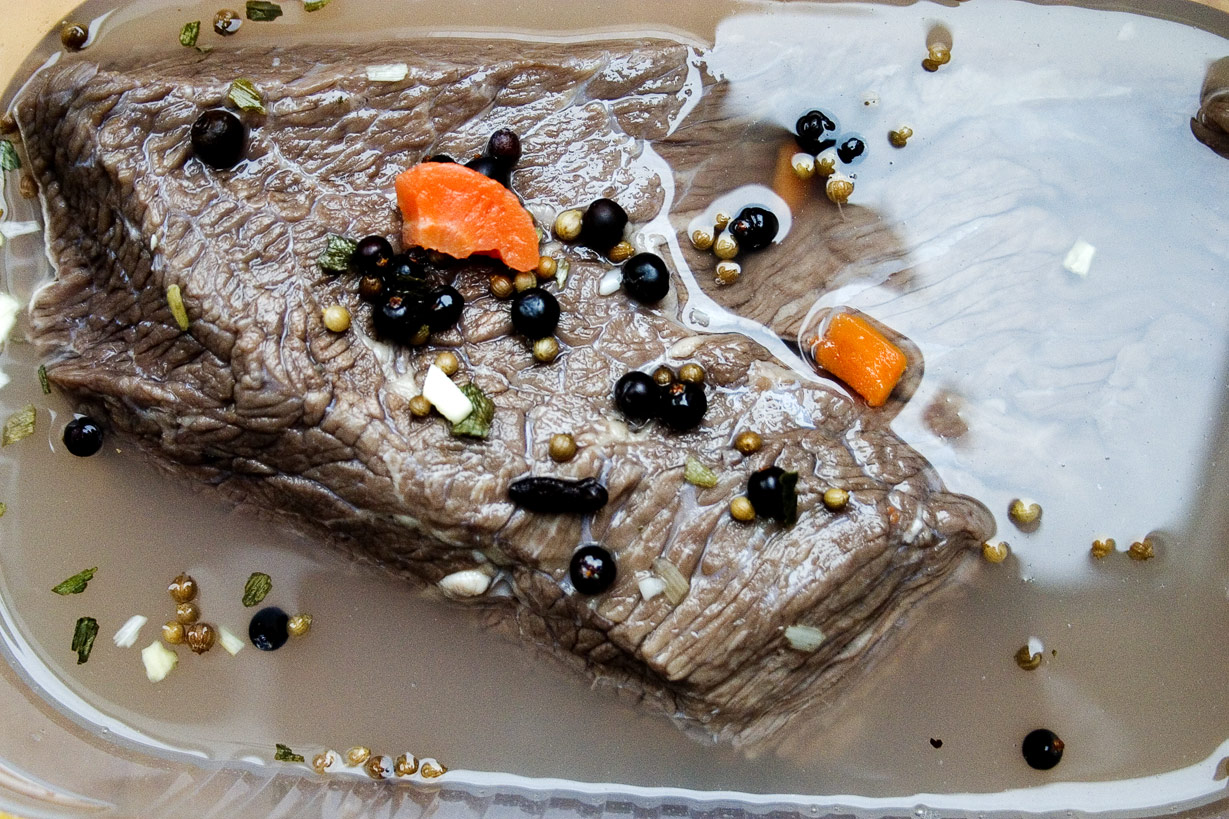
Sauerbraten marinating

A solid cut from the bottom round or rump is marinated for three or four days, or as many as ten, before cooking.

Red wine vinegar and wine typically form the basis of the marinade, which also includes earthy aromatic spices such as peppercorns, juniper berries, cloves, nutmeg, and bay leaves and less commonly coriander, mustard seed, cinnamon, mace, ginger, and thyme. The marinade may also include vegetables such as onions, celery, and carrots. The acidic marinade helps tenderize the meat before it cooks. Buttermilk is also used as a marinade in certain regional varieties. It is frequently advised to marinate the meat in an earthenware, glass, plastic, or enamel container rather than one made of bare metal, as the acidic marinade would react with a metal vessel during the extended marinating.

=== Cooking ===
After the meat is removed from the marinade and dried, it is first browned in oil or lard and then braised with the strained marinade in a covered dish in a medium oven or on the stovetop. After simmering for four hours or more, depending on the size of the roast, the marinade will continue to flavor the roast and, as the meat cooks, its juices will also be released resulting in a very tender roast.

=== Gravy ===
After the roast is cooked, the marinade is strained and returned to a saucepan where it is thickened (often with crushed gingerbread, lebkuchen—in particular Aachener Printen—or gingersnaps, flour, sour cream, brown sugar, and/or roux) which add body and flavor to the sauce. Before it closed in 1982, Lüchow's German restaurant in New York City used crushed gingersnap cookies to season and thicken the gravy of its sauerbraten, one of the favored dishes. This style was made popular in the U.S. after the publication of Luchow's German Cookbook: The Story and the Favorite Dishes of America's Most Famous German Restaurant by Jan Mitchell in 1952.

== Other ==
Packaged sauerbraten seasonings are available. Cooked sauerbraten in marinade is sold in some supermarkets.

While sauerbraten is most traditionally eaten with beer, it pairs well with the following wine varietals: Burgundy, Cabernet Franc, Cabernet Sauvignon, Gewürztraminer, Pinot noir, Riesling, and Syrah.

== General references ==
- Babcock, Erika M. L. (2002). Rika's Stories from the Other Side. IUniverse.
- Barer-Stein, Thelma (1999). You Eat What You Are. A FireFly Book.
- Casada, Jim & Casada, Ann (1996). The Complete Venison Cookbook: From Field to Table. Krause Publications.
- Garrett, Theodore Francis (ed.) (1898). The Encyclopedia of Practical Cookery. L. Upcott Gill, 170, Strand, W.C. London. Vol. III.
- Hassani, Nadia (2004). Spoonfuls of Germany: Culinary Delights of the German Regions in 170 Recipes. Hippocrene Books.
- Herter, George Leonard & Herter, Berthe (1995). Bull Cook and Authentic Historical Recipes and Practices (9th ed.). Ecco.
- Jackson, Michael (1998). Ultimate Beer. DK ADULT.
- Kummer, Madison (2007). 1,001 Foods to Die For. Andrews McMeel Publishing.
- Mitchell, Jan (1953). Luchow's German Cookbook: The Story and the Favorite Dishes of America's Most Famous German Restaurant. Garden City, New York: Doubleday & Company, Inc.
- O'Neill, Molly (1992). New York Cookbook: From Pelham Bay to Park Avenue, Firehouses to Four-Star Restaurants. Workman Publishing Company.
- Richards, Lenore & Treat, Nola (1966). Quantity Cookery: Menu Planning and Cooking for Large Numbers (4th ed.). Little, Brown, & Co.
- Saekel, Karola (December 28, 2005). "Sauerbraten recipe surfaces just in time". San Francisco Chronicle, F-5.
- Sales, Georgia (1977). The Clay Pot Cookbook. Wiley & Sons.
- Schmidt, Gretchen (2003). German Pride: 101 Reasons to Be Proud You're German. Citadel Press.
- Sheraton, Mimi (1965). The German Cookbook: A Complete Guide to Mastering Authentic German Cooking. Random House.
- The American Heritage Dictionary of the English Language (4th ed.). (2006) Houghton Mifflin Company.
- The Culinary Institute of America (2011). The Professional Chef (9th ed.). Hoboken, New Jersey: John Wiley & Sons. p. 587. ISBN 978-0-470-42135-2. OCLC 707248142.
- Wood, Morrison (1983). Through Europe with a Jug of Wine. Farrar, Straus and Giroux, p. 95.
- Youngkrantz, Gini (1997). Authentic German Home Style Recipes (4th ed.). B. G. Youngkrantz Company.
