= Birnen, Bohnen und Speck =

North German dish

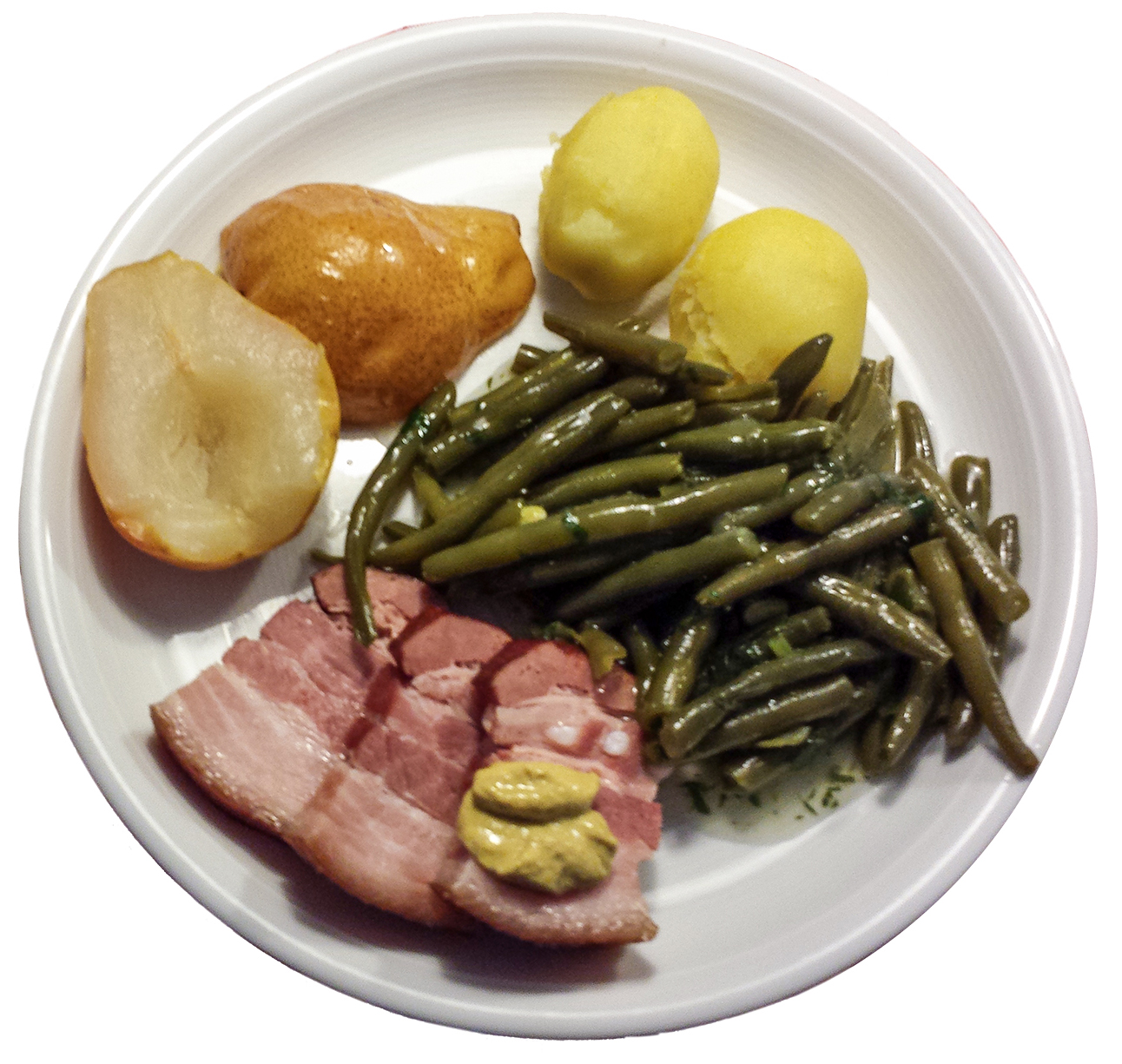
- Type: Stew
- Place of origin: Germany
- Region or state: North Germany
- Main ingredients: Pears, beans, bacon, potatoes

Birnen, Bohnen und Speck ("pears, beans and bacon") is a North German dish which is especially popular in the states of Schleswig-Holstein, Lower Saxony, Mecklenburg-Vorpommern and Hamburg. It also goes under the names of Bohnen, Birnen und Speck and, locally, the Low German names of Grööner Hein and Grönen Heini (lit: "Green Harry"). The seasonal availability of its ingredients means that the dish is mainly eaten in the months of August and September.

The dish is a type of stew, in which—as the name indicates—the main ingredients are pears, beans and speck. In North German country kitchens, potatoes would also be added, even though they are not specifically mentioned.

== Ingredients ==
Generally cut green beans (Brechbohnen) are used. In Hamburg on the markets occasionally "Turkish peas" may be found, despite its name a Vierlande bean variety that used to be frequently used for this dish.

== See also ==
- Blindhuhn – Westphalian vegetable and bacon stew
- List of stews
