= Linsen mit Spätzle =

Swabian dish of egg noodles, lentils, and wiener sausages

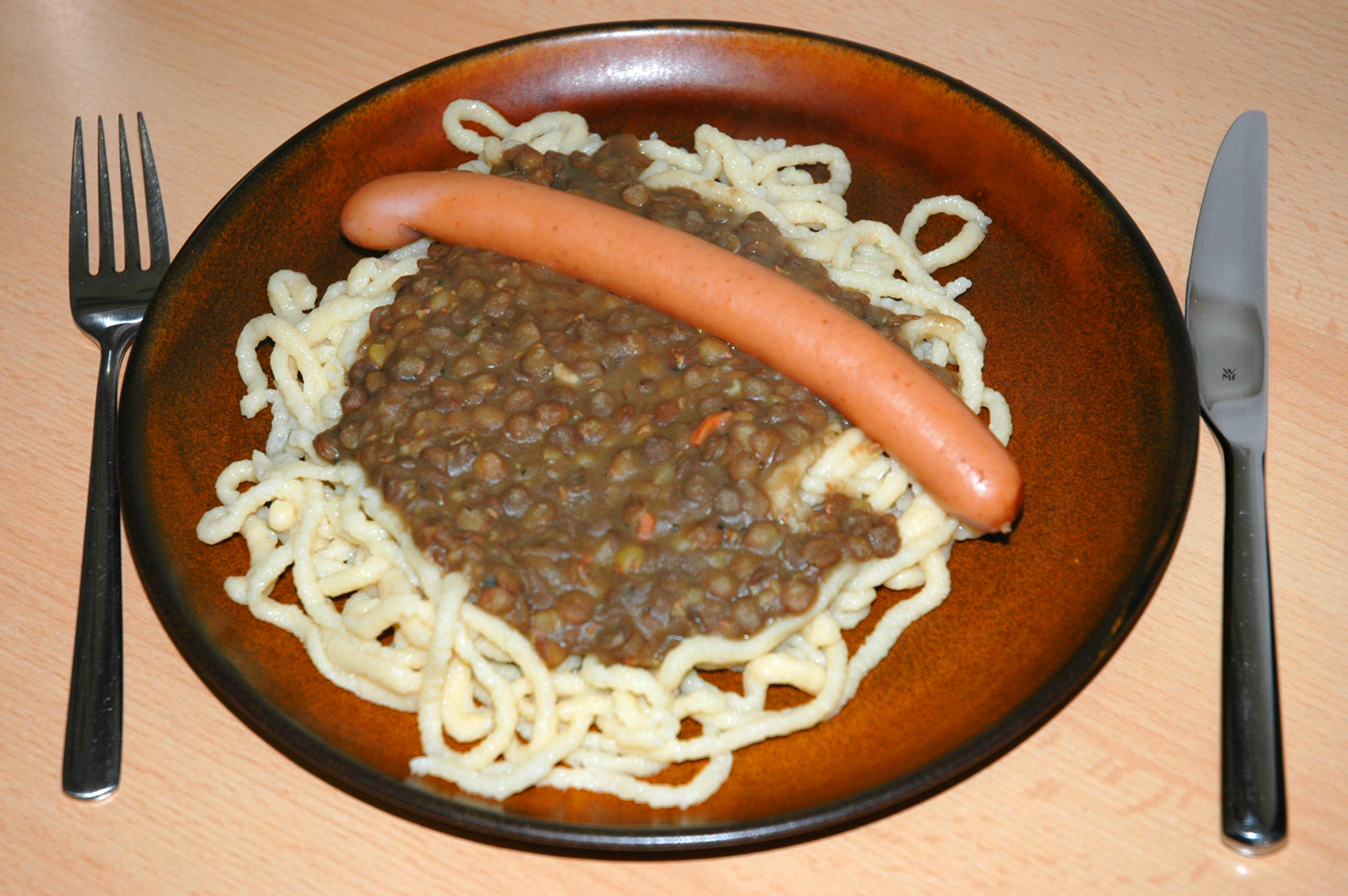
- Linsen mit Spätzle with typical sausage accompaniment
- Course: Main course
- Place of origin: Germany
- Region or state: Swabia
- Serving temperature: Hot
- Main ingredients: Spätzle, lentils, sausage

Linsen mit Spätzle (lentils with Swabian pasta), normally accompanied by wiener sausages, is a traditional Swabian dish that is by many Swabians considered the Swabian national meal in the southwestern region of Germany.

== History ==
Like many dishes from the region, Linsen mit Spätzle originated as a meal for the poor. While meat was too expensive for the major part of the Swabian population, lentils were a popular and nutritious staple food which could be stored during winter. Lentils are also a crop that can be produced even on soils of low nutrient content in the region. The combination of wheat and egg and lentils is a good source of protein with high biological value.

Today this winter dish is on the menu of many traditional Swabian restaurants. Aside from that, it is a popular meal in company staff canteens and university cafeterias. It is also a popular dish for cooking at home.

== See also ==
- List of pasta dishes
- List of sausage dishes

== External links (in parts German) ==
- Instruction in American English
- Rezept mit ausführlicher Beschreibung der Zubereitungsschritte
- Rezept mit ausführlicher Beschreibung der Zubereitungsschritte für die Linsen und hier für die Spätzle
- Verfeinertes Rezept
