= Reibekuchen =

German potato pancake

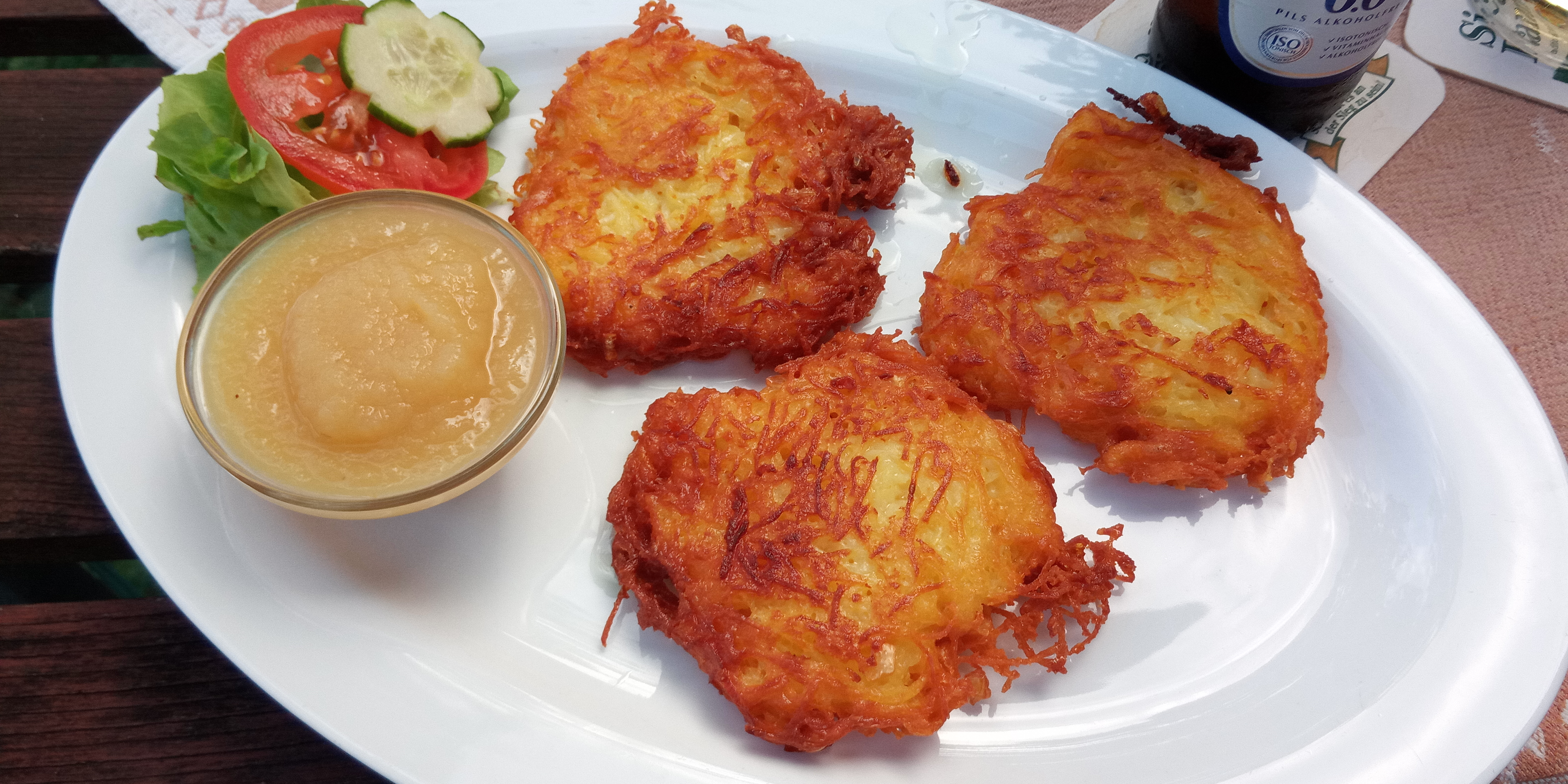
- Alternative names: Kartoffelpuffer
- Type: Fritter, street food
- Place of origin: Germany
- Region or state: Rheinland
- Main ingredients: Potatoes

Reibekuchen are German potato pancakes, also known as Kartoffelpuffer. They are common in many areas of Germany, the name "Reibekuchen" being characteristic to the Rheinland area. Reibekuchen may be served with apple sauce, sour cream or creme fraiche, pumpernickel bread, treacle, or with Maggi-brand seasoning sauce. They are often sold at street fairs and markets, such as Christmas markets in Germany.

As Riefkuukskes, they are also considered to be a local dish in neighboring Gelderland, the Netherlands.

== See also ==
- Potato pancake
- Korokke
- Croquette
- Latkes
