= German fries =

Thinly sliced raw or cooked potatoes fried in fat

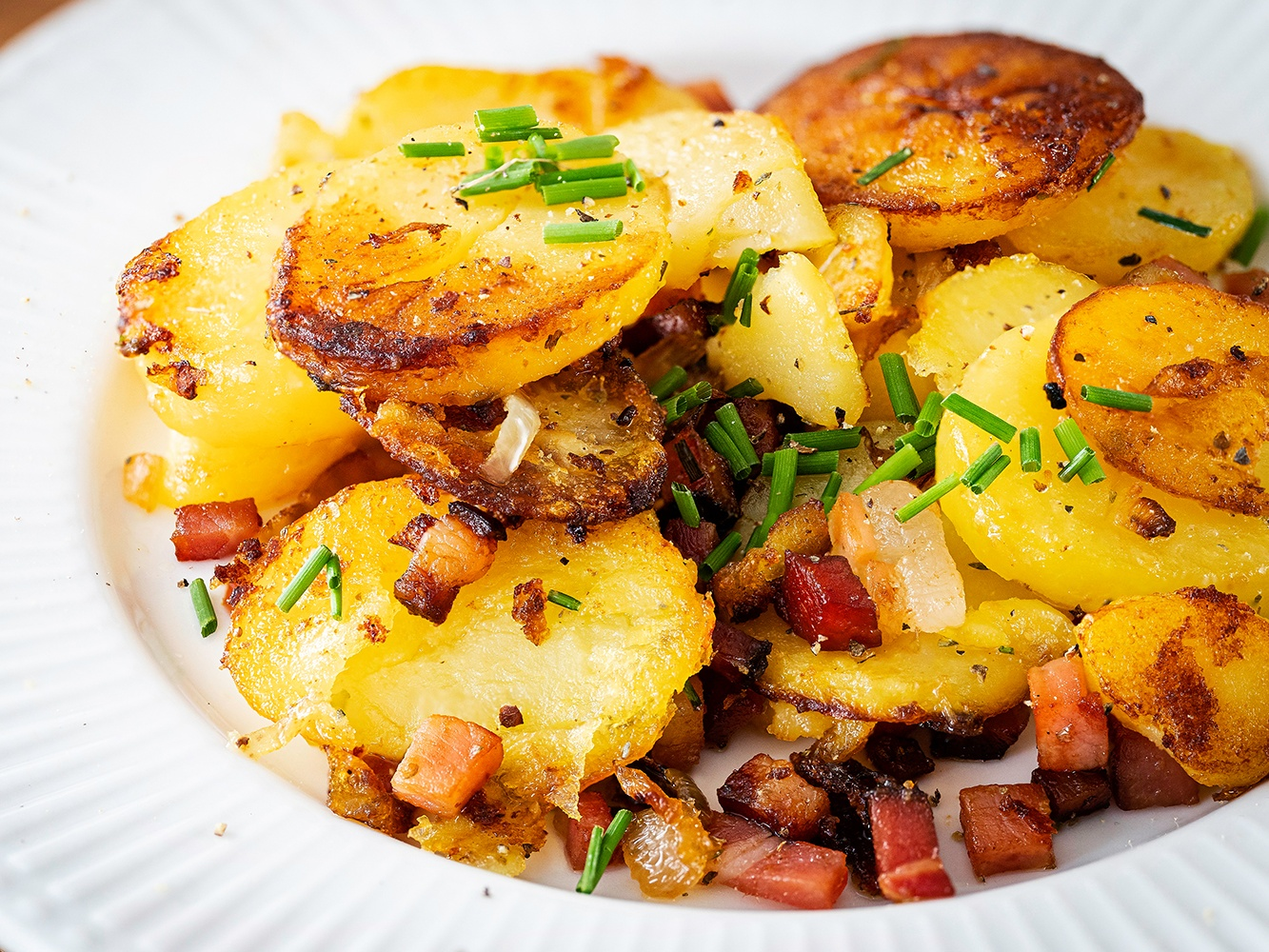
Bratkartoffeln with bacon and seasonings

German fries (also referred to as German fried potatoes) is a dish consisting of thinly sliced raw or cooked potatoes fried in fat, like lard, butter or vegetable oils. Bacon and onion slices are common additional ingredients. Salt and pepper are always used for seasoning, while caraway, marjoram, rosemary and garlic are optional. By the 1870s, dishes under these names were listed in American and British cookbooks. In German, they are called Bratkartoffeln (pronounced [ˈbʁaːtkaʁˌtɔfl̩n], lit. 'fry-potatoes').

== In the United States ==
During World War I in the United States, due to Germany being an enemy of the United States, "German" place names (such as Berlin, Ohio) and the adjective "German" were often expunged from the American language; by 1918, "French fries", shortened to "fries", had won the name game in the United States and Canada". During this time, the dish was sometimes referred to as "American fries", due to U.S. opposition to Germany during this time.

== Preparation ==
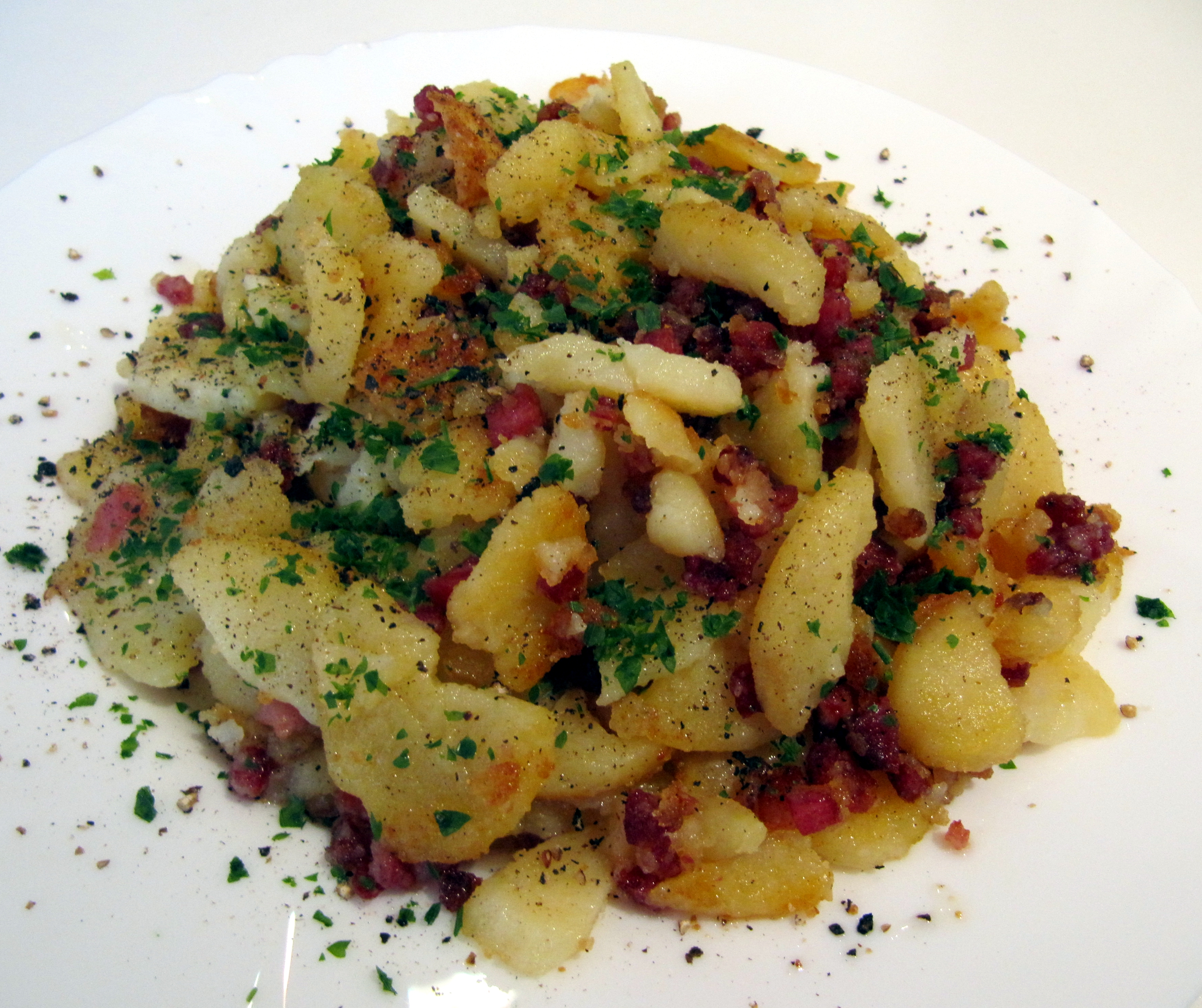
Bratkartoffeln with bacon

Preparation may involve pan-frying or deep-frying the potatoes and the addition of ingredients, such as cooked bacon, onion and green pepper. Some versions may use thinly sliced potatoes. Paprika may be added for flavor. Whether raw or cooked potatoes are to be used, the latter either fresh or stored for some days and used only after ageing, remains a question of discussion, depending on personal taste, as well as regional influences.

German fries may be served with schnitzel, or as an accompaniment to sausages, such as bauernwurst. Some restaurants serve them as a side dish.

== See also ==
- Bauernfrühstück
- French fries
- Fried potatoes
- German cuisine
- Home fries
- List of deep-fried foods
- List of German dishes
- List of potato dishes
