= Aachener Printen =

German honey cake originating from Aachen

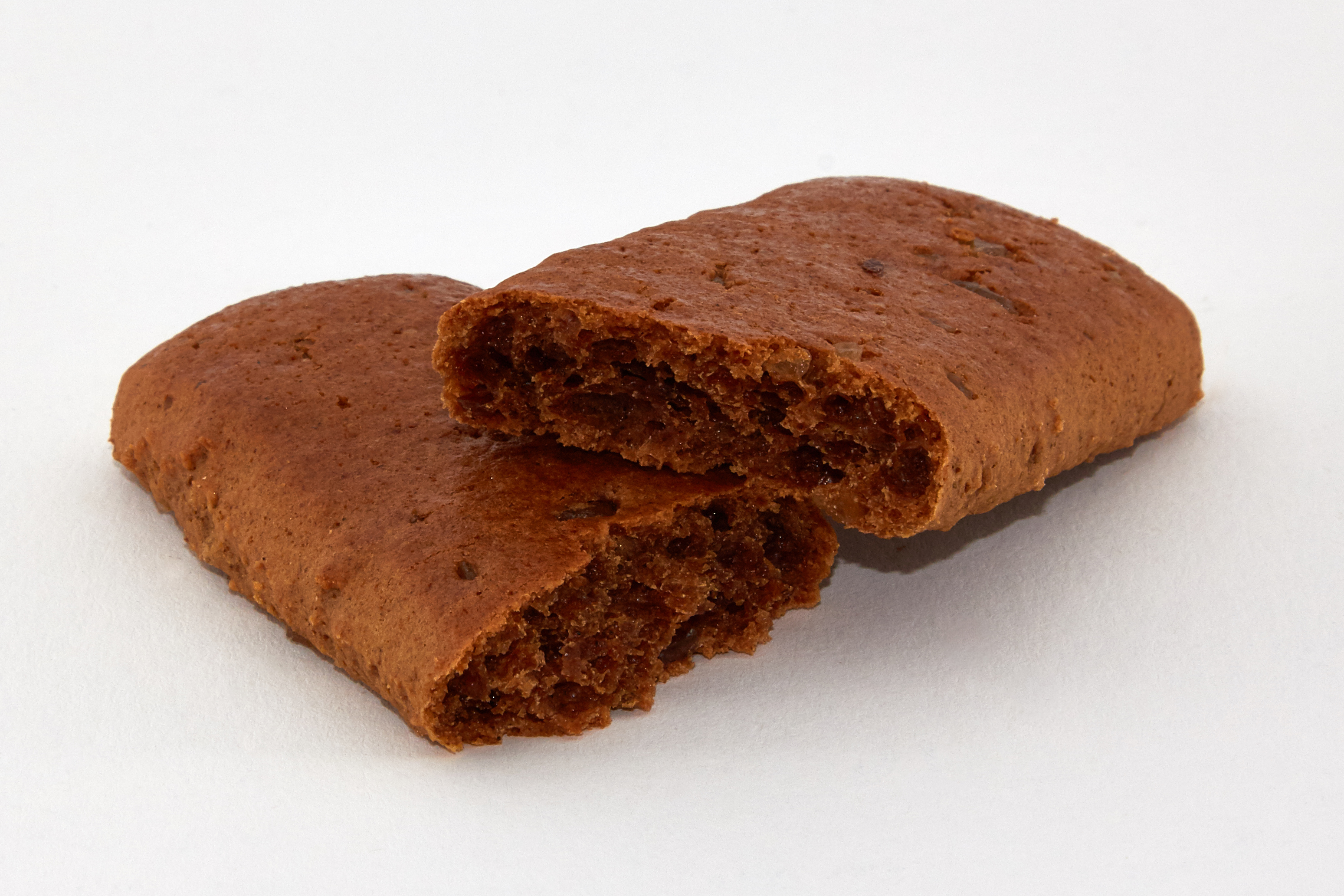
- A herbal Aachener Printe broken in half
- Type: Lebkuchen
- Place of origin: Germany
- Region or state: Aachen
- Main ingredients: sugar beets, spices (cinnamon, aniseed, clove, cardamom, coriander, allspice, ginger)

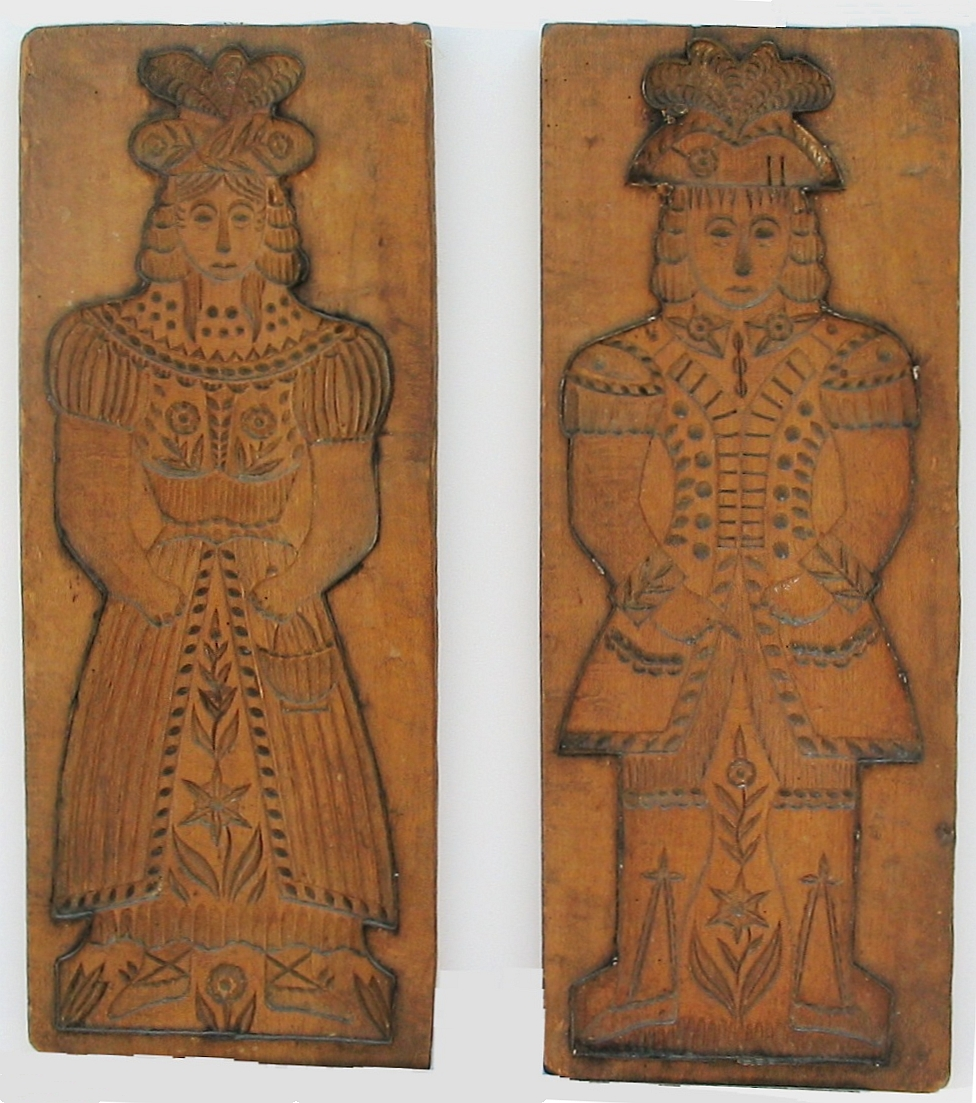
18th century Printen cast

Aachener Printen are a type of Lebkuchen originating from the city of Aachen in Germany. Similar to gingerbread, they were originally sweetened with honey, but are now generally sweetened with a syrup made from sugar beets.

The term is a protected geographical indication, meaning that all manufacturers must be located in or near Aachen.

== History ==
Aachener Printen were at least partially created due to the numerous pilgrims who wanted to visit the Aachen Cathedral. The Printen may have been inspired by Couque de Dinant, a pastry from Dinant that was usually baked in the form of figurative representations or artistic braids. Gebildbrot came to Aachen in the 15th century with immigrant blacksmiths and quickly found popularity among the city's bakers. They made a soft dough sweetened with honey, which they pressed into elaborately carved baking molds depicting saints and other figures. The Aachener Printen became what they are now in 1806, when the French emperor Napoleon blocked the British trade routes and with them Aachen's supply of cane sugar and honey, the most important ingredients for the pastry. The bakers replaced the sweeteners with sugar and syrup from local beets. An original baker named Henry Lambertz then came up with the idea of rolling out the dough over raised molds. The robust cookies can be efficiently produced in large quantities and are ideal as travel provisions, which is why their reputation has spread far beyond Aachen. The Lambertz-Gruppe, founded in 1688, is Aachen's oldest and largest manufacturer of Printen.

== Production ==
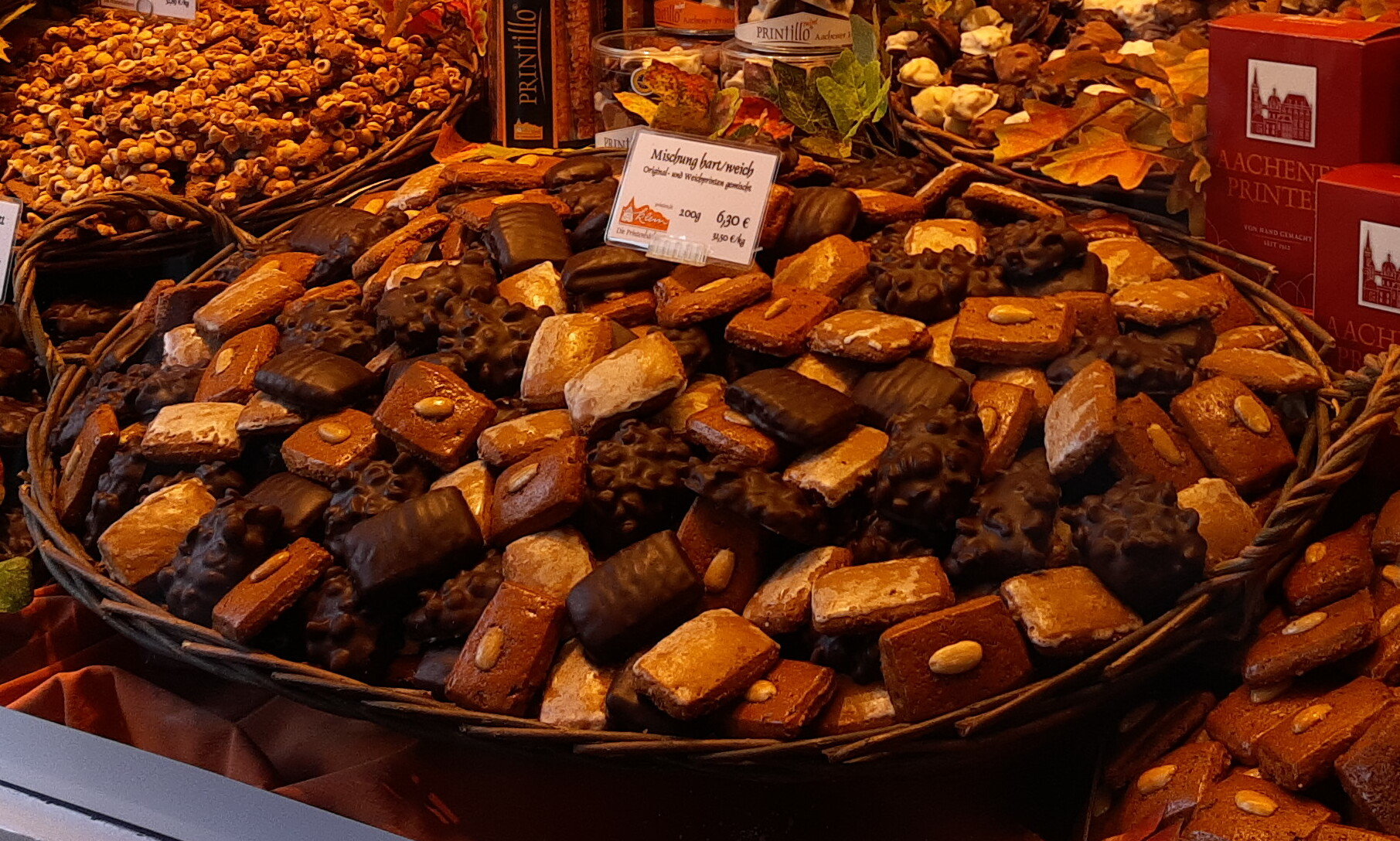
Display of printen in an Aachen bakery

Originally sweetened with honey, nowadays Aachener Printen are sweetened with the syrup from sugar beets as honey became temporarily unavailable when Napoleon issued a trade embargo, banning all trade with the main supplier of honey, the United States. The tradition of sweetening with sugar beets was kept even after Napoleon was defeated and the French occupation lifted.

Printen are made from a variety of ingredients including cinnamon, aniseed, clove, cardamom, coriander, allspice and also ginger. The exact mixture of these ingredients, however, is a close kept secret of the individual Printen bakeries.

Additionally to the original Printen, there are also Printen with nuts (usually almonds), covered in chocolate or glaze and marzipan.

== See also ==
- List of German desserts
