= Franconian cuisine =

Regional cuisine of Franconia

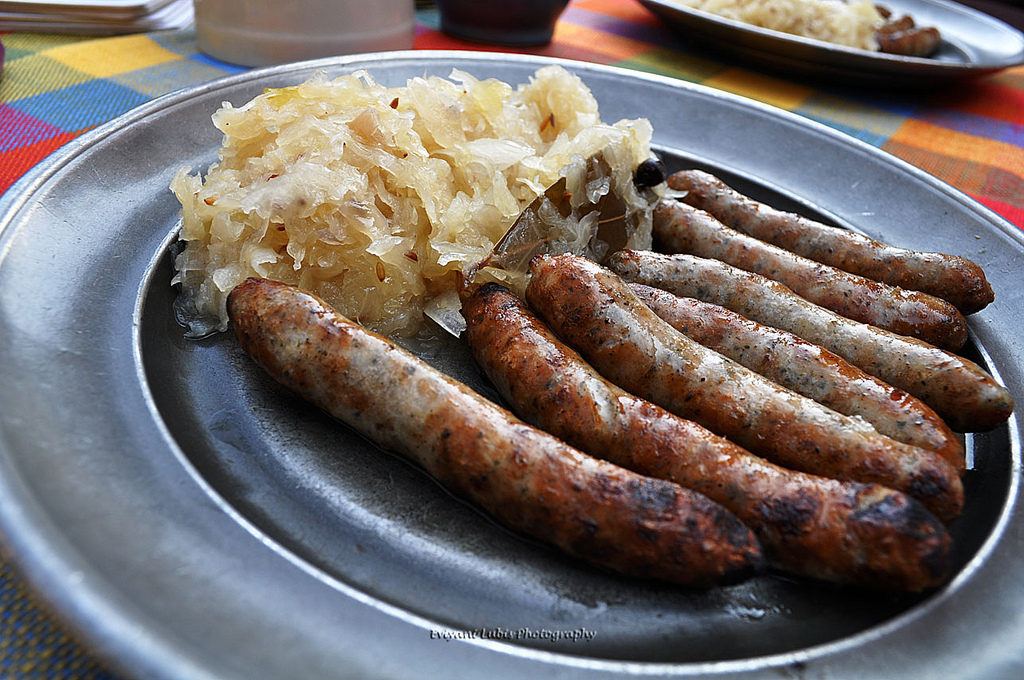
Nürnberger Rostbratwürste with Sauerkraut

Franconian cuisine is an umbrella term for all dishes that nominally belong to the region of Franconia. It is a subtype of German cuisine with many similarities to Bavarian cuisine and Swabian cuisine. It is often included in the Bavarian cuisine, since most parts of Franconia belong to Bavaria today. There are several Franconian food items that are also famous beyond the borders of Franconia, such as Nürnberger Lebkuchen, Bratwurst and the wines of Franconia. Franconia is also famous for its beer and harbours the highest density of breweries in the world.

== Bratwurst ==
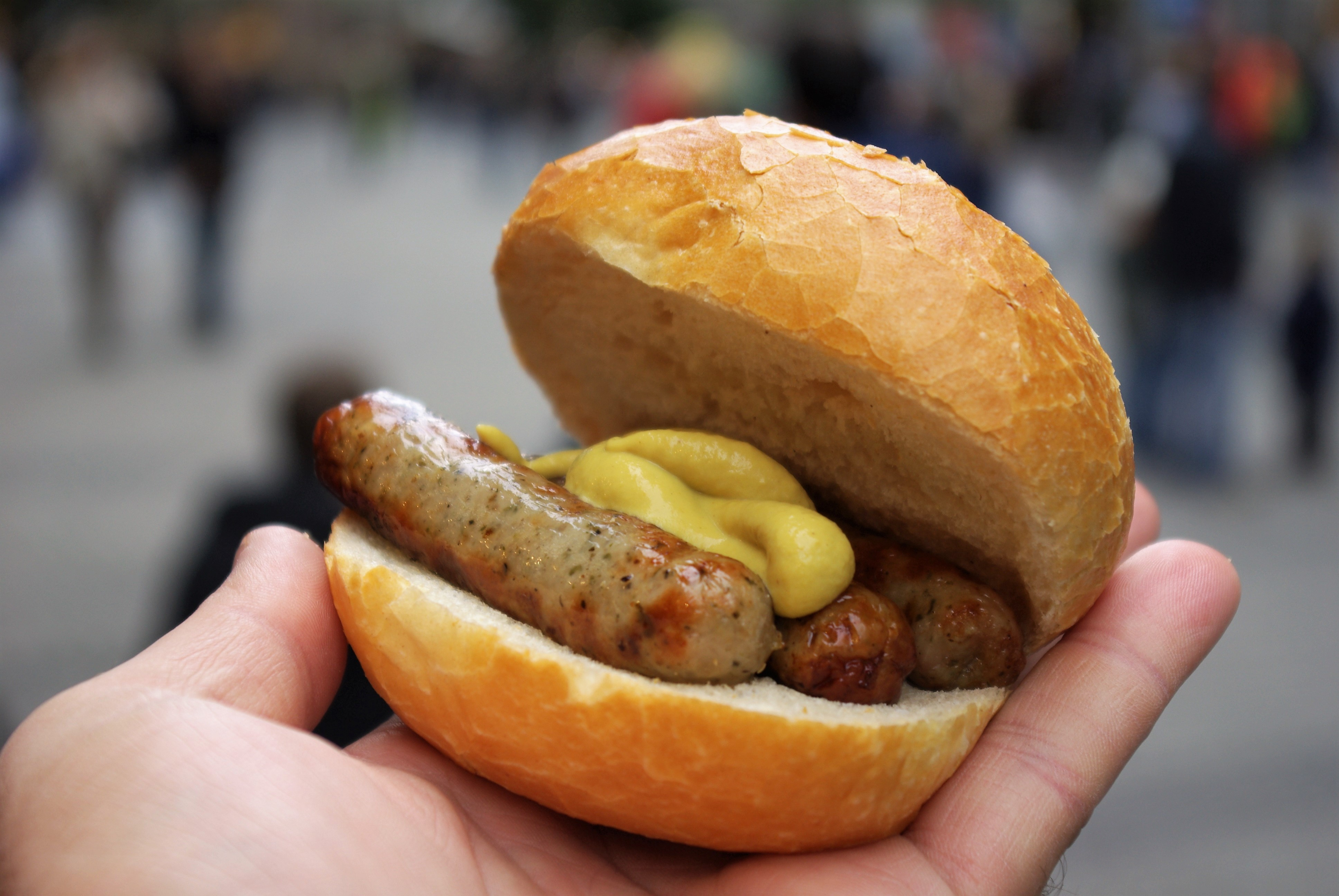
»Drei im Weggla« (Three in a bun)

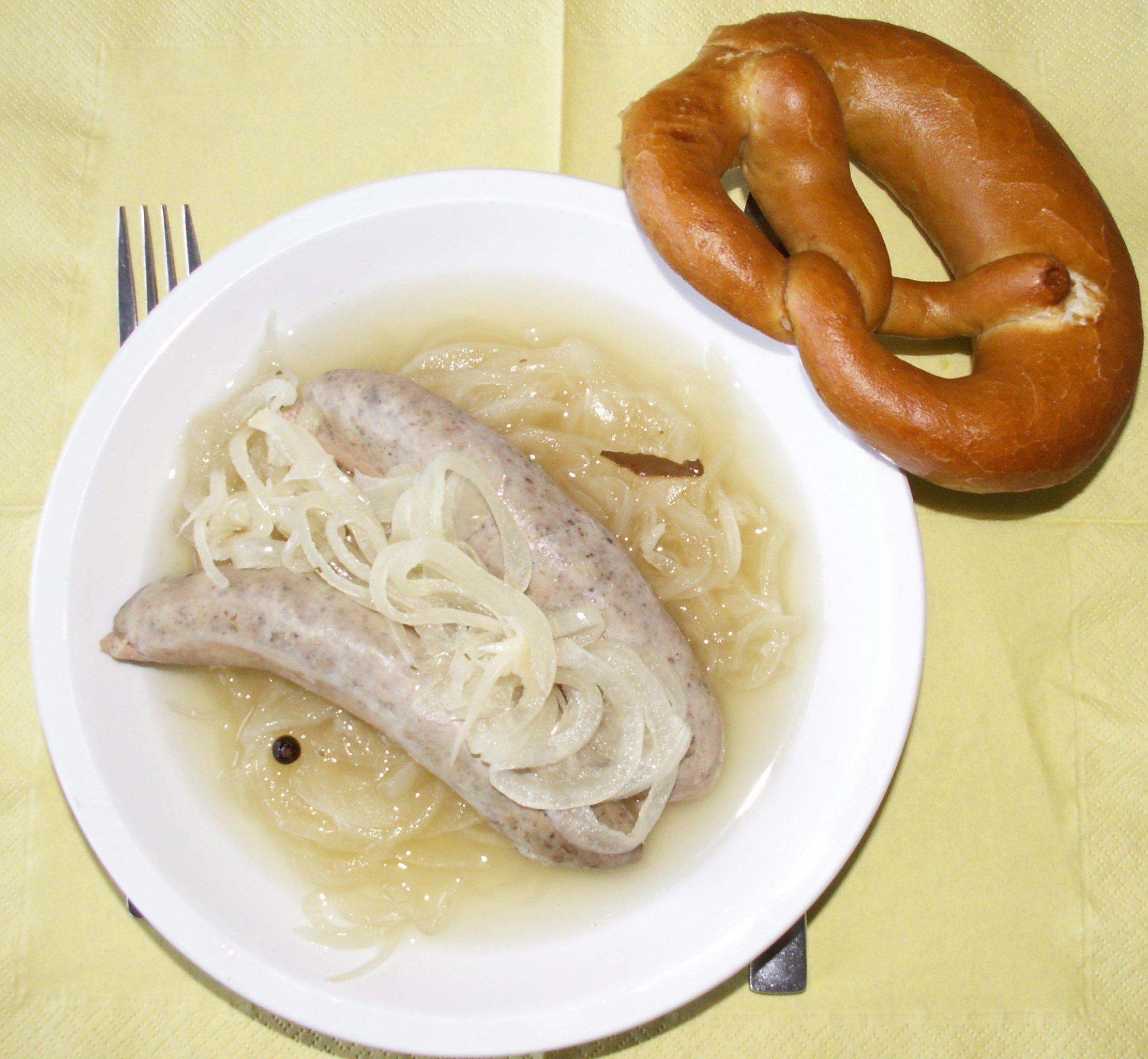
Saure Zipfel

Most people think of the typical and supraregional known "Nürnberger Bratwürste" when they think of Franconian food. These small sausages are made of pork and originate in the city zone of Nürnberg (and only this area is authorized to call the sausages "Nürnberger"). They are commonly served and eaten in threes: either as "Drei im Weggla" which means three sausages served in a roll or as a dish containing six of these sausages and cabbage. But beyond the famous "Nürnberger Bratwurst" Franconia produces a variety of other bratwursts, such as the bratwurst produced around Ansbach where the sausage is additionally flavoured with salt, pepper and marjoram. Other regions feature this spice as well e.g. in the region of Western Mainfranken, a thumb-thick and twelve centimeter long Bratwurst is eaten either alone or in pairs. In the area of Hof the small and much leaner "Hofer Bratwurst" is very popular and usually eaten in pairs. The city of Kulmbach features a similar sausage which, in comparison to the variety from Hof, contains a much higher share of veal. Another specialty which is only available in the area of Coburg is the "Coburger Bratwurst" which is similarly thick and coarse as the "Nürnberger" but is roasted on a pinecone fire and therefore acquires additional flavours through the smoke.

All of these sausage varieties are commonly grilled on a barbecue or in a pan and eaten with rolls and/or sauerkraut. Sometimes they are also served with mustard, either hot or medium or with horseradish. Though the addition of ketchup is especially popular with children, it is not traditionally used in Franconian cuisine.

A variation to prepare the sausages, though not so common beyond Franconia, is to stew them in vinegar stock which contains vinegar, water, onion rings, sliced carrots, salt, pepper, bay leaves and juniper berries. The sausages are simmered in the broth at a low temperature for about 15 to 20 minutes and then served under the name "Saure Zipfel" or "Blaue Zipfel" (which means sour or blue tips).

For a mid-afternoon snack (which is called "Brotzeit" in Bavaria) it is common to spread raw sausage meat on peasant bread and add diced onions as a topping with salt, pepper and paprika seed. In rural areas this is called Tartarbread though it has little in common with the real tartar which is made of raw beef.

== Other sausage types ==
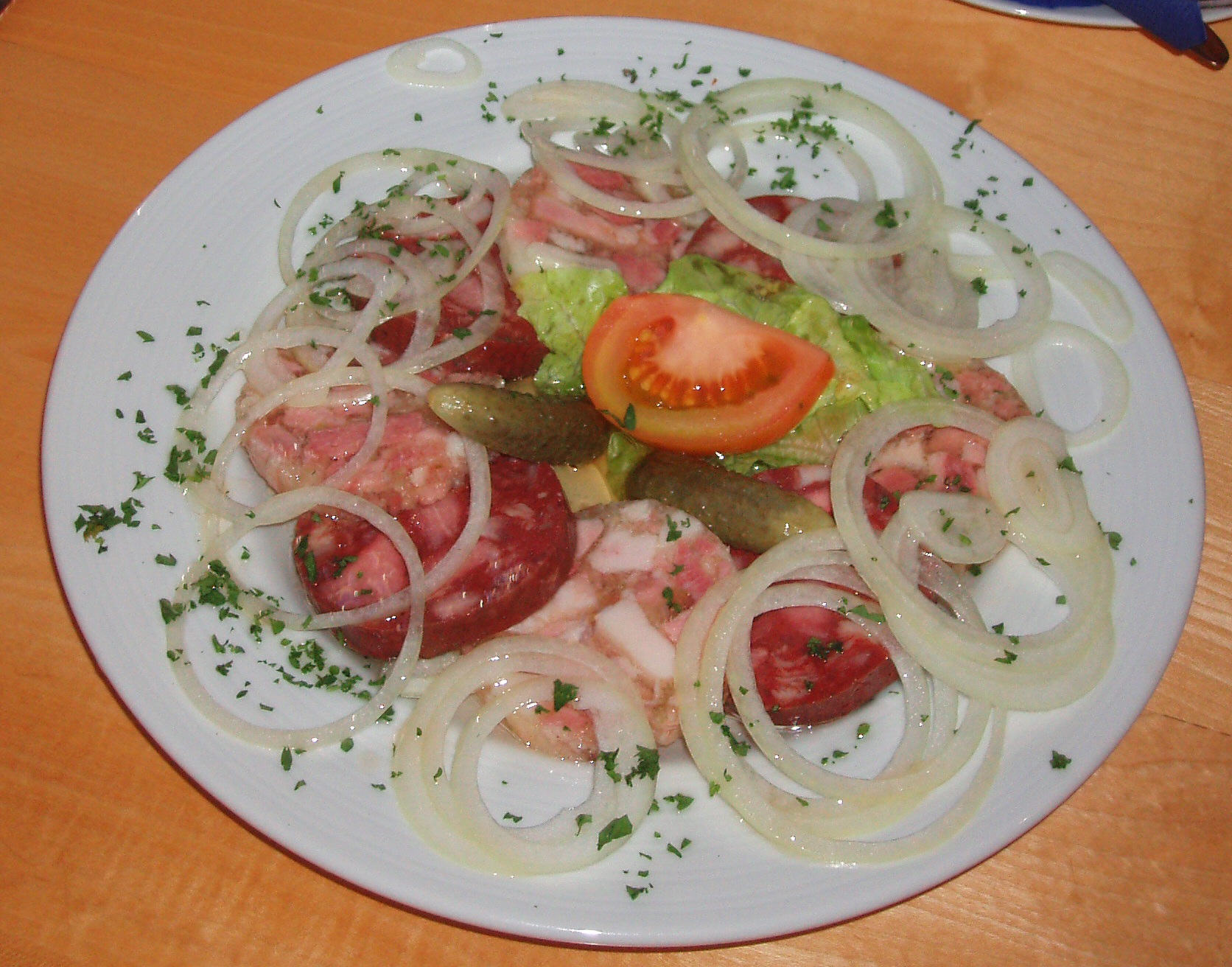
Pressack mit Musik

A typical Franconian Brotzeit dish is Pressack mit Musik (head cheese "with music"). "Mit Musik" refers to the onions, which are known to be flatulent. Also common are German Sülze, Blutwurst, Bierwurst, Stadtwurst, and Leberkäse.

== Carp ==
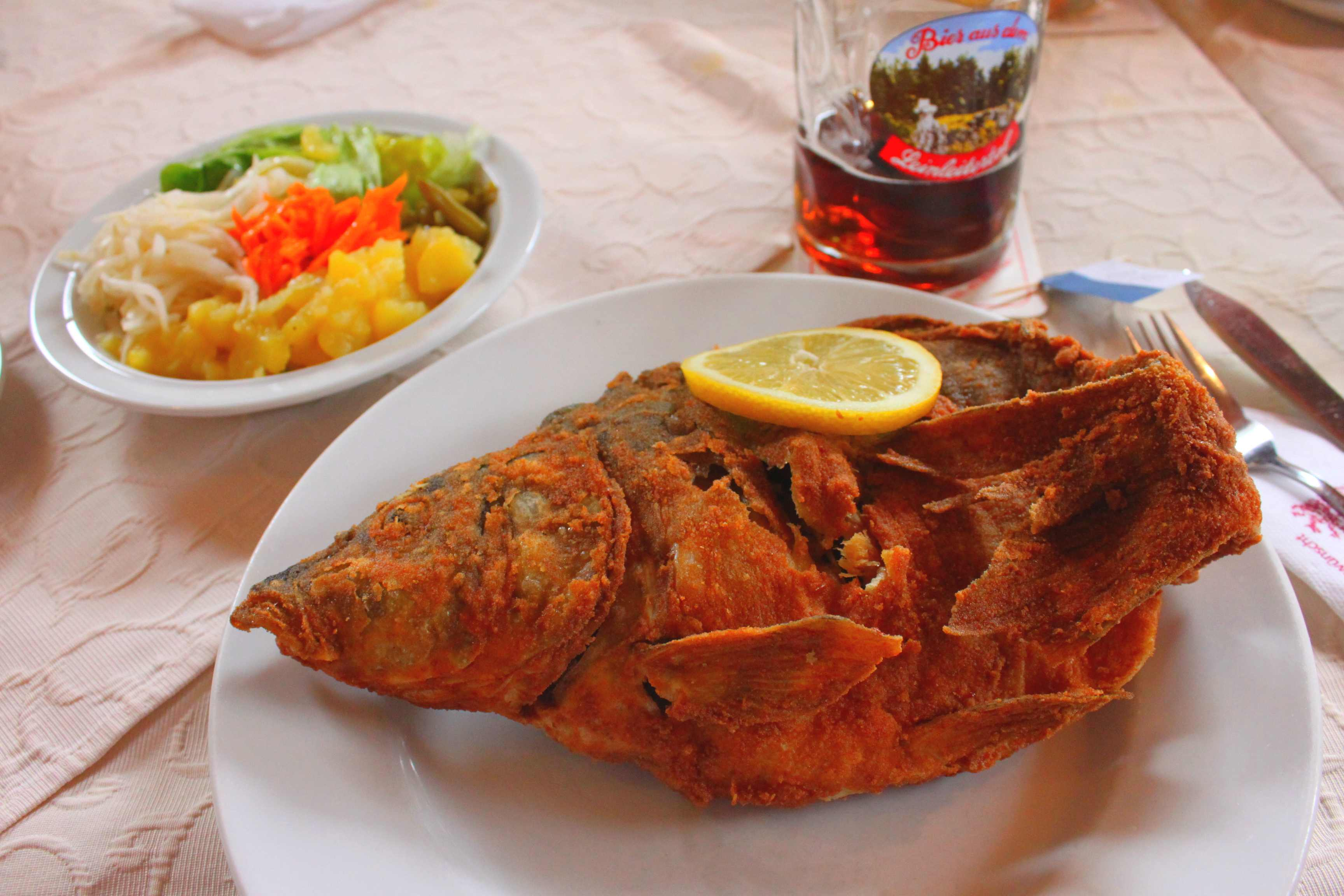
Baked carp

In the region of Forchheim and Bad Windsheim the mirror carp is a native. It is traditionally cut lengthwise and deep-fried or served blue which means that it is stewed in vinegar or beer stock. The fried roe of the fish is considered a delicacy and known under the name "Ingreisch" which means innards. As this is a very famous dish one should preorder it in most restaurants. To eat these specialities the best restaurants are those with own pools where the carp is kept and the best time is early autumn in the months September to November. After November the carp is most frequently imported from Eastern Europe and is therefore not as fresh as in the months before.

== Meat ==
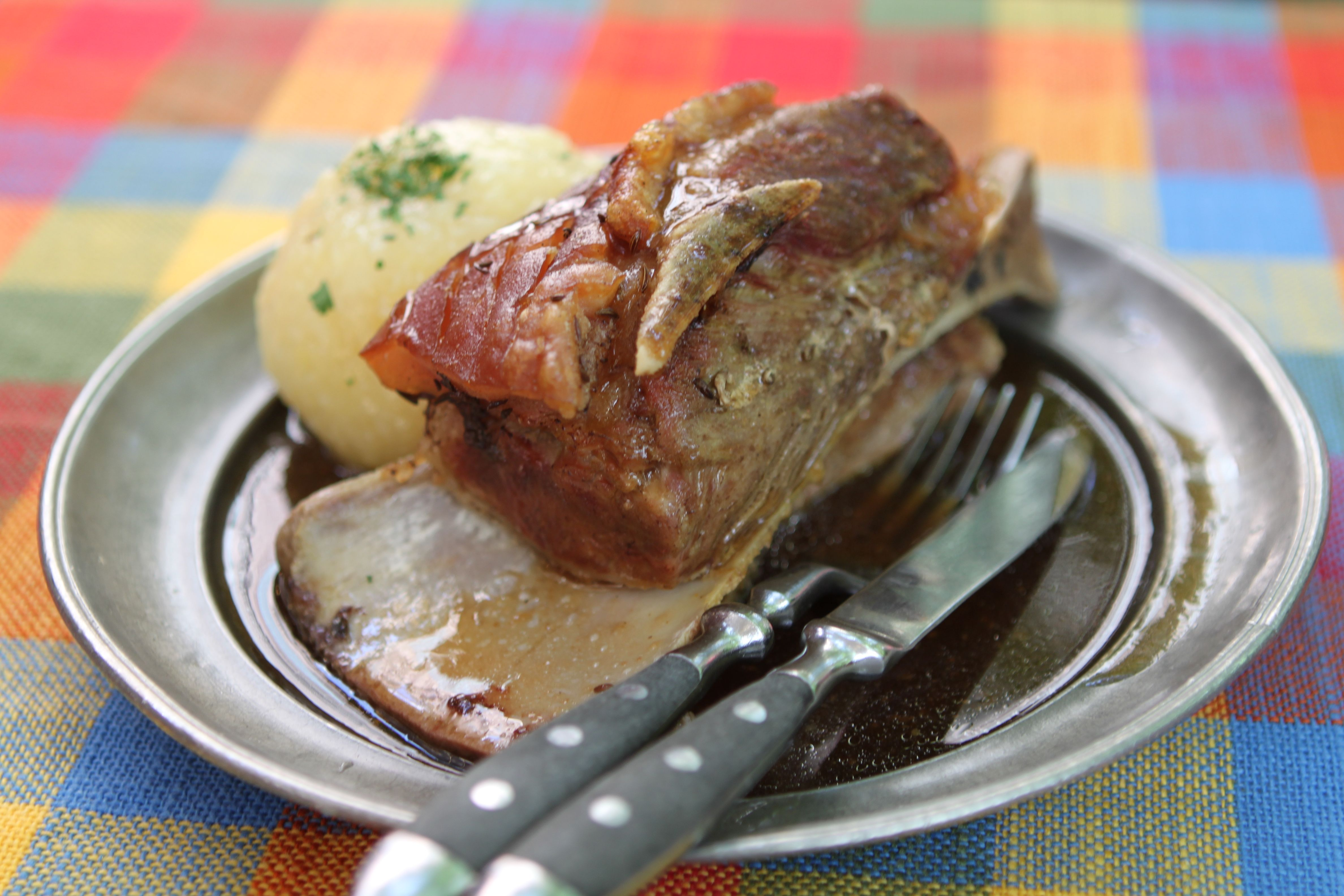
Franconian Schäufele

As in most of Germany's regional cuisines, many meat dishes are found in Franconia, especially from pork. Very well known are baked pork shoulders, the so-called "Schäufele" (because of the shovel-like shoulder blade) with its cross and cut rind. Also, the very popular one is the pork roast with crust and potato dumplings, which is also popular in Upper Bavaria, where it is served with sauerkraut while the Franconians serve it with red cabbage, savoy cabbage or green beans.

A speciality is also the "fränkische Sauerbraten". In contrast to the "rheinische Sauerbraten" it is prepared without the use of raisins, and the sauce is thickened with soaked and lightly sweetened ginger bread. This ingredient gives the dish its own typical flavour, which is then rounded off with red cabbage and in some regions the addition of lingonberry compote.

The recipe of the famous "Schweinfurter Schlachtschüssel" Is cooked pork meat served together with sauerkraut, fresh bread and ground horseradish on table-size wood plates. Common drinks include Franconian wine, and at the end each guest gets a portion of liver and blood sausages to take home.

Baked blood, also called "Schwaaß" is still a popular traditional dish, particularly in the area of Hof. The blood of the slaughtered animal is collected and then baked with diced bacon, onion, stale bread, marjoram, and salt. It is eaten with sauerkraut and potatoes as side dishes.

== Side dishes ==
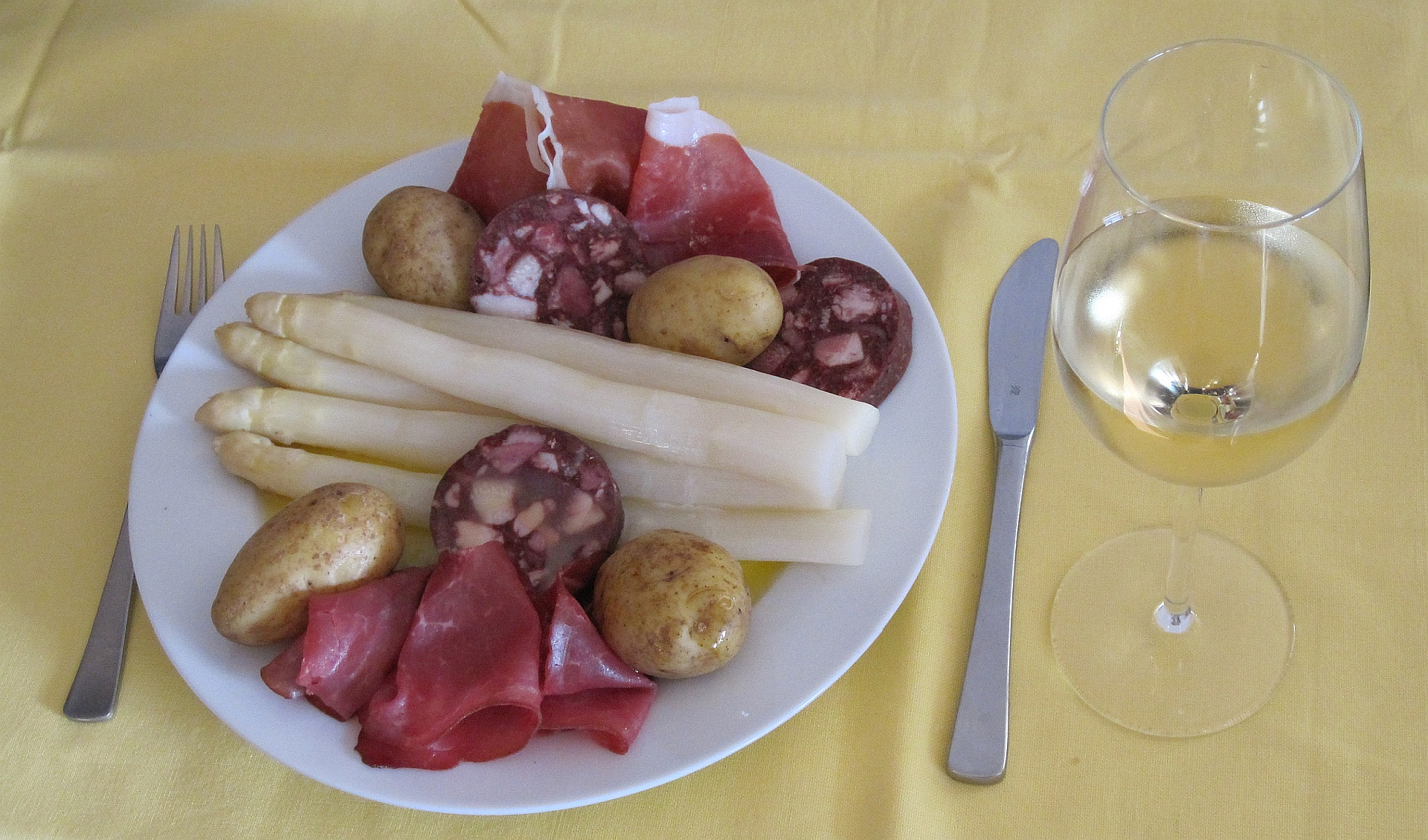
Asparagus with potatoes, ham, melted butter, red brawn and a glass of Silvaner

In Franconia it is a tradition to eat mixed salad and Klöße as a side dish to any roast. The special Rohe Klöße (lit. meaning raw Klöße) are prepared only with grated raw potato and filled with some dices of stale bread. If there are any Klöße left from the Sunday roast they are traditionally sliced and fried in a pan. Another traditional side dish are "Wickelklöße". These are made out of potato dough which is rolled out, spread with melted butter, sprinkled with breadcrumbs and then wrapped together and sliced into Kloß-sized pieces. They are considered a speciality from the region of Lower Franconia but eaten also in other regions. A third type of Klöße are Semmelklöße, which are made from mashed dry rolls soaked in milk and cooked. Instead of dumplings sometimes broad noodles (Bandnudeln) are served with roasts.

Vegetables are hardly ever a main but almost always a side dish. Very common are sauerkraut, white cabbage, red cabbage, savoy cabbage, Kohlrabi and also carrot. Salsify is also often featured in dishes, and has been grown in Franconia since the 17th century. In winter they are served in a cream sauce with ham and potatoes. In summer a variation of this dish is served but with asparagus originating in the region north of Nürnberg instead of the salsify. But the asparagus is also used in salads or is eaten with the famous Bratwurst.

A special side dish or condiment is horseradish which is called "Kren" in Bavaria. It is grown mainly in the areas around Erlangen, Forchheim and Höchstadt an der Aisch and Baiersdorf and is commonly used as a condiment in the sauce which is served with Tafelspitz.

== Soups ==
Typical Franconian soups are bread soup, semolina dumpling soup (German: Griesklöschensuppe), pancake soup (Flädlasuppe), and liver dumpling soup (Leberknödelsuppe). Another Franconian dish is a kind of steamed chanterelle (Saure Pfiffer).

== Salads ==
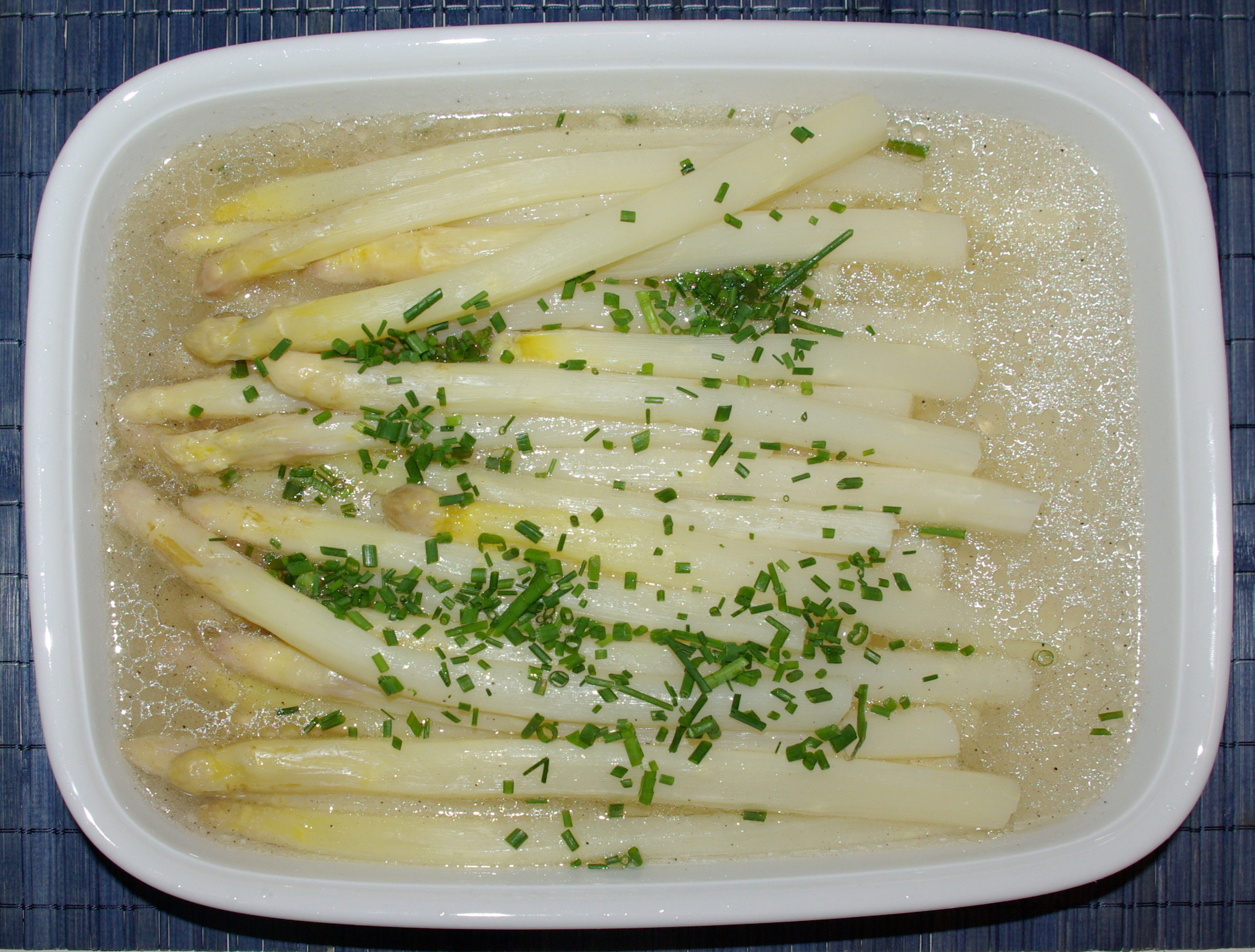
Asparagus salad from Franconia

Salads, which are usually served with a main dish include Franconian potato salad, which is made with Broth, mixed salad or Coleslaw (German: Krautsalat). A Brotzeit dish is the Wurstsalat (for example Nürnberger Gwerch).

== Drinks ==
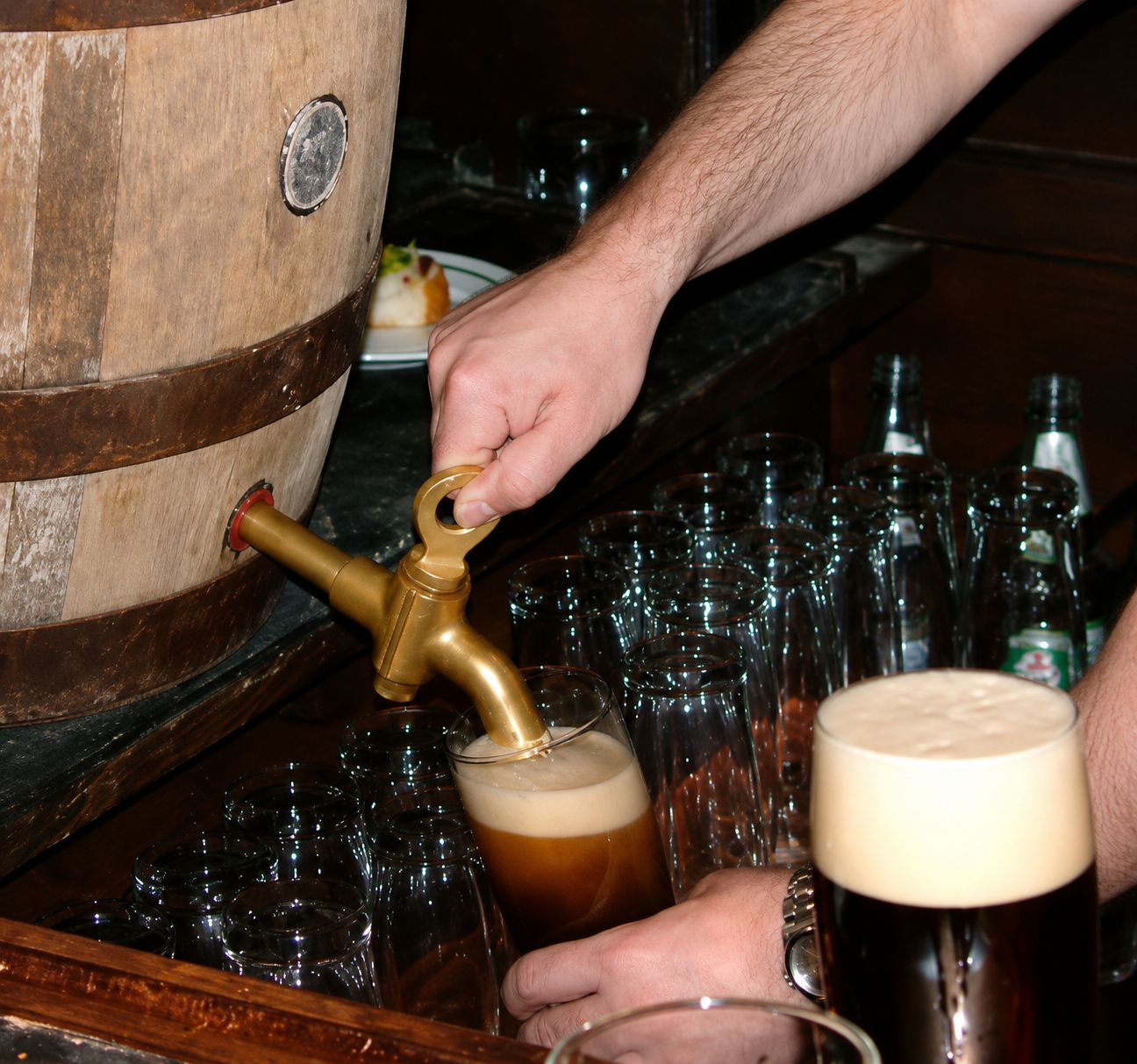
Rauchbier (smoked beer) being poured into glasses (Schlenkerla Brewery, Bamberg, 2003)

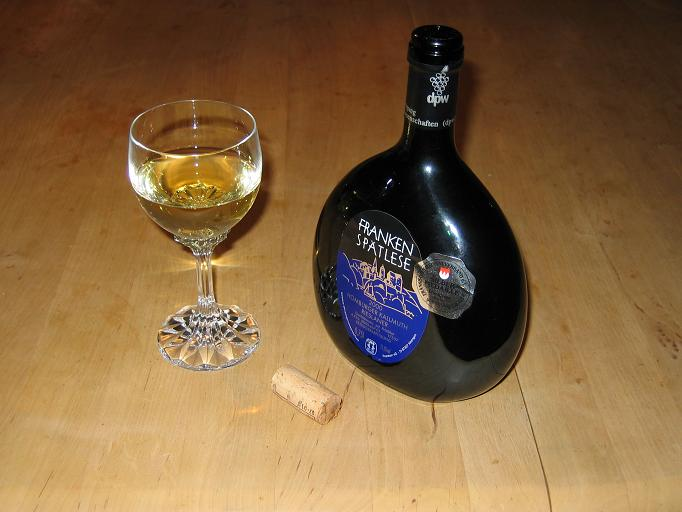
Franconian wine in its characteristic Bocksbeutel

Franconia is the home of about 270, often small, breweries. In summer the cellars open their doors and many restaurants offer a small mid-afternoon snack with a litre of beer (commonly called a "Maß") or a half litre (commonly called a Seidel). Upper Franconia has the highest concentration of breweries in the world. A large proportion of them are located in Franconian Switzerland. A local speciality from Bamberg is the famous Smoked beer (German:Rauchbier). The main beer types of Franconia are dunkel (German: Dunkles Bier) and pale lager (Helles Bier). Other types like wheat beer (German: Hefeweizen), märzen, or bock are also common.

The city of Kulmbach is also known as the "secret capital of beer" since one of the breweries there advertised their product with this slogan and in the city of Hof there are still 6 independent breweries in existence, while in Nürnberg there are only 4. The city of Bamberg tops the list with 12 breweries and only 70,000 inhabitants, and is therefore considered "Franconia's beer city", sometimes even Germany's beer city.

Wine is common in Lower Franconia around the River Main. Franconia is one of the German quality wine regions, and the wine of Franconia is typically bottled in bulbous Bocksbeutel-bottles, and the region is a wine-growing area especially famous for its white wine Silvaner, Bacchus, and Riesling, and the dry red wine Domina. During grape harvesting the Federweisser is another well-known regional variety.

Franconian Federweißer is an alcoholic beverage, made of grape juice that is still in the process of fermenting. Typically it has about 4 percent alcohol by volume. (The term in principle includes all stages of fermentation from must to finished wine.)

Typical spirits of Franconia are Obstbrände (also called Geist) or liqueurs, which are made of apples, plums (Zwetschgen) pears, or cherries.

== Bread ==
Similar to other German regions, Franconian bread types range from white wheat bread (Weißbrot) to grey (Graubrot) to black (Schwarzbrot), actually dark brown rye bread. The typical Franconian bread (Fränkisches Landbrot) contains both wheat and rye flour (hence Mischbrot, mixed bread). Characteristic for this bread is a high percentage of rye flavour, usually 80% and about 20% wheat flour and an aromatic spice mixture. The shape can be longish (Kipf) or round (Laib). The weight is usually around 1 - 4,5 kg. Pretzels and bread rolls are also common.

== Zwiebelkuchen ==
Franconian Zwiebelkuchen, which literally means onion cake, is a pie made of steamed onions, diced bacon, cream, and caraway seeds on a yeast dough.

== Lebkuchen ==
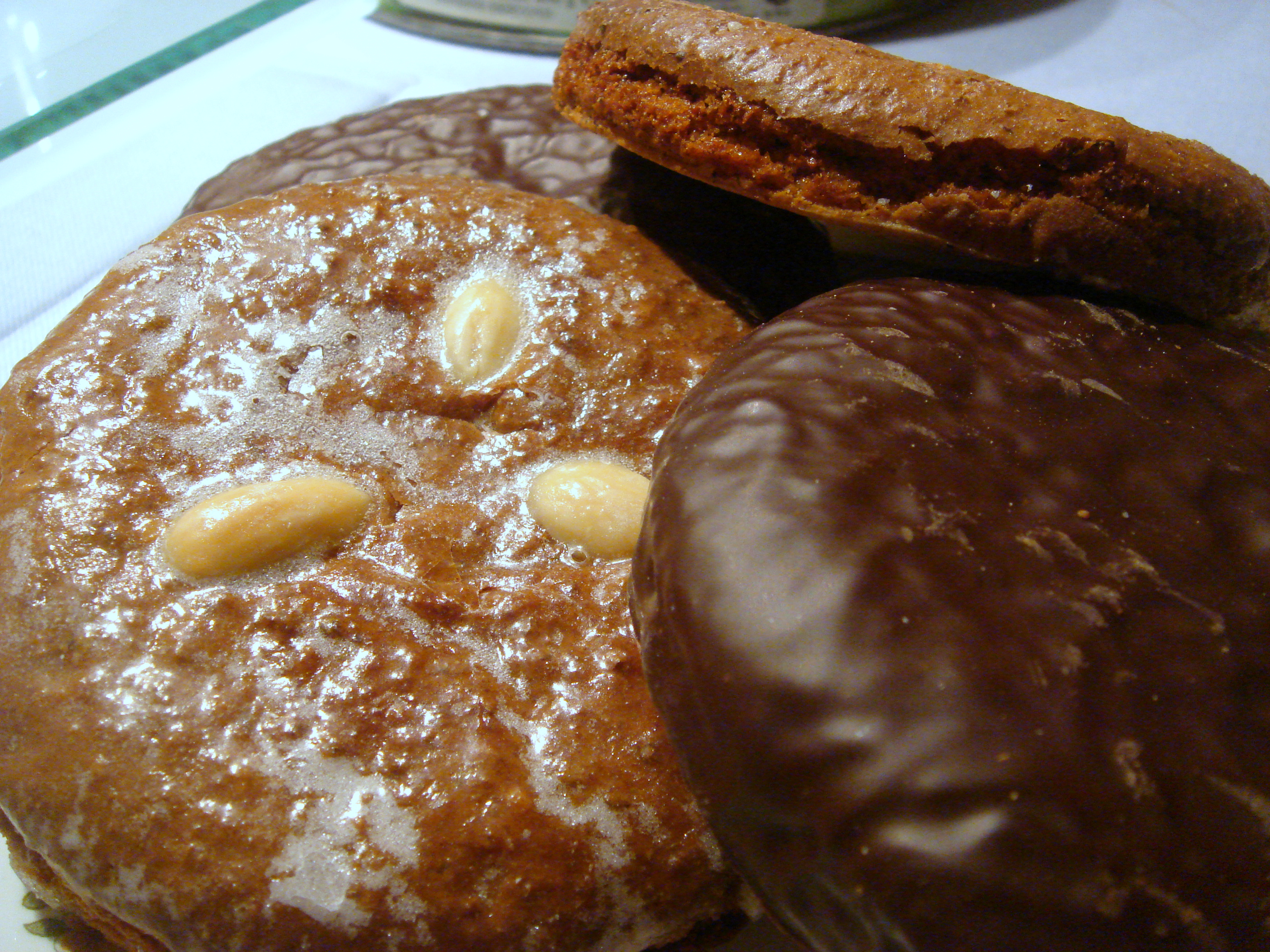
Nürnberger Lebkuchen

Ginger bread like Nürnberger Lebkuchen is one of the most famous delicacies of Franconian cuisine. In the Middle Ages Nuremberg (German: Nürnberg) was a trading centre also for exotic spices and other specialities. In the forest surround the city there were many beekeepers which supplied the markets with honey and especially because of these facts the long tradition on gingerbread-making originates in this city. From the end of August until winter time the little biscuits are offered with "Christkindlesmarkt-Glühwein" (mulled wine made with blueberries). Nowadays there are only a few small manufacturers left with artisanal production and the majority of the Lebkuchen are made in industrial production. During Christmas and advent season there are also several bakeries and confectioner shops producing their own Lebkuchen and other Christmas biscuits. The most common and most famous variety is the "Elisenlebkuchen" which often has a rectangular shape (most varieties are traditionally round-shaped). Very important are also the quality levels which are determined in the "Leitsätze für feine Backwaren" (Principles for pastries and baked goods) and the sophisticated quality level for Lebkuchen requires it to be made with wafers.

== Küchla (little cakes) ==
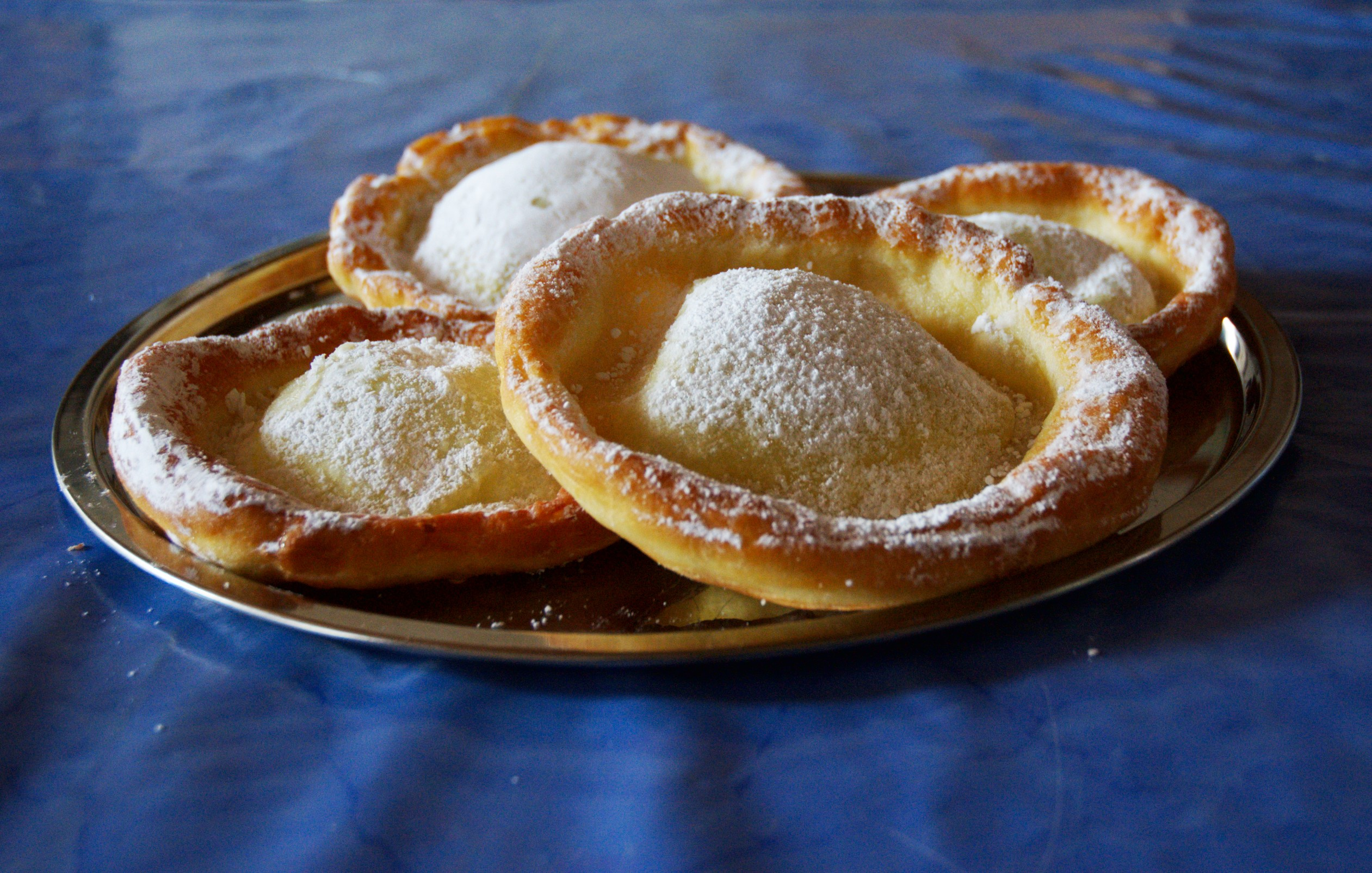
Küchla with confectioner's sugar

"Küchla" or "Küchle" (lit. meaning little cakes) are a supraregional popular specialty of Franconia, and are sweet, pan-fried yeast-dough pastry which is commonly prepared fresh on festive occasions.

There are several variations in existence: they may be rectangular, square, or round; the latter are most common and are also known as Knieküchla, which means "knee cakes". This name derives from the original method of preparation which required the baker to draw the yeast dough over his knee to obtain the typically thin crust of the Küchla. Nowadays it is either drawn over the back of the hand, a turned doughnut stick, or even a rubber ball. With this method, the round pastry is very thin in the middle and almost translucent, and its rim is quite bulbous and has a flavour quite similar to a doughnut. In the obtained shape, the Küchla are fried and typically served with powdered confectioner's sugar.

Rectangular Küchle, which are also called "Striezel", puff up during frying like a cushion, a process which is called rising. After frying, they have a thin and flat golden brown base, and a thicker, cushion-like upper part. As the Küchle are turned once during the cooking process, it is essential that the dough is without any defects; if there are only minimal ones and the dough tears during rinsing, the pastry will collapse and remain flat. These misshaped products are also called "Dutschen".

== Schneeballen ==
Schneeballen ("snowballs") are a type of shortcrust pastry especially popular in the area of Rothenburg ob der Tauber. Its name derives from its round, ball-like shape with a diameter of about eight to ten centimeters, and is traditionally decorated with confectioner's sugar.
