= Swabian cuisine =

German regional cuisine

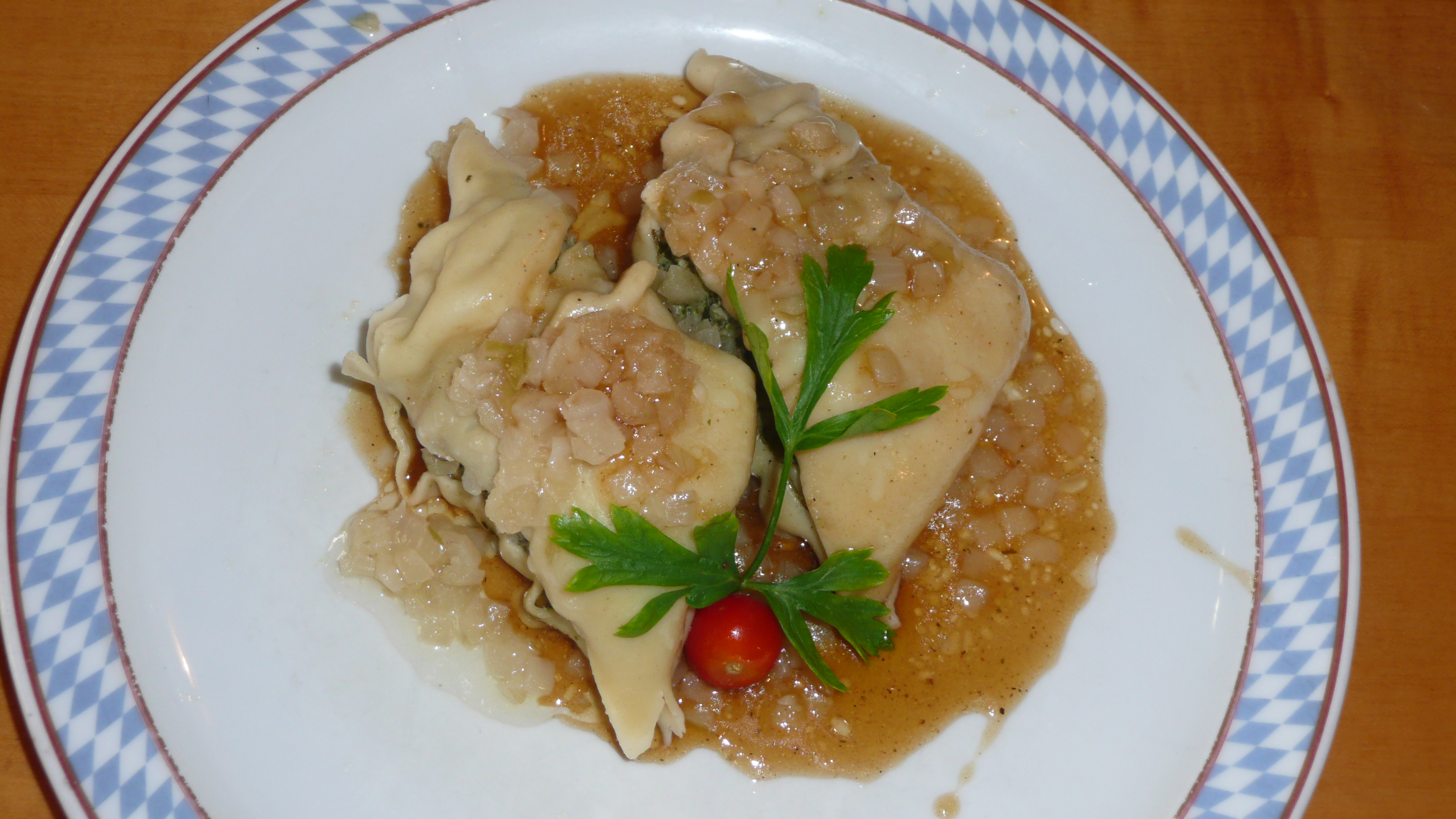
Swabian Maultaschen

Swabian cuisine is native to Swabia, a region in southwestern Germany comprising great parts of Württemberg and the Bavarian part of Swabia. Swabian cuisine has a reputation for being rustic, but rich and hearty. Fresh egg pastas (e.g., Spätzle noodles or Maultaschen dumpling wrappers), soups, and sausages are among Swabia's best-known types of dishes, and Swabian cuisine tends to require broths or sauces; dishes are rarely "dry".

== History ==
As soils were meagre and stony, conditions for raising cattle were poor. Meat, therefore, was something of a luxury for most, and was mainly consumed by the aristocracy and landowners, while the common people often had to be content with tripe where meat was concerned.

Regional influences on Swabian cookery abound. Old-Wurttemberg was pietistic, and the cuisine is therefore rather simple, as nutrition was prized above flavour, in keeping with Christian asceticism. In the Roman Catholic parts of Swabia, mainly influenced by Austria, the cuisine is more elaborate and features more opulent flour dishes. In the Plains of Hohenlohe fish, especially carp, is a local favourite. The cuisines of the former Empire cities Ulm, Augsburg, Ravensburg and Biberach are very diverse, with apparent Italian and French influence.

The potato was introduced in the mid-17th century, soon gaining popularity and integrated into the local cuisine. Many new recipes were developed, such as Schupfnudeln, potato salad and home fries.

The popular idea of traditional Swabian cuisine remains based on the stereotype of simple, hearty and uncomplicated "peasant food".

== Noodles and dumplings ==
Among Swabia's best-known dishes are Maultaschen (meat and spinach-filled dumplings either fried or served in broth) and Spätzle (fresh egg noodles). Fresh noodle products in a wide range of variations may comprise main dishes or may be served as side dishes.

=== Maultaschen ===
Maultaschen are dumplings filled with ground or minced meat, onion, spinach and soaked stale bread. Their nickname is Herrgottsbscheißerle, which means little God-cheaters, because as legend says they were first prepared by monks who wanted to evade the Lenten meat prohibition, and the monks supposedly thought that God could not see the meat inside the pasta. Maultaschen may be served in a hearty beef broth, or fried. Although they are eaten throughout the year, it is traditional to eat them on Good Friday.

=== Spätzle and Knöpfle ===
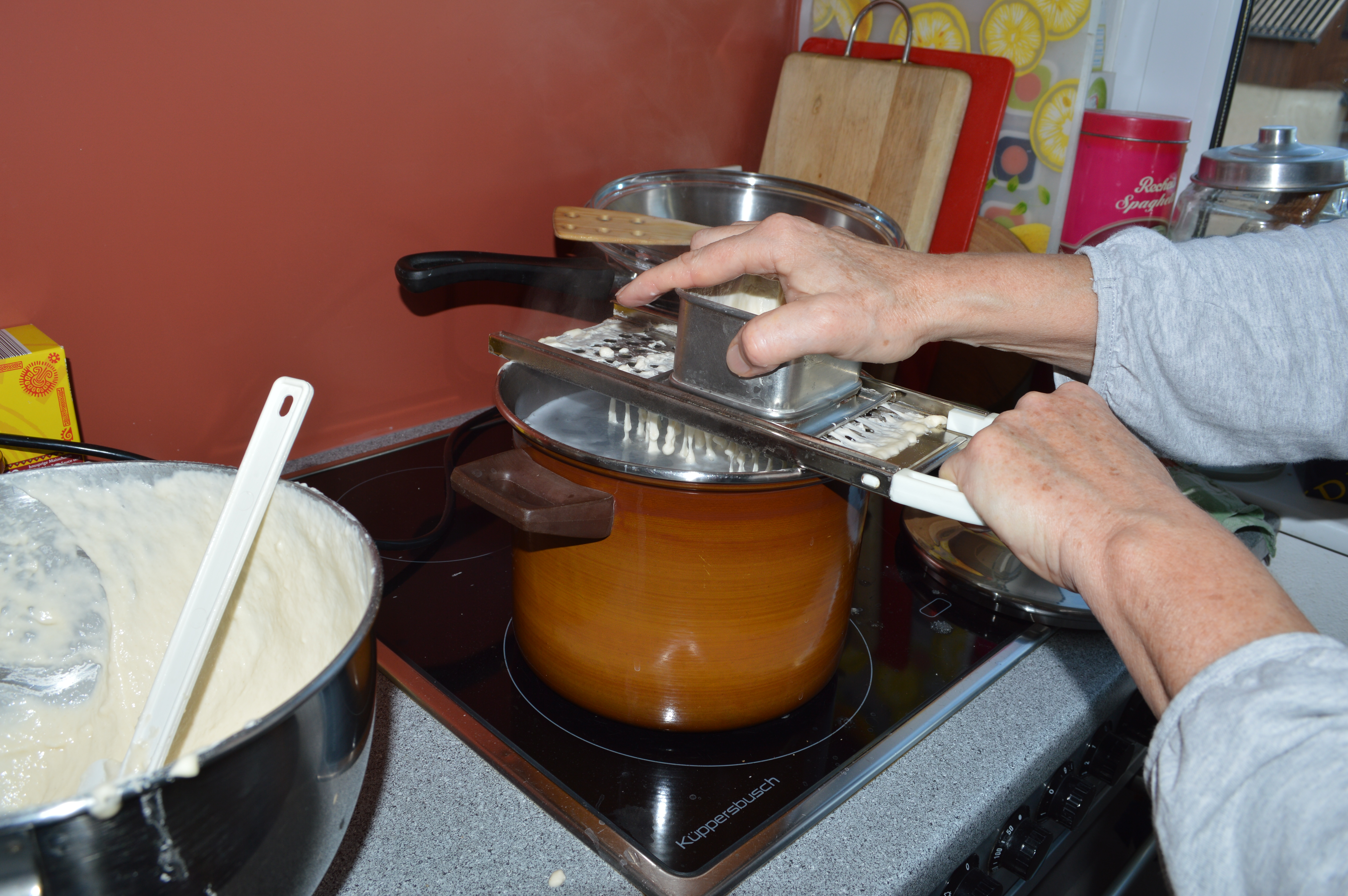
Spätzle dough or batter being scraped directly into boiling water in a home kitchen

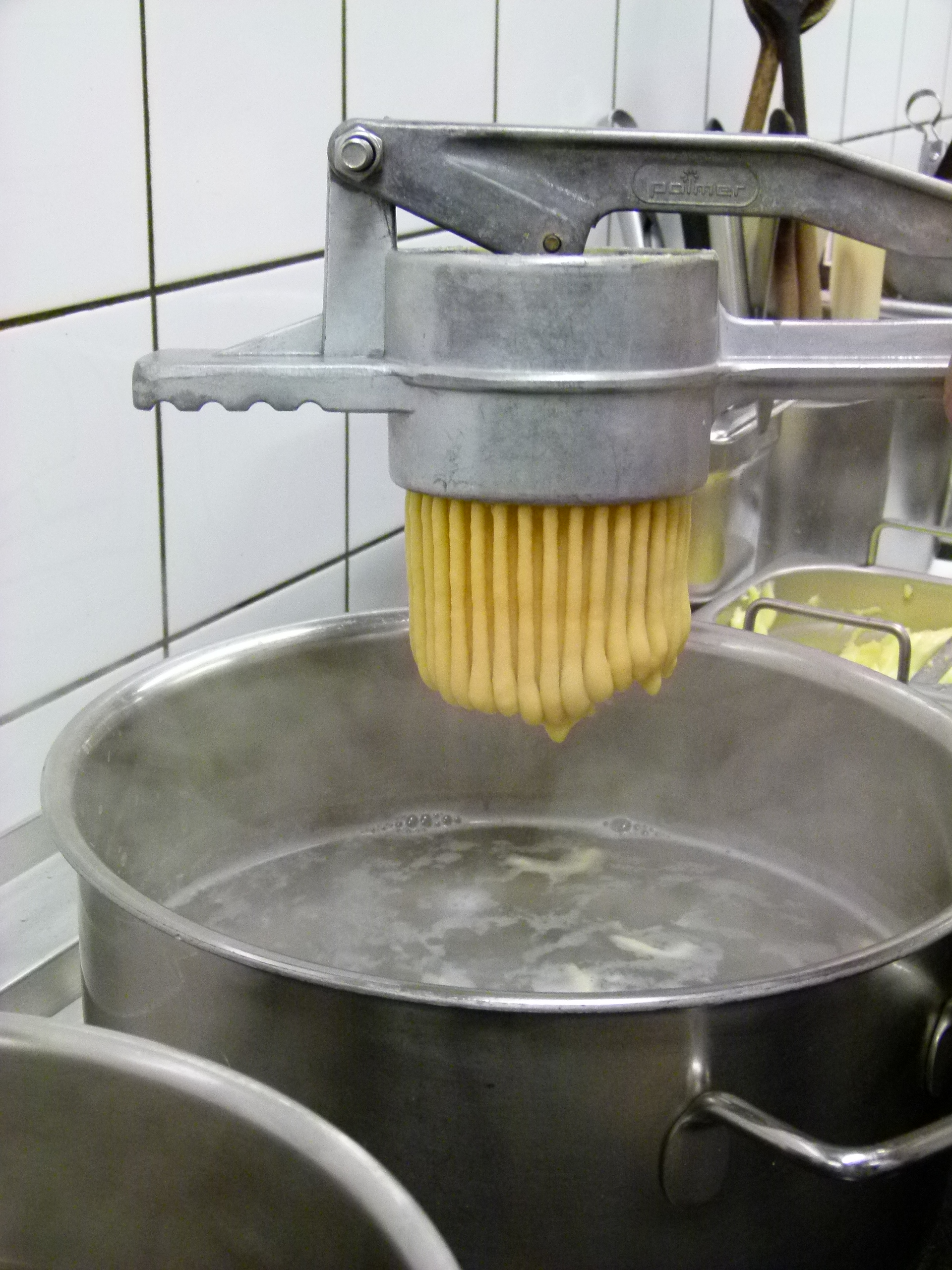
Spätzle being extruded directly into boiling water in a professional kitchen

Another very famous specialty is spätzle, which is to the Swabians a universal side dish to meat dishes with sauces, but also the main ingredient in stand-alone dishes. As an accompaniment to meat dishes, they are commonly garnished with roasted onions and breadcrumbs, which were browned in butter. A popular dish featuring spätzle as a main ingredient is Kässpätzle, which is spätzle that are cooked in salted water and then layered into a casserole with different kinds of cheese (commonly Emmentaler and Gruyère, or Weißlacker) and roasted onions. The kind of cheese used depends on the region in which it is being prepared.

As with many noodle products in Central Europe, spätzle can also be featured in sweet dishes combined with sugar, apple sauce or other fruit preserves, but they are more commonly seen in savoury dishes.

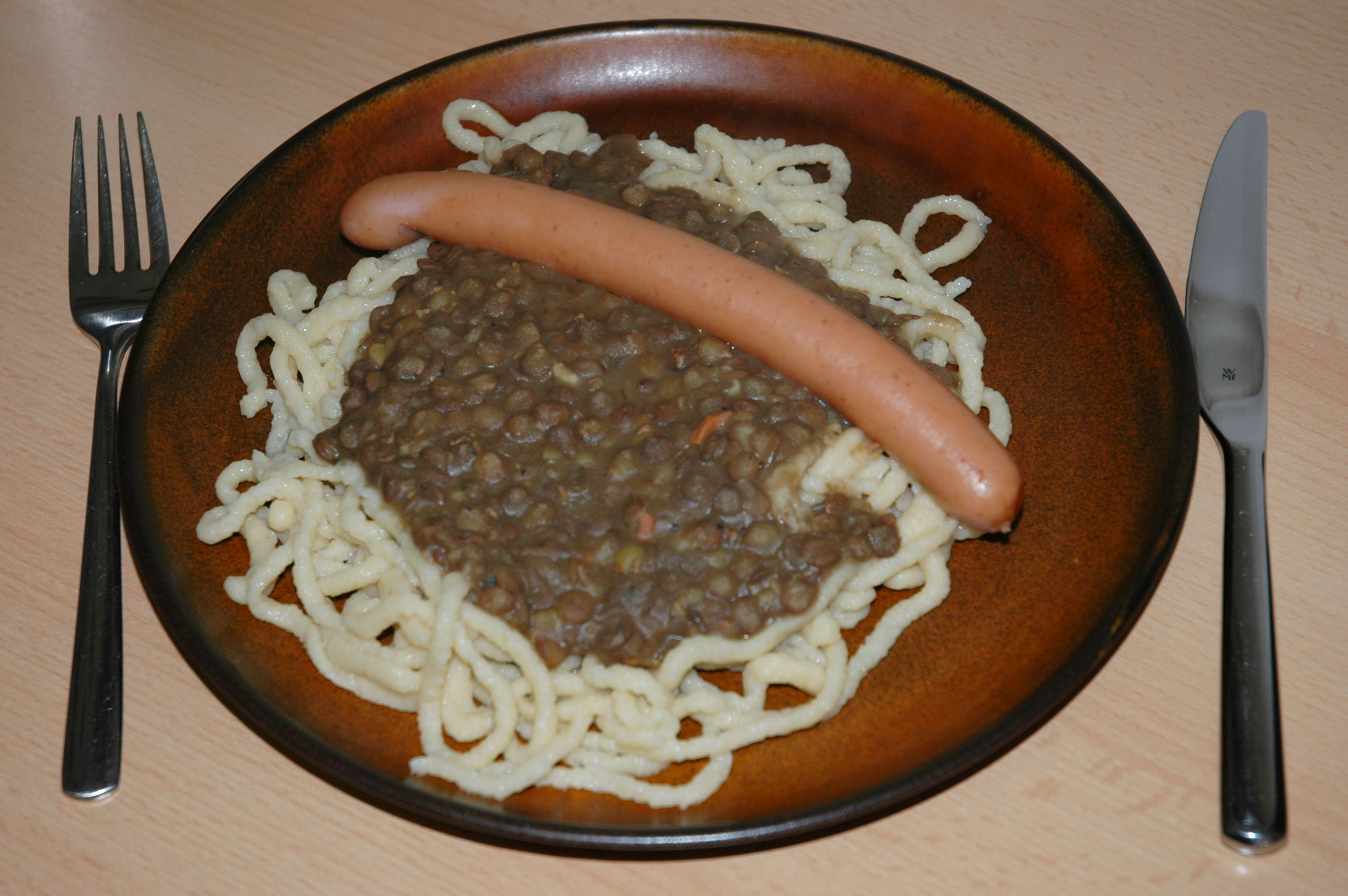
Lentils and Spätzle with sausage

Also originally Swabian is Linsen mit Spätzle, a dish featuring lentils cooked in a vinegar broth and served over spätzle. They are often served with Vienna sausages or smoked bacon.

Spätzle is prepared by scraping the fresh pasta down in thin bands from the "Spätzlesbrett" (a simple wooden board), but nowadays there are special "Spätzlepresse"s available, (which are similar to potato ricers). Shorter Spätzle and the thick, round Knöpfle are prepared with a Spätzlehobel, which is a board with little holes through which the dough is pushed, directly into the boiling water.

Spätzle and Knöpfle can be served directly after cooking but usually they are briefly tossed in liquid butter before serving. The dough contains wheat flour, egg and water although occasionally ingredients, such as spinach or tomato puree, are used for colouring.

=== Schupfnudeln ===
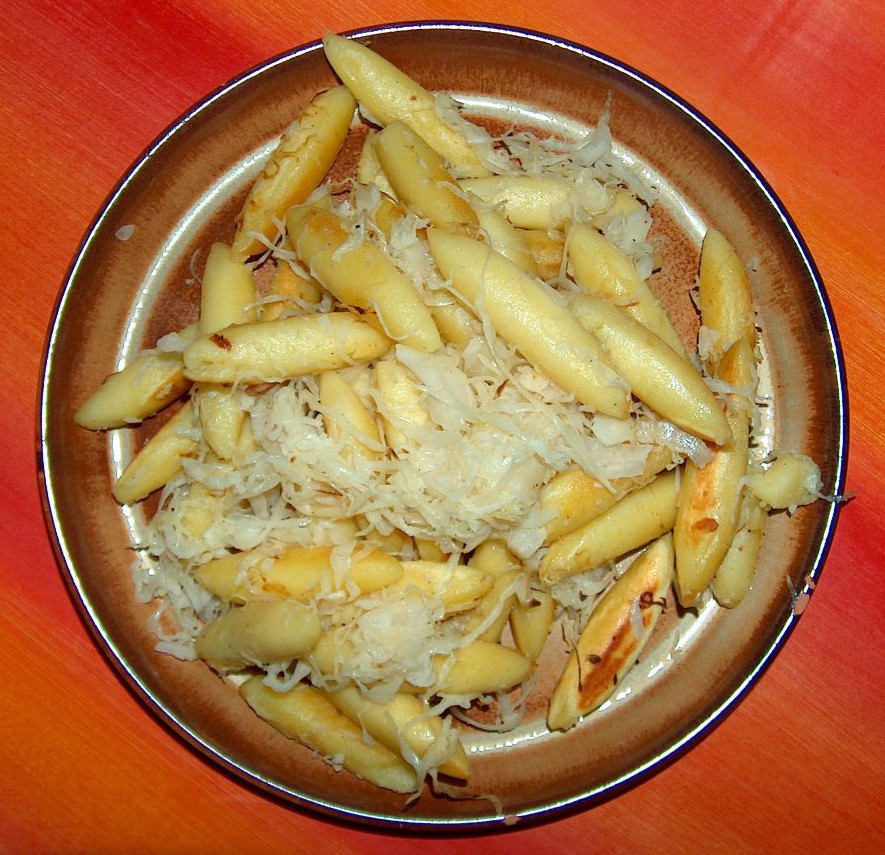
Schupfnudeln with sauerkraut

Also called Buabaspitzla, Schupfnudeln are another particularity of the cuisine of Upper Swabia and the Allgäu. They are made of a dough which contains equal parts of flour and potato and their shape is oblong with tapered ends. They are cooking by boiling in salted water, but may also be combined with saurkraut and bacon, and pan-fried. This is called "Krautschupfnudeln" (lit., "cabbage schupfnudeln") and are eaten during carnival, and on the Kermesse festival. They may also be served with sweet accompaniments, either pan-fried or boiled: they are commonly eaten with melted butter, cinnamon sugar, apple sauce or fruit preserves.

=== Pancakes ===
Pancakes are also called Flädle and are usually very thin and fried in oil. They may be eaten as a whole with savory or sweet accompaniments, or cut in stripes and added to soups.

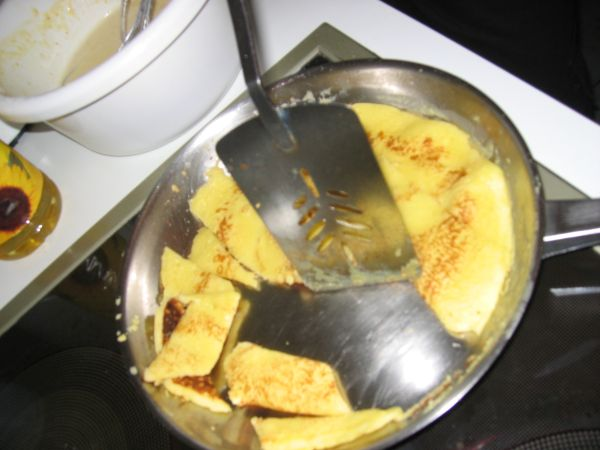
Kratzete

Another type of pancake is the Kratzete. They are not only eaten as a sweet dish but may also be eaten as an accompaniment to asparagus.

== Soups and stews ==
Soups and stews are essential parts of Swabian food culture. The fact that soups and stews are loved by Swabians lead to the nickname Subbaschwôb which means "Soup Swabian". In fine dining, they are usually served as an appetizer, but in home cooking they are usually a main dish, served with bread.

=== Gaisburger Marsch ===
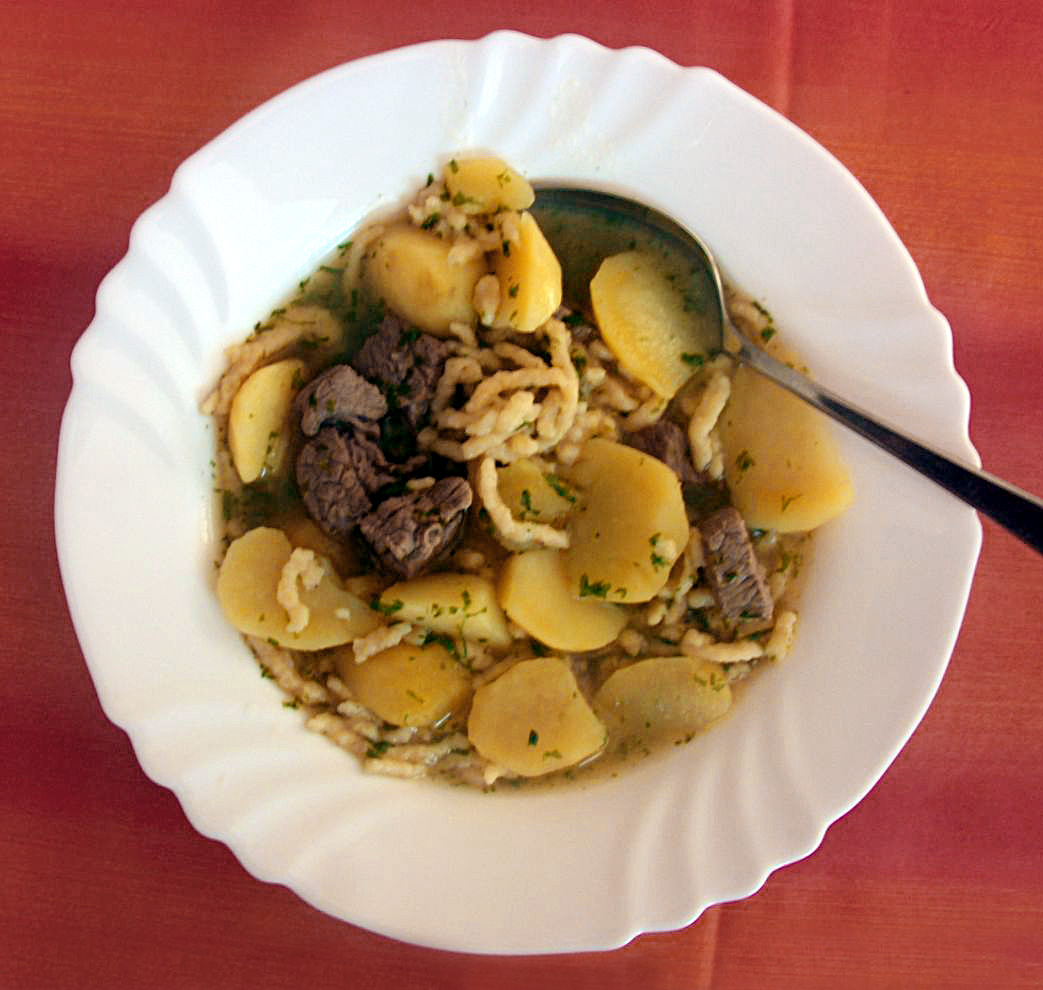
Gaisburger Marsch

One of the most popular Swabian stews is Gaisburger Marsch, a nourishing stew with diced ox meat, cooked potatoes and Spätzle. The certain something is the garnish consisting of fried onions topping the soup. Legend says that the stew was first served to hungry soldiers in Gaisburg in the 19th century and became so popular that soldiers stationed more distantly marched all the way to Gaisburg to enjoy it. Thus, the name "Gaisburger Marsch" means "March to Gaisburg".

=== Flädle soup ===
Thin pancakes are cut into slices and are added to a clear broth. As they absorb the broth very quickly, they are added just before serving.

== Meat and fish specialities ==
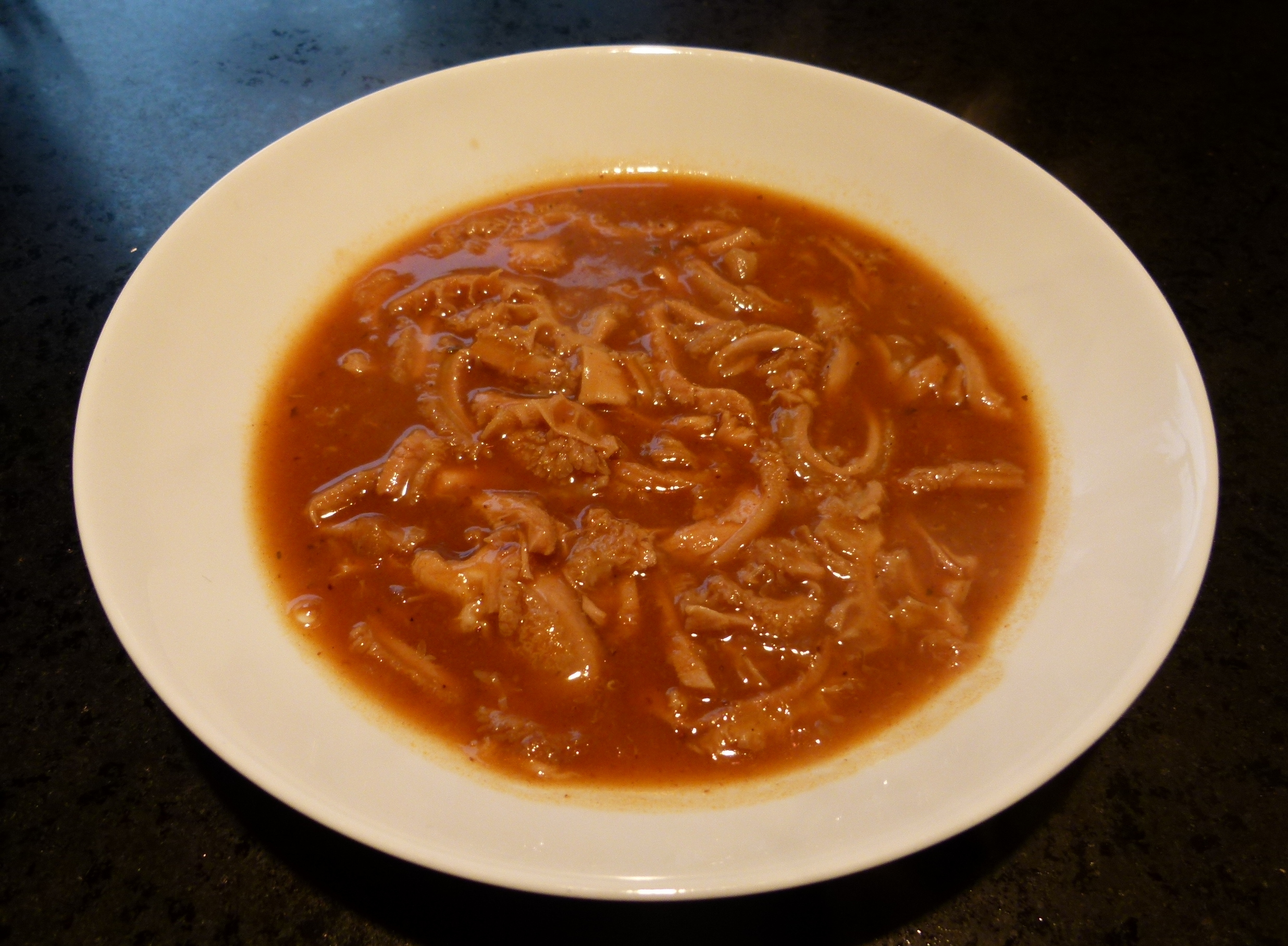
Swabian "Saure Kutteln" beef tripes in red wine

Although not much meat was historically used in the kitchen, there are still some regional specialties with meat; for instance, roast lamb with spätzle. Many recipes use tripe, which was inexpensive and therefore affordable for the common and poorer people. Very well known (although not universally loved) are Saure Kutteln, tripe cut into slices, steamed with roux and then soured with vinegar or wine.

Other famous dishes using tripe are "Saure Nieren" (lit. sour kidneys) and "Saure Leber" (sour liver), both prepared by cutting the offal in slices, pan-frying, and serving with a sauce, alongside spätzle or home fries, and a green salad.

The Swabian Wurstsalat is an assortment of sausages that are sliced, mixed together with onion, pickles and chives, and dressed with oil and vinegar, and eaten with bread.

Fish dishes are often made with Bodenseefelchen (freshwater fish in the salmon family), which are caught in the Lake Constance. They are often pan-fried in butter, but can also be served steamed or smoked.

== Miscellaneous dishes ==
Filderkraut is a special variety of pointed cabbage grown on the Filder, a plain near Stuttgart, and used to make sauerkraut and salads.

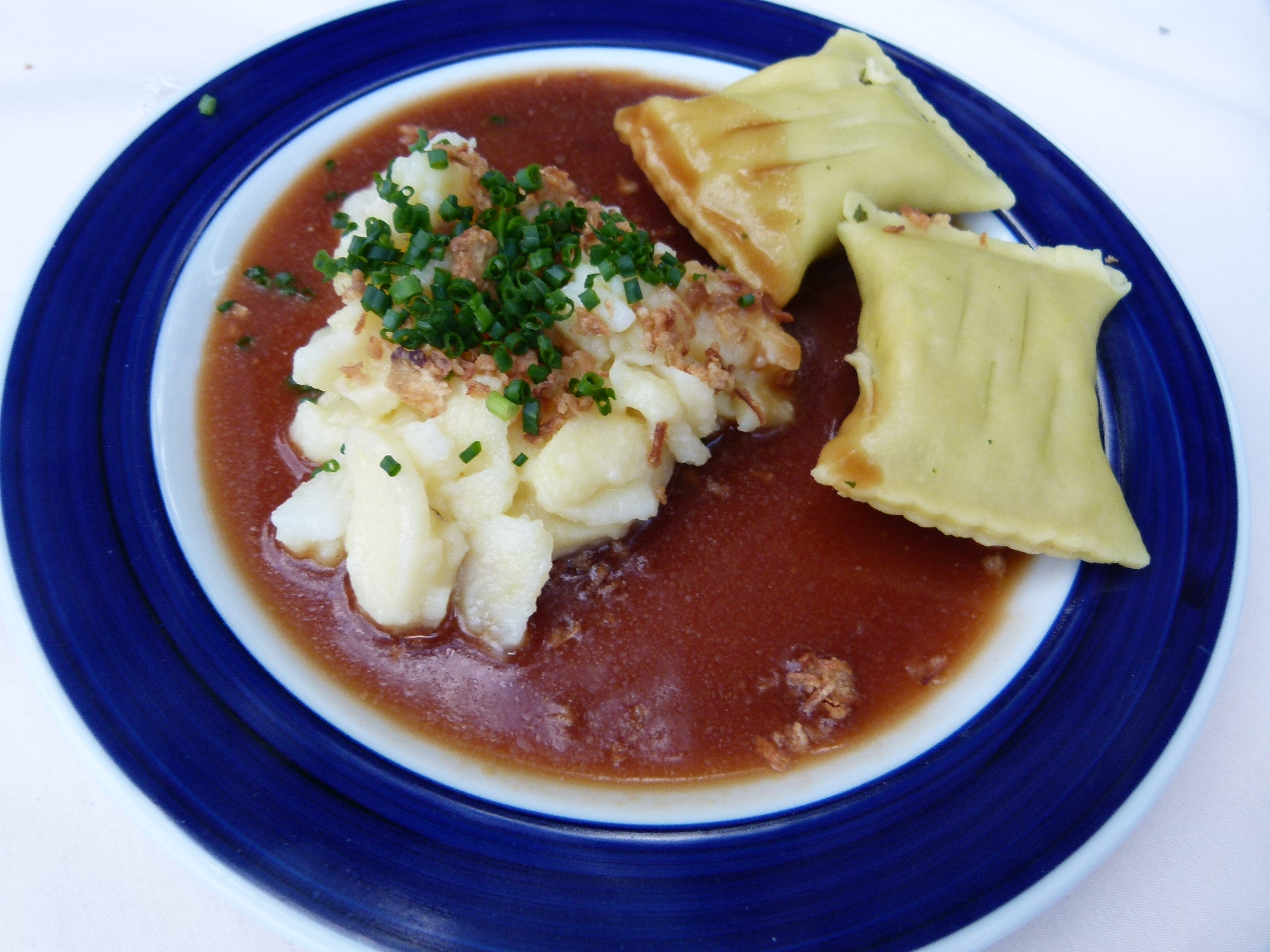
Swabian potato salad with Maultaschen

The Swabian potato salad is also very famous in Germany and even in other countries. In contrast to the mayonnaise-dressed potato salad in Northern Germany, it is lighter and contains less fat. Waxy potatoes are cooked and peeled when they are still hot. Then they are sliced and mixed with diced onions before pouring warm broth, vinegar and oil in succession over the potatoes and onions. Optionally, it can be garnished with chives or diced pickles, or spiced with mustard. The salad should rest for a few hours or even overnight before serving and can then be enjoyed as accompaniment for different dishes or solely with bread.

Brenntar was a Swabian staple foodstuff, particularly prominent in the Swabian Jura and in the Allgäu. It is made of a specially roasted flour called Musmehl.

== Sweet dishes ==
Ofenschlupfer (lit., "oven slipper") is a kind of bread pudding consisting of stale white bread spiced with sugar, vanilla, and cinnamon, which is layered in a casserole dish with apple, raisins, and almond biscuits, and then soaked in an egg and cream-based custard before being baked in the oven.

Kirschenplotzer comprises stale white buns, worked into a dough with butter, egg, milk, and sugar, into which cherries are folded before the casserole is baked, and then served hot.

Pfitzauf is also a dish prepared in the oven. This is a kind of soufflé prepared in special Pfitzauf moulds and commonly served with applesauce or vanilla sauce, although there are also savory recipe variations with cheese or bacon.

Nun's puffs are small round doughnuts made of a yeast dough or choux pastry, and fried. They are traditionally eaten during Carnival and may be served as a main dish or a dessert served with icing sugar, cherries, or vanilla sauce.

Beignets are also very famous, and are commonly prepared with apples and served with vanilla sauce.

== Baked goods ==
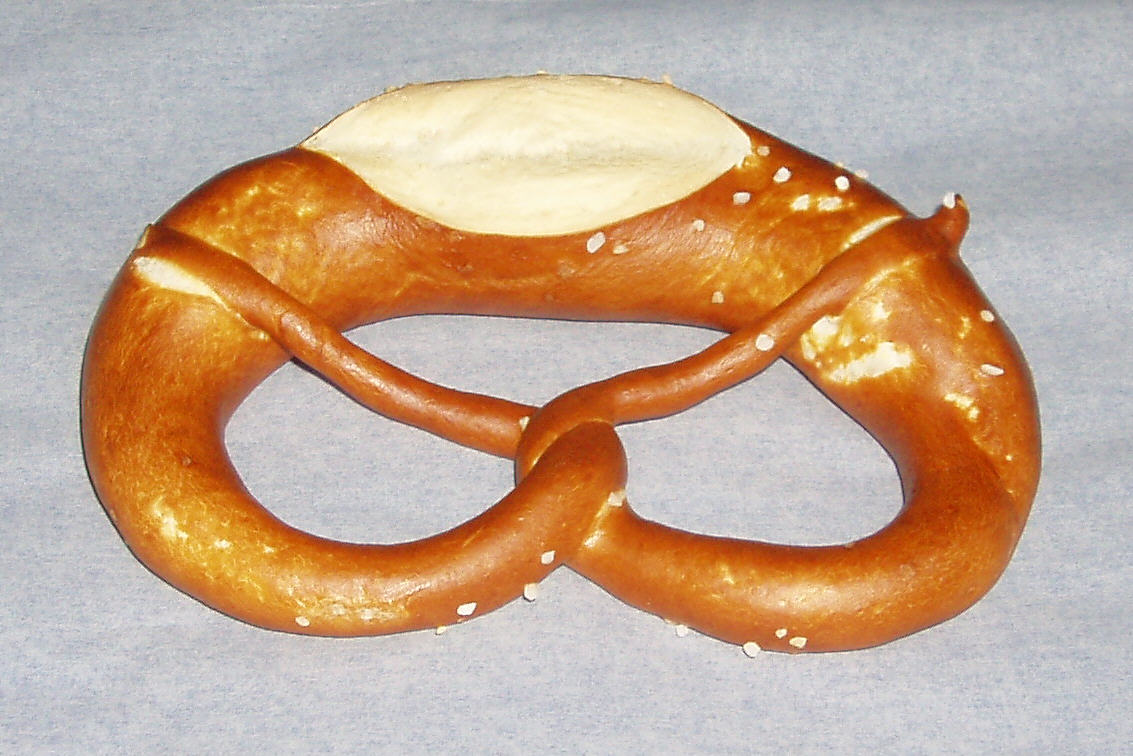
Pretzel

=== Bread and pastries ===
Swabian baking culture boasts a broad range of different breads. There are many variations that are not widely distributed or known, and are only baked in a particular area or village. There are some baked goods made throughout the region, and widely available in bakeries: these include Laugengebäck, pretzels, bread rolls, and Hefezopf (lit., "yeast plaid").

The Swabian "Seele" (lit., "soul") is a baguette-like white bread made from spelt with its origin in Upper Swabia. It is prepared from a very high-hydration dough from spelt flour, yeast, water, and salt, and formed into an elonged loaf and sprinkled with caraway seed and coarse salt. After baking, it is crispy on the outside and very light and fluffy on the inside. It also stays moist inside due to the high gluten content of spelt flour.

Briegel is a very similar baked good that is native in East Wurttemberg, and is even moister than the Seele. It also belongs to the species of moistened breads such as Wasserwecken and Knauzen from Wendlingen.

Another speciality which is native to Reutlingen is the Dreikönigsmutschel, (lit., "Three Kings Mutschel"), a star-shaped, bland yeast pastry with eight points and a round elevation in the middle which is the circle of a braided garland. It is traditionally eaten on the Thursday after Epiphany and people play dice to eat it and celebrate.

=== Savory cakes ===
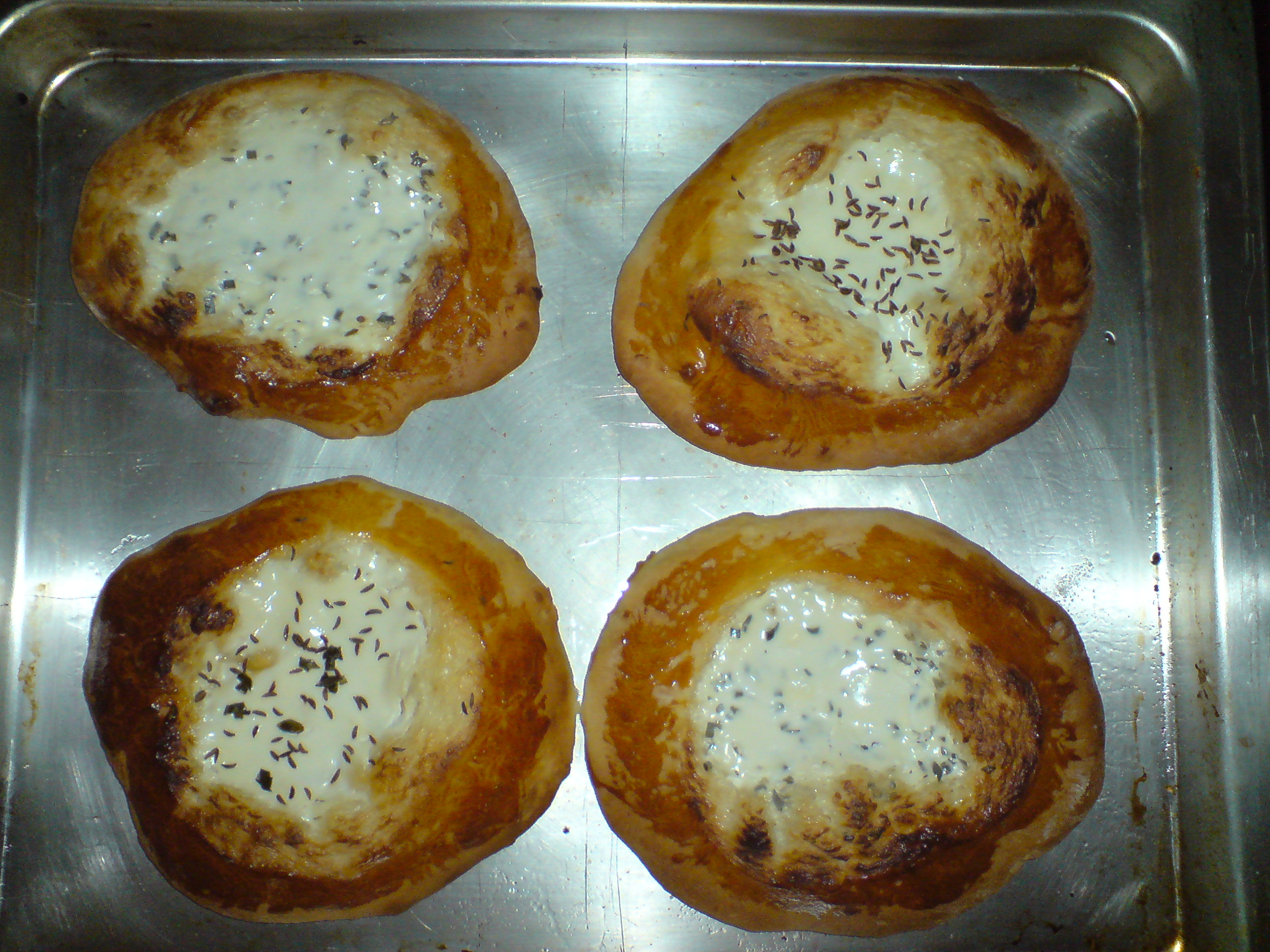
Bätscher

The Swabian Cream Cake is a thin yeast flatbread spread with sour cream and topped with onion or leek and bacon, very similar to the Flammkuchen from Alsace. The topping may vary and some add egg or caraway seed. In the Heilbronn area, a variation called "Peterlingkuchen" (parsley cake) is popular and as the name suggests, this flat bread is topped with parsley. The name also differs depending on the locale, with variations being Dennetle, Dinnette, Blooz, and Bätscher.

Also well-known is the Swabian Zwiebelkuchen, which is very similar to the French quiche Lorraine. It is usually eaten in late summer and autumn with Federweisser or apple cider.

=== Sweet cakes ===
There are a variety of cakes prepared in Swabian homes, since the German tradition of Sunday afternoon Kaffee und Kuchen is widely practiced by Swabians. Also very popular is the Swabian Träubleskuchen, a cake with a shortcrust pastry base and a filling of redcurrants, beaten egg whites and ground hazelnuts.

== See also ==
- Alb-Leisa

== Literature ==
- Schwaben, Kulinarische Streifzüge, H-D. Reichert, D. Wägerle, H-J. Döbbelin, Sigloch-Verlag, Blaufelden, 2005, ISBN 3893930701
- Schwäbische Küche, G. Poggenpohl, Verlag EDITION XXL, Fränkisch-Crumbach, 2003, ISBN 3-89736-140-X
- Schwäbisch kochen, Karola Wiedemann, Martina Kiel, Gräfe und Unzer Verlag, München, 2010, ISBN 978-3-8338-1630-7
- Die schwäbische Küche – Regionale Spezialitäten, Matthias F. Mangold, Kosmos Verlags-GmbH, Stuttgart, 2011, ISBN 978-3-440-12587-8
