= Regensburger Wurst =

German pork sausage

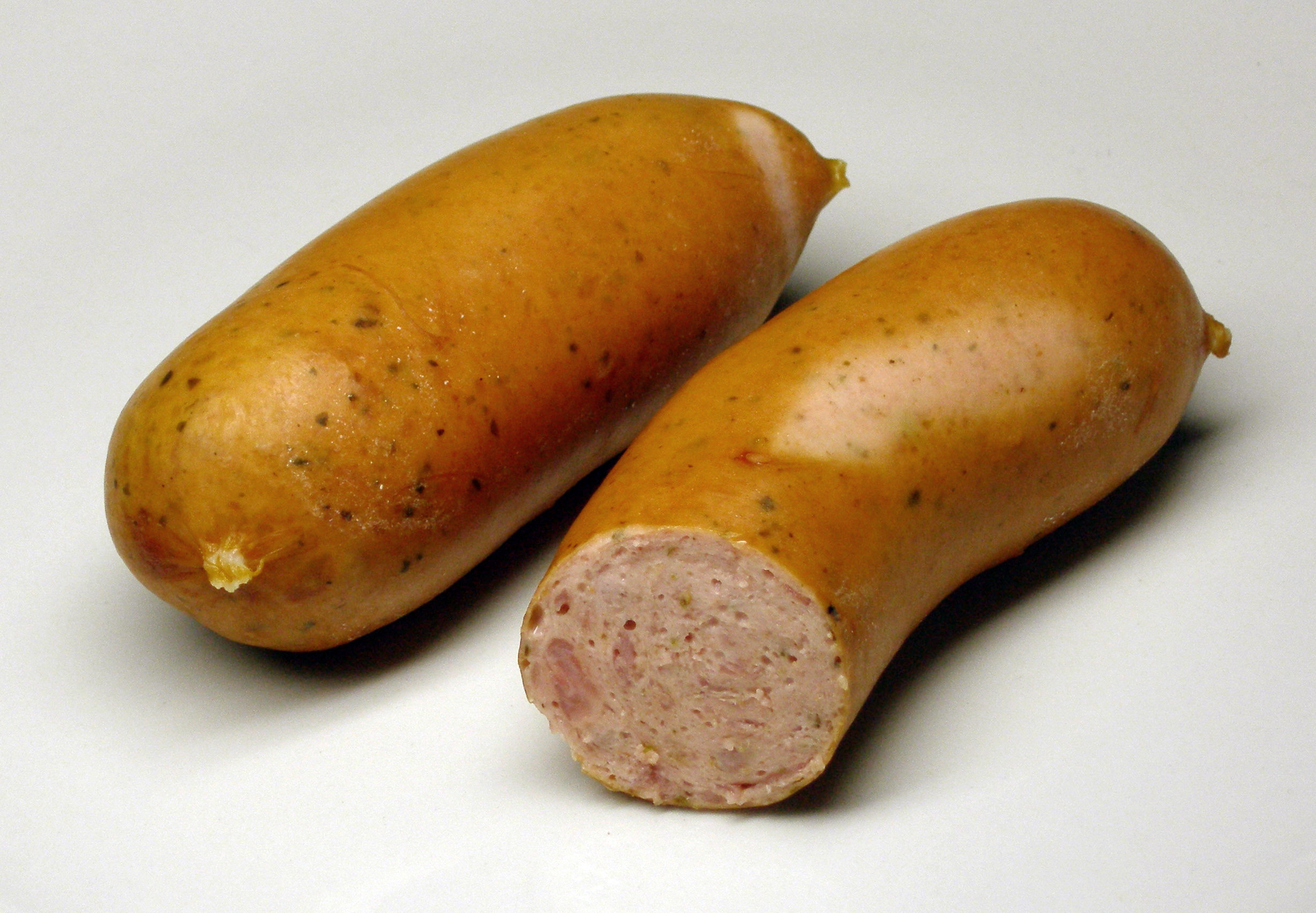
Regensburger Wurst

Regensburger Wurst is a boiled sausage with a fine or coarse pork filling. It comes in a compact shape with a length of about 10 cm (4 in) and a diameter of about 4 cm. It was invented in Regensburg, Germany in the second half of the 19th century and only sausages that are produced in the inner city ring may be called "Regensburger". The local name for the sausages is "Knacker", which can be translated as "cracker" or "crackler".

== Characteristics ==
The sausage is prepared using pork without fat which is finely ground and mixed with salt and spices as well as some dices of pork. The sausage filling is put into sausage casing made from beef intestines, bound into short sausages, smoked and then boiled.

The Regensburger Würste can be eaten either hot or cold and are also the main ingredient for the Regensburger Wurstsalat that is made with a marinade of oil, vinegar, chopped onions and mustard.

Another popular serving is the Regensburger Semmel which features the sausage broiled and halved in a bread roll together with sweet mustard, horseradish and pickled gherkin and is eaten as a snack.
