= Extrawurst =

German cold cut sausage

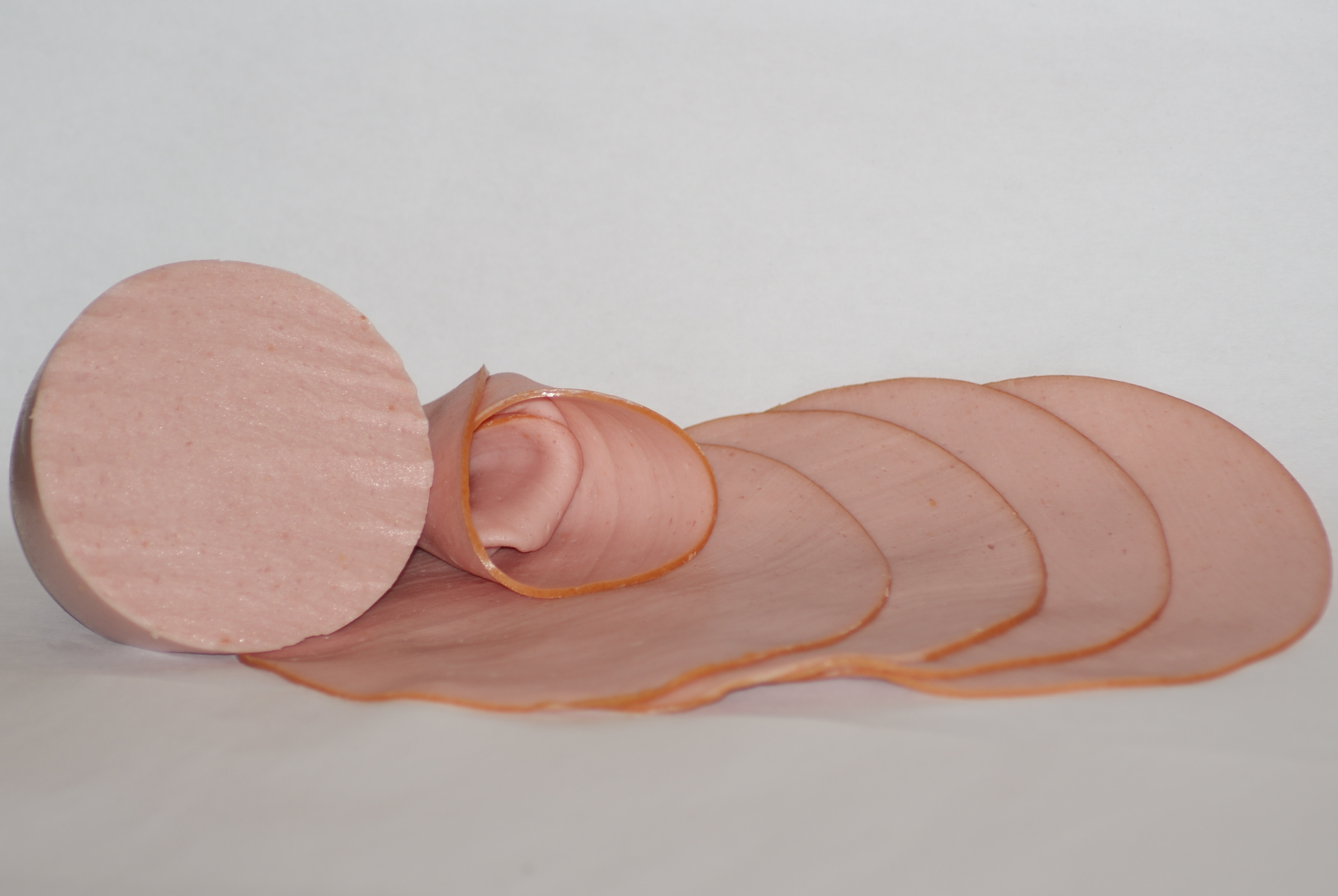
Smoked Extrawurst

Extrawurst (German: [ˈɛkstʁaˌvʊʁst]) can be either a type of cold cut or part of a German idiomatic expression.

== Sausage type ==
Extrawurst is a type of Austrian cold cut made from a well-spiced mixture of beef, pork and bacon fat. In Austria, it is the most popular type of cold cut.

It is similar to the American Bologna sausage, the Dutch Boterhamworst, the German Lyoner or Fleischwurst and the Swedish Falukorv.

It is cooked or served cold, often in a Wurstsalat, or as a cold cut.

One variety is the Pikantwurst, which has finely chopped red or green peppers added to it. Another type of Extrawurst called Gurkerlextra containing small chunks of pickled cucumber is also available.

== German idiomatic expression ==
Extrawurst is also a frequently used German expression of disapproval relating to someone wanting or receiving special treatment. One would say "er will immer eine Extrawurst gebraten haben" or "er bekommt eine Extrawurst gebraten" ("he always wants [or "he gets"] an additional/special sausage grilled/fried for him") to express the aforementioned.
