= Saure Zipfel =

German sausage dish

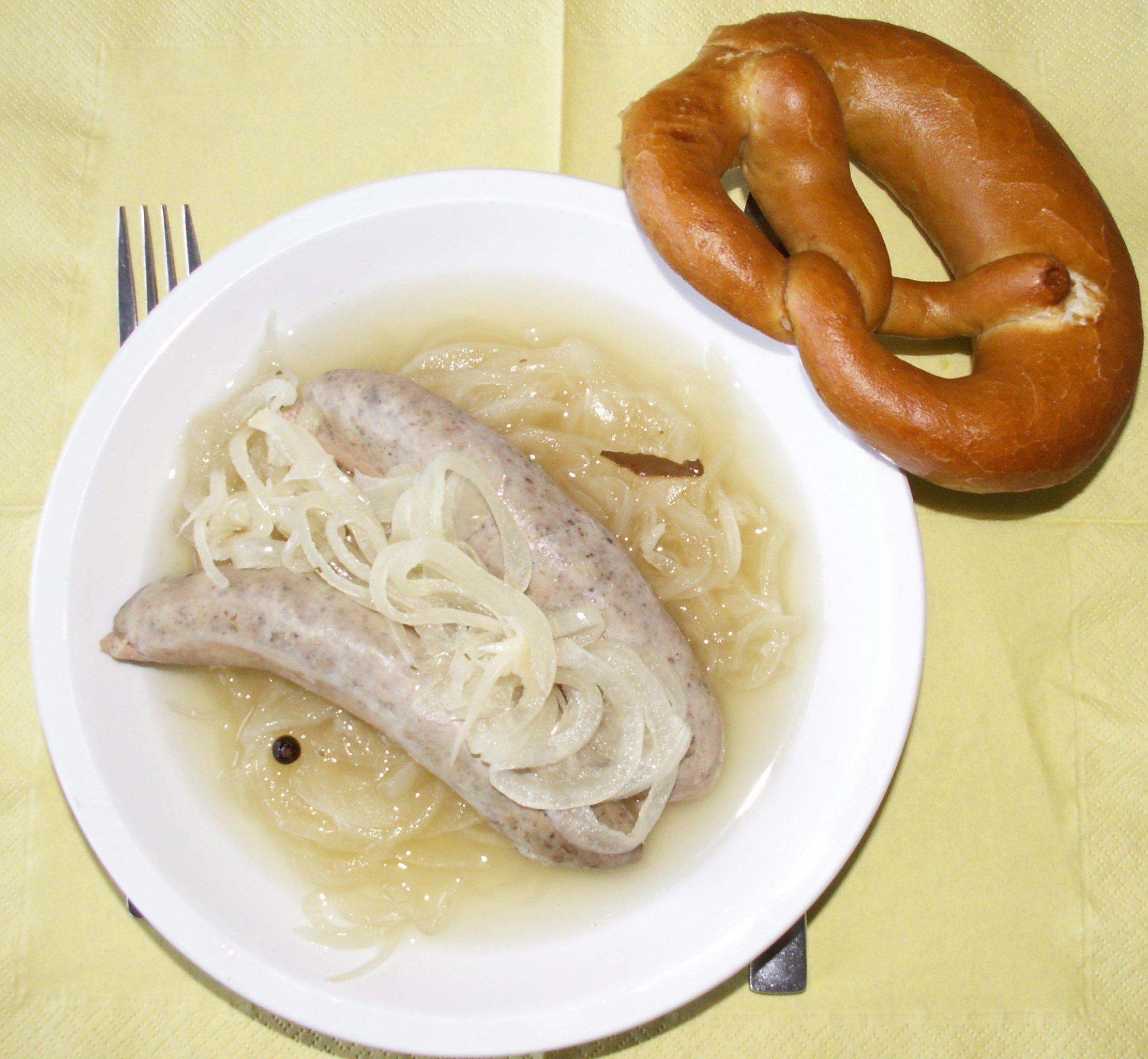
Blaue Zipfel served in brew with a pretzel

Saure Zipfel (lit.: sour ends) or Blaue Zipfel (lit.: blue ends) is a typical dish of the cuisine of Franconia and Upper Palatinate. It consists of Bratwurst cooked in vinegar.

To prepare the dish, onions, vinegar, white wine and spices (bay leaves, pepper, clove and juniper berries) are cooked together. Then the raw Bratwürste are added and are simmered on low heat. During this process, they become a pale blue that gives the dish its name. They are served in the brew with bread, bread rolls or pretzels.
