= Gaisburger Marsch =

Traditional Swabian beef stew

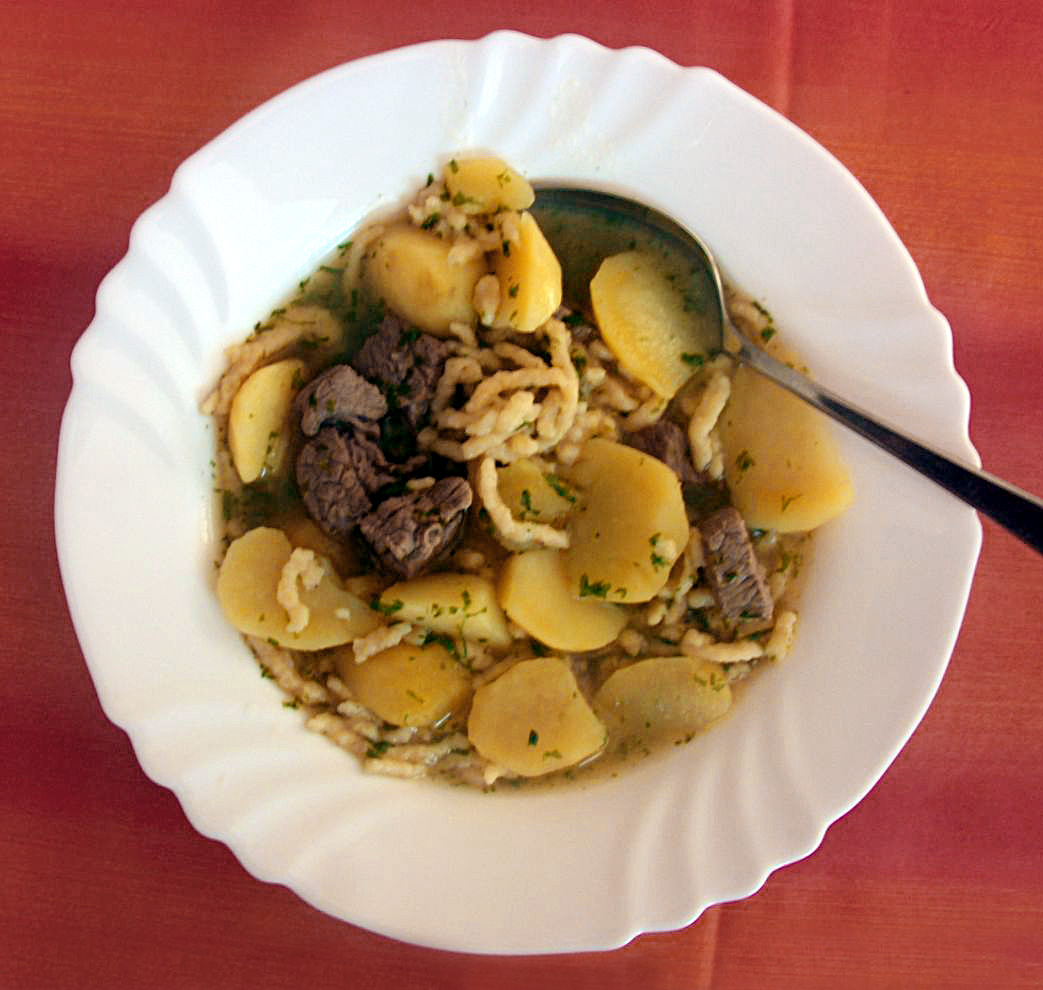
- Type: Stew
- Place of origin: Germany
- Region or state: Swabia
- Main ingredients: Meat, beef broth, potatoes, Spätzle

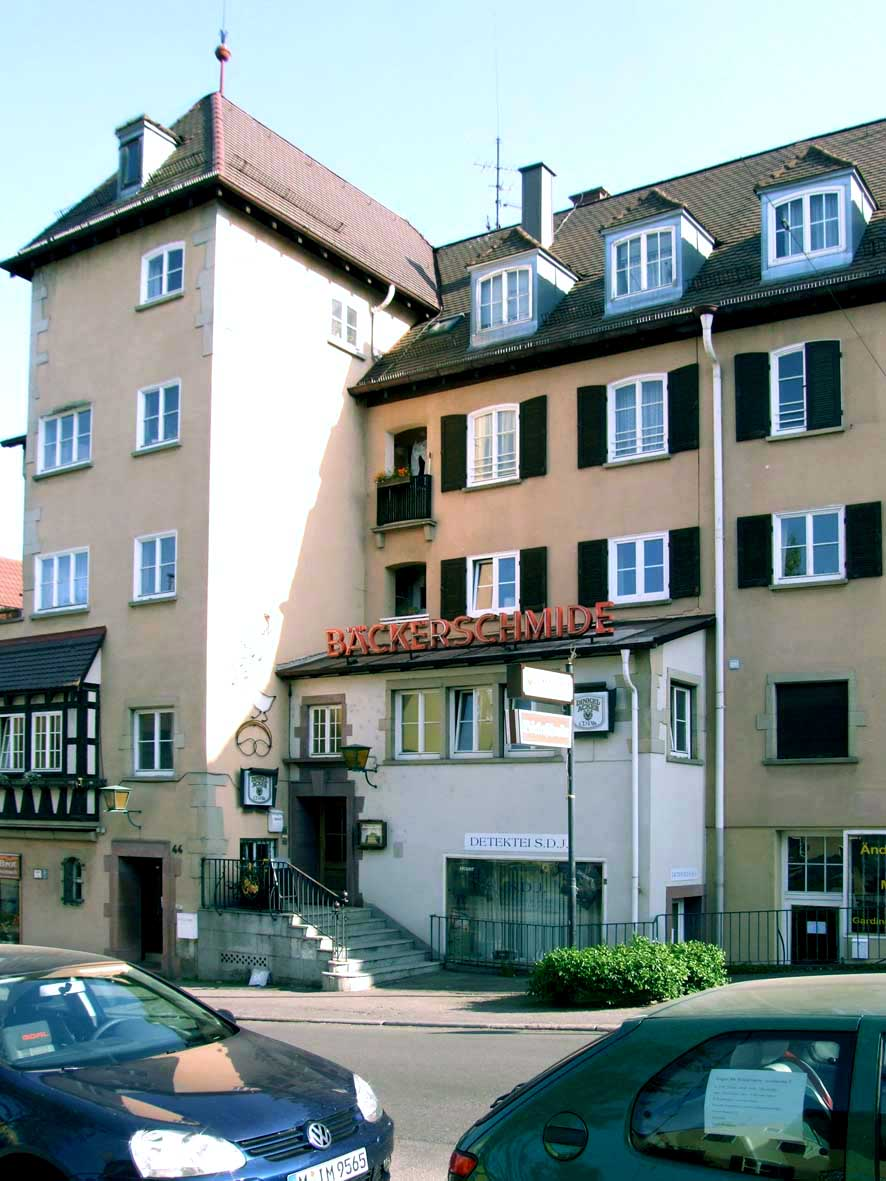
Bäckerschmide

Gaisburger Marsch (German pronunciation: [ˈɡaɪsbʊʁɡɐ ˈmaʁʃ], "march of Gaisburg") is a traditional Swabian beef stew named after Gaisburg, a district of Stuttgart.

The meat, cooked in a strong beef broth, is cut into cubes and served with cooked potatoes and Spätzle. The broth is poured over the dish before topping it with golden-brown onions fried in butter.

One explanation for the name Gaisburger Marsch is that the dish was so popular in the 19th century among officer candidates that they marched all the way to Gaisburg, where their favorite dish was served in the restaurant called Bäckerschmide. Another version claims that locals from Gaisburg became prisoners of war, and their women were only allowed to bring them one meal every day, so they created this nourishing dish and marched with it to the camp. The district of Gaisburg (today part of Stuttgart Ost) hosts annual celebrations with a festival lasting several days.

Gaisburger Marsch is the favourite food of former Bundespräsident Horst Köhler, Wolfgang Schneiderhan, and Chef Harald Wohlfahrt.

== See also ==
- List of stews
