= Pointed cabbage =

Cabbage cultivar

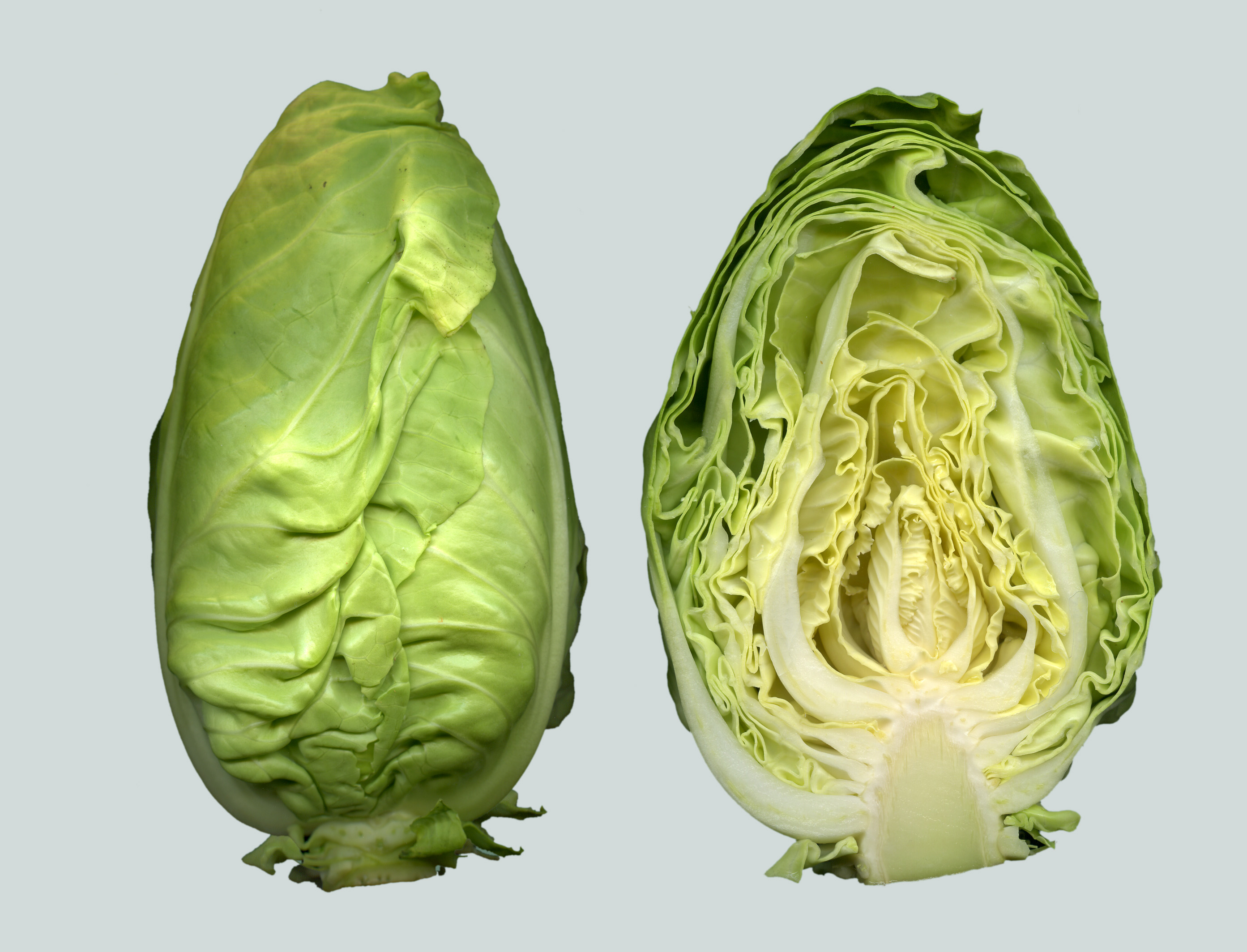
Pointed cabbage

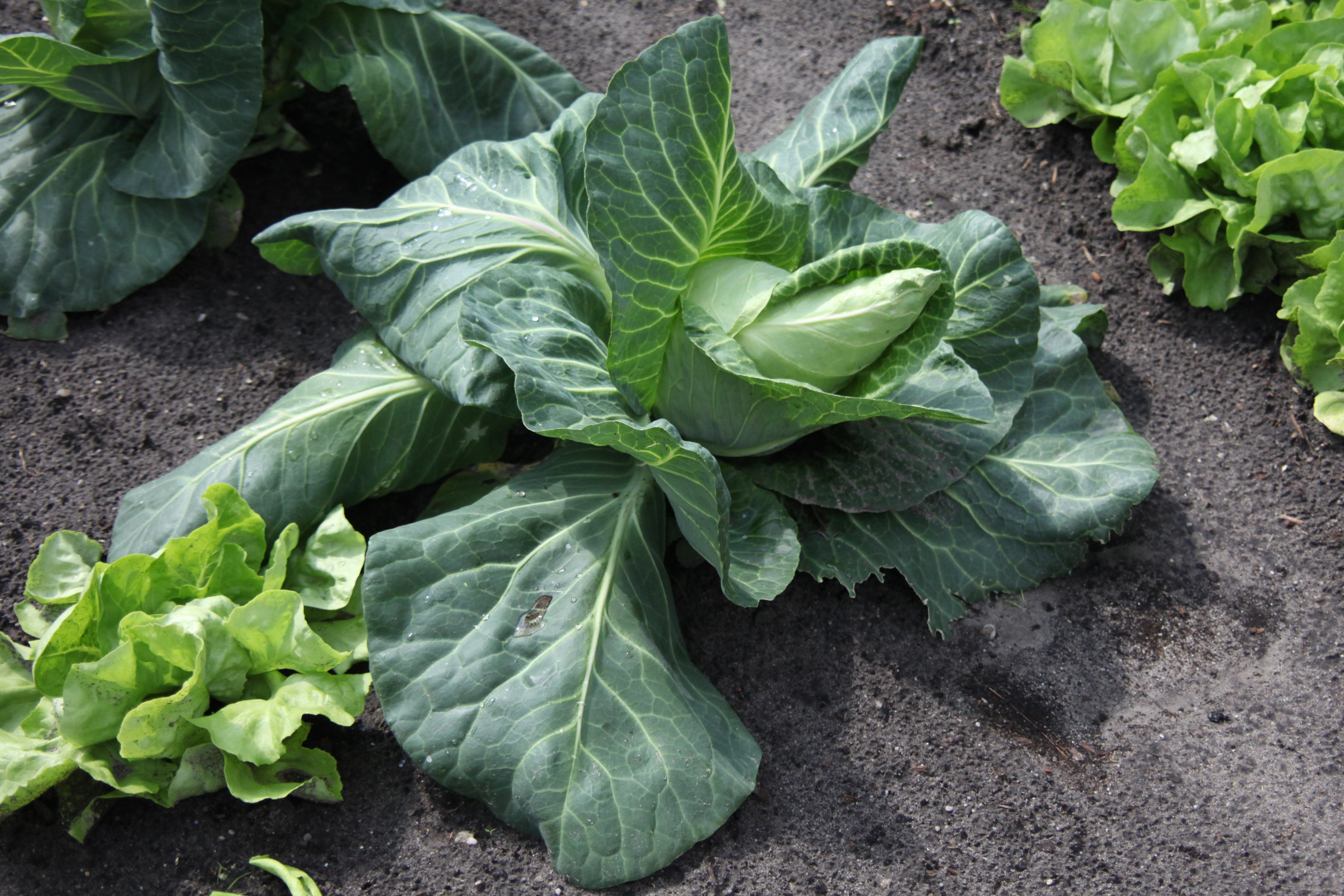
Pointed cabbage in the field

Pointed cabbage (Brassica oleracea var. capitata f. acuta), also known as cone, sweetheart, hispi or sugarloaf cabbage is a form of cabbage (Brassica oleracea) with a tapering shape and large delicate leaves varying in colour from yellowish to blue-green. It tastes less pronounced and more delicate than common white cabbage (Brassica oleracea var. capitata f. alba). It is the earliest cabbage, grown for sale in the UK from May to November but it is grown in Spain from November to April.

In Northern Bohemia, red pointed cabbage is used to make Kysané zelí, fermenting being started just by adding salt and producing red sauerkraut.

Production of pointed cabbage is on the decrease because white cabbage produces higher yields and is easier to process owing to its round shape.

Pointed cabbage can be used like Savoy cabbage or white cabbage but needs less cooking because of its more delicate leaves. It can also be eaten raw and is suitable for salads.

== Filderkraut ==
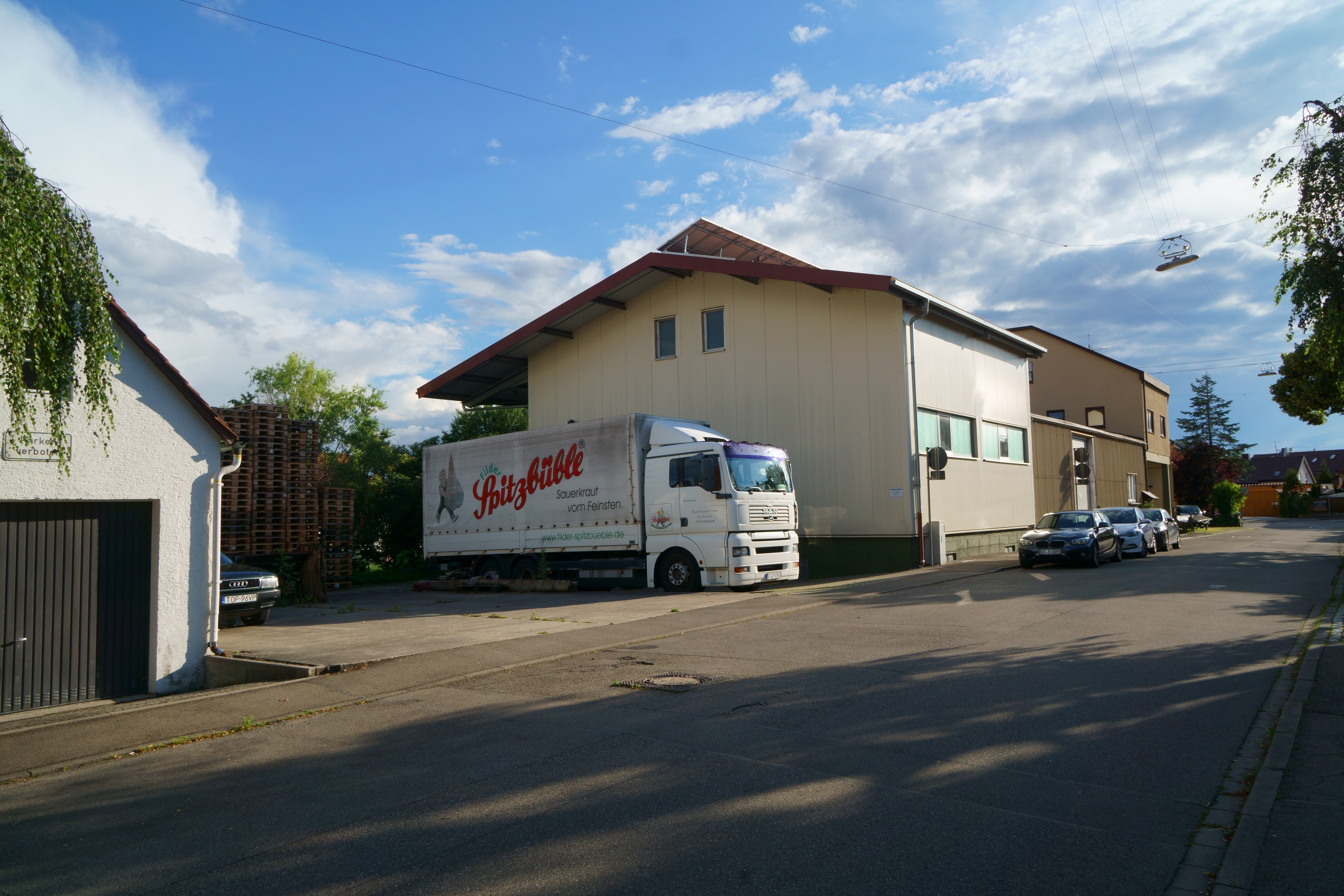
A Filderkraut company in Filderstadt-Bernhausen

Filderkraut is a variety of pointed cabbage grown in the Filder, a fertile plain with loess soils south of Stuttgart. It has large, compact heads consisting of fine leaves and is mainly used for making sauerkraut. Since 24 Oktober 2012 Filderkraut / Filderspitzkraut has been registered in the EU as a protected designation of origin. Many companies in the Filder cultivate their own varieties and produce their own seeds. In order to develop seeds the tip of the head must be cut off and a cross-shaped incision made in order for the flowers to develop.

Sauerkraut made from pointed cabbage is produced for sale by only a few companies. Filderkraut plays a large role in local culture and cuisine and is served at the Cannstatter Volksfest.

The Filder pointed cabbage Brassica oleracea var. capitata fo. alba subfo. conica has been included in the Ark of Taste by the Slow Food movement.
