= Wurstsalat =

German sausage salad

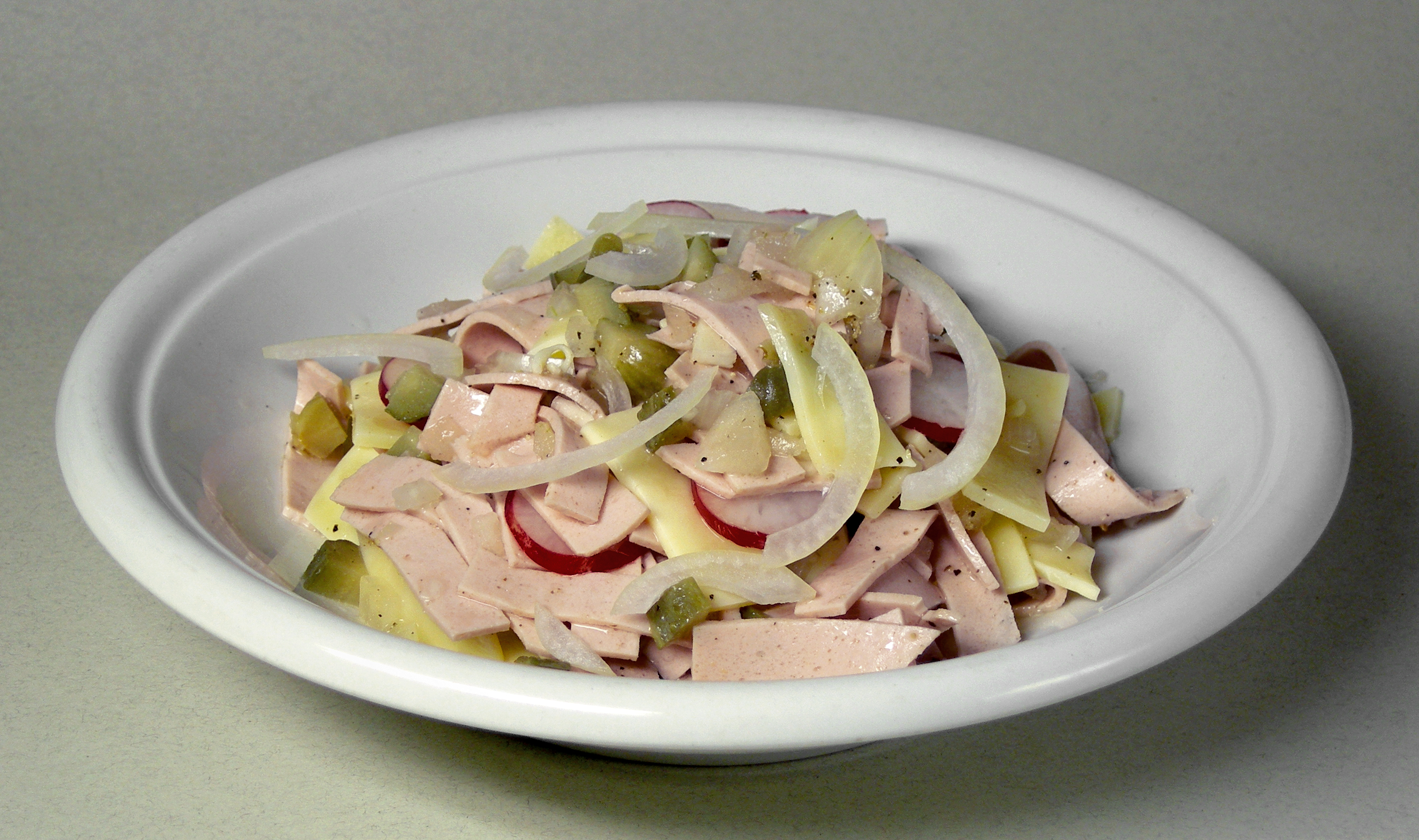
- Type: Salad
- Main ingredients: Sausage (Lyoner, stadtwurst, Regensburger Wurst or extrawurst), distilled white vinegar, oil, onions

Wurstsalat (German: [ˈvʊʁstzaˌlaːt], literally sausage salad) is a tart sausage salad prepared with distilled white vinegar, oil and onions. A variation of the recipe adds strips of pickled gherkin. It is generally made from boiled sausage like Lyoner, stadtwurst, Regensburger Wurst or extrawurst. It is a traditional snack in Southern Germany, Alsace, Switzerland and Austria (where it is known as Saure Wurst, lit. "sour sausage"). In the Czech Republic, similar snack is served in full, not cut to slices, and is known as “the drowning man”, “utopenec” in Czech.

To prepare the dish, the sausage is cut into thin slices or strips and placed, along with raw onion (sliced into rings or diced), in a vinegar and oil marinade, lightly seasoned with salt, pepper, and sometimes paprika. Common additional ingredients are finely cut gherkins, radishes, parsley or chives. Wurstsalat is generally served with bread and sometimes fried potatoes.

Popular variants are the Schwäbischer Wurstsalat (Swabian wurstsalat), which uses one half blood sausage, and Schweizer Wurstsalat (Swiss wurstsalat), which like the Straßburger Wurstsalat (Strasbourg wurstsalat) or Elsässer Wurstsalat (Alsacian wurstsalat) also contains Emmental cheese and uses the traditional Swiss cervelat instead of Lyoner sausage.

== See also ==
- de:Fleischsalat is a similar meat salad, but is usually prepared with a mayonnaise dressing.
- List of sausage dishes
