= Stadtwurst =

German sausage

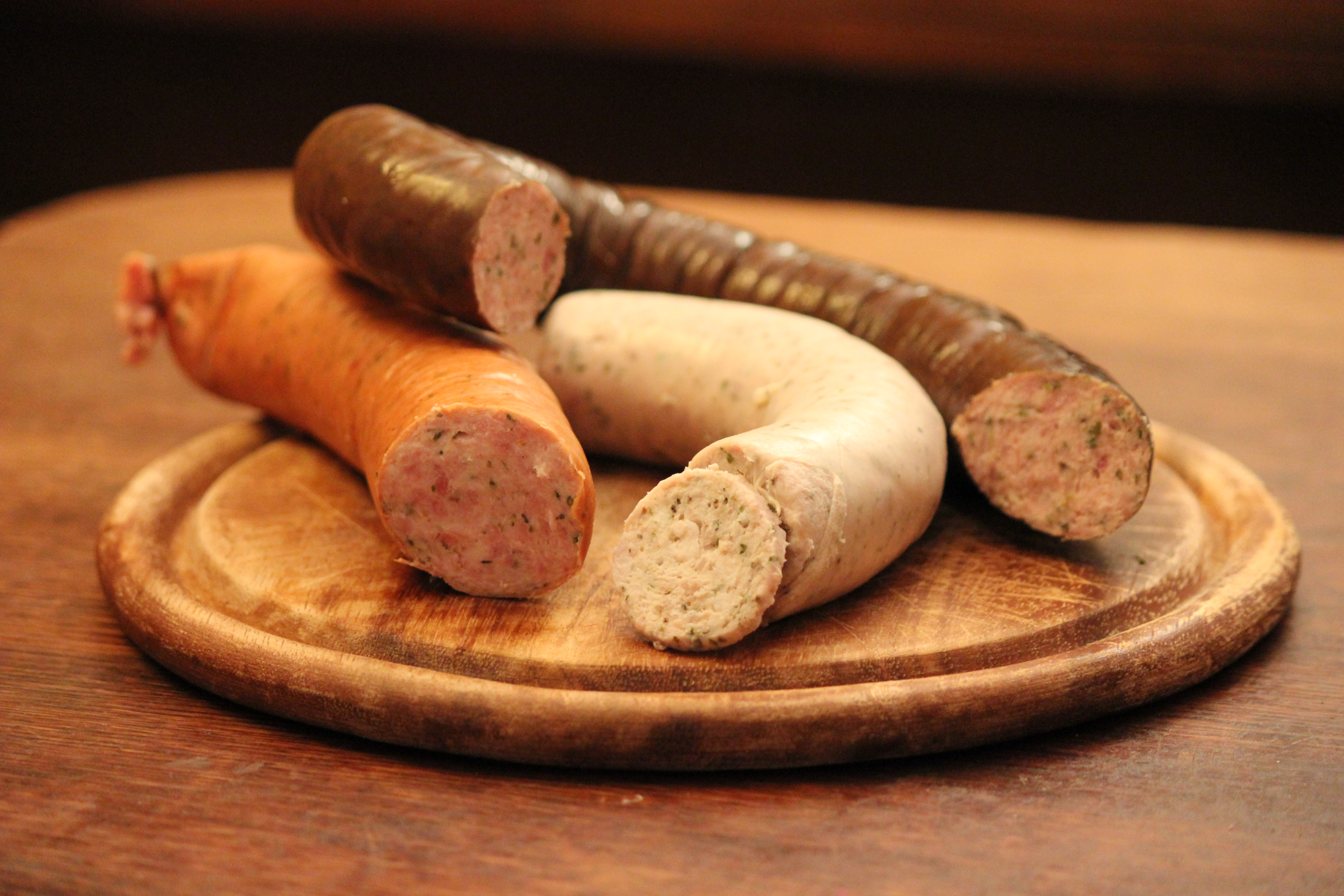
Heidecker Stadtwurst: red, white and black

Stadtwurst (town sausage) is a type of sausage consisting of pork in a casing that may be white or red. Stadtwurst is a regional variety in Franconia and Upper Palatinate (Oberpfalz) and usually unknown and not available in other parts of Germany.

The sausage is often served as "Stadtwurst mit Musik", the sausage with raw onions and other accompaniments.
