= Frankfurter Würstchen =

Sausage specialty from Frankfurt, Hesse

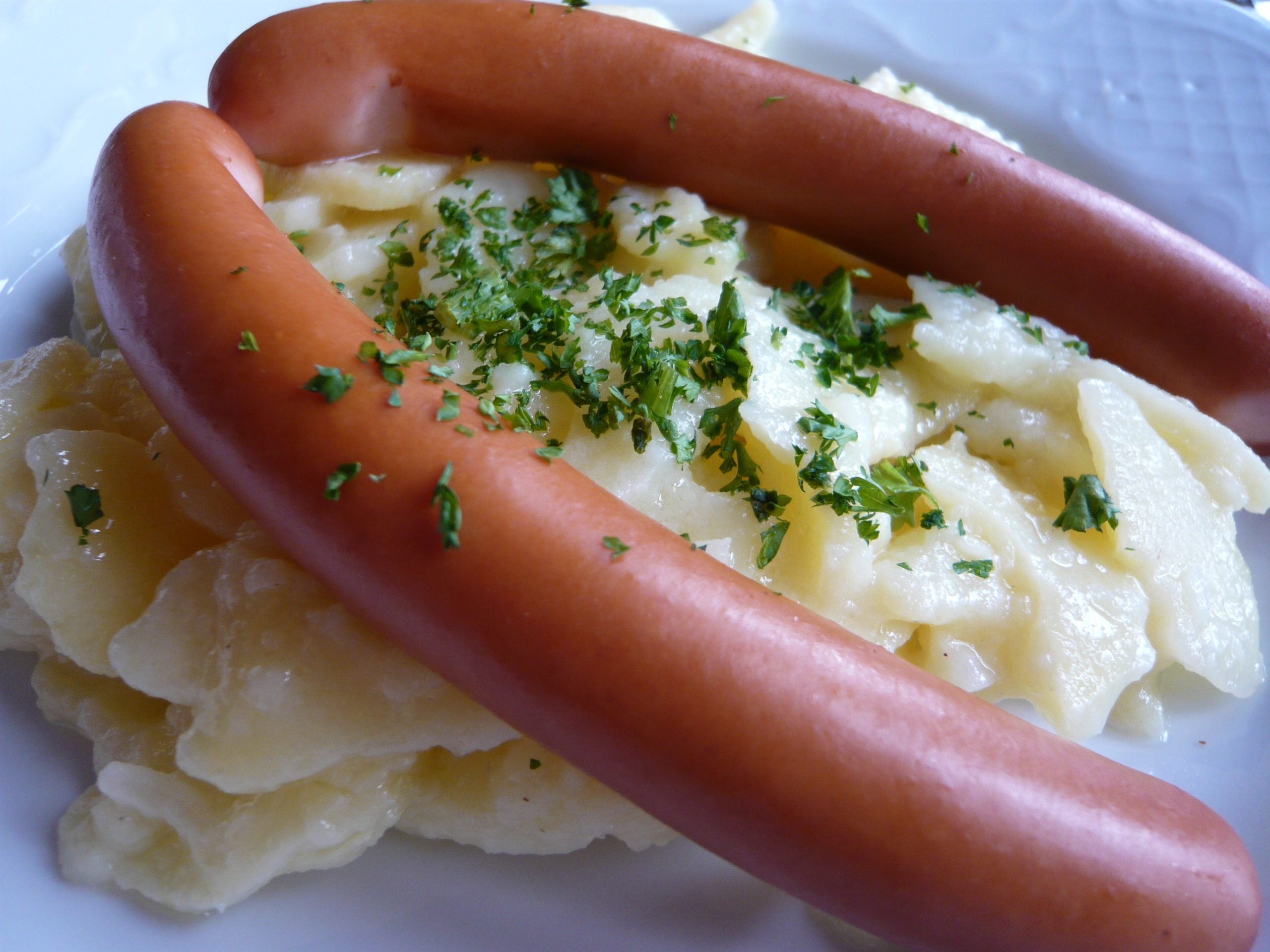
Original Frankfurter Würstchen traditionally served with potato salad

Cooking Frankfurters for too long results in the casing breaking open.

Frankfurter Würstchen ('Frankfurt sausage') is a thin parboiled sausage in a casing of sheep's intestine. The flavour is acquired by low temperature smoking. For consumption, Frankfurters are occasionally heated in hot water for only about eight minutes to prevent the skin from bursting. If they are grilled, Frankfurt sausages are heated over propane or charcoal flame. They are traditionally served with bread, mustard, horseradish or potato salad.

== History ==
Meat sausages as a Frankfurt speciality are already mentioned in medieval sources, often served during the Imperial coronation ceremonies at the Römerberg. Smoked Frankfurter Würstchen have had protected geographical status in Germany since about 1860. Since 1929, the indication is only allowed to be used for sausages that are produced in the Frankfurt area, mainly in Neu-Isenburg and Dreieich.

Originally, Frankfurters were made without nitrite curing salt. After going through specific aging and smoking processes, the sausages, now of a golden colour, are put into wooden boxes with small sheets of parchment paper between layers. Therefore, the traditional sausages have a square cross-section, but there are a few exceptions where the sausage is round.

== Other countries ==
Outside Germany, "frankfurter" is a common designation for boiled sausages, such as North American hot dog sausages, which are called Wiener Würstchen ('Vienna sausages') in Germany. The majority of hot dogs no longer use the sheep intestine and are skinless; however, some people still make traditional hot dogs.

In 1984, Frankfurt celebrated the 500th birthday of the hot dog with people living in the city claiming that "the frankfurter" was first produced in Frankfurt, Germany. It is furthermore accepted that a German immigrant introduced the frankfurter sausage to New York from his native Frankfurt.

In Austria, Vienna sausages are called Frankfurter Würstl as they allegedly were brought to Vienna by Johann Georg Lahner (1772–1845), a butcher trained in Frankfurt, who in 1805 began to produce sausages from a mixture of pork and beef.

== See also ==
- Frankfurter Rindswurst
