= Carniolan sausage =

Slovenian sausage

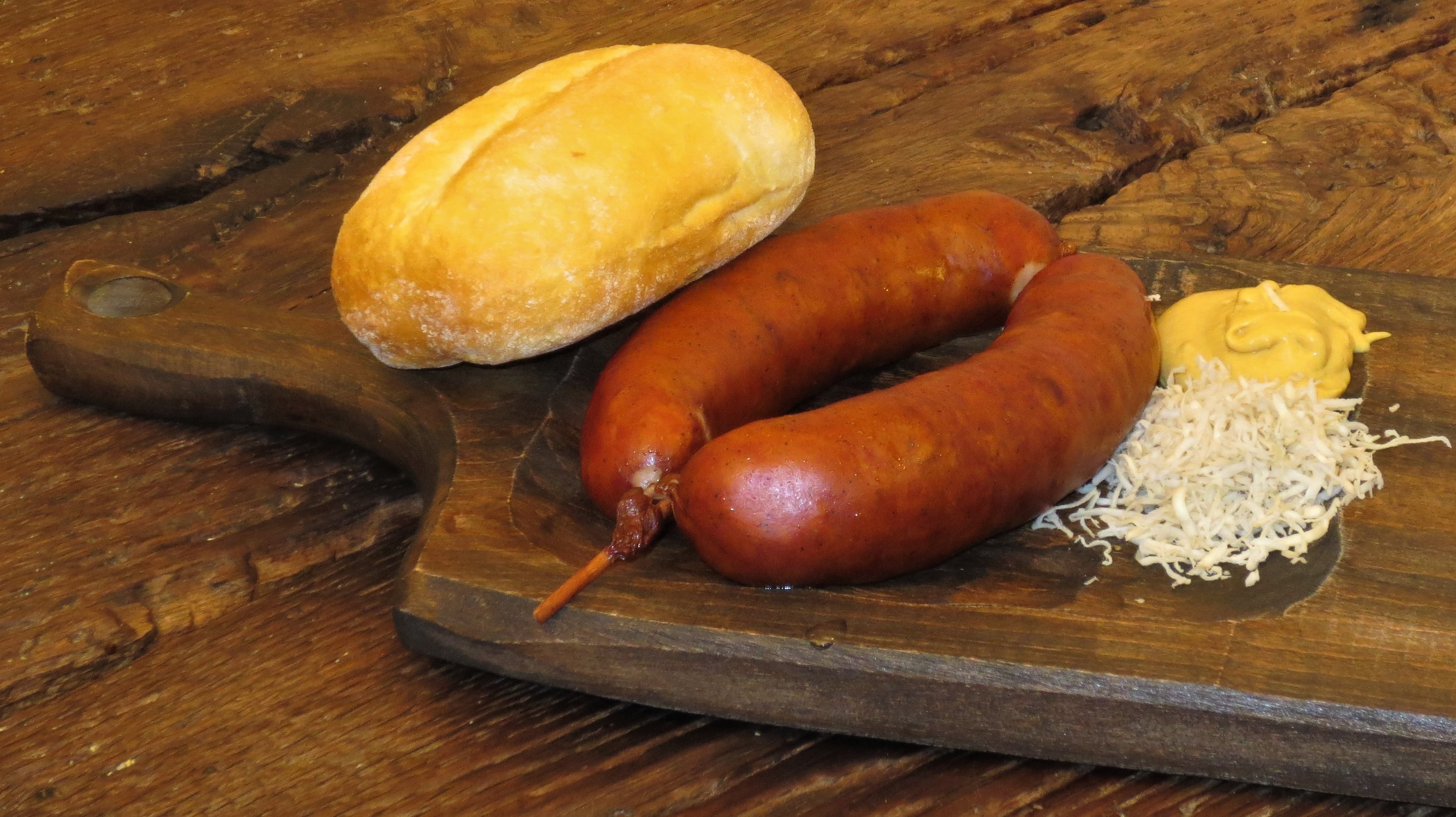
- Carniolian sausage served with a bun, mustard and horseradish, Ljubljana, Slovenia
- Course: Sausage
- Place of origin: Slovenia
- Region or state: Territory of the former Carniola
- Main ingredients: Pork; Garlic
- Variations: Käsekrainer

The Carniolan sausage (Slovene: kranjska klobasa, Serbo-Croatian: kranjska kobasica, Australian English: kransky, German: Krainer Wurst, Italian dialect of Trieste: luganighe de Cragno) is a Slovenian parboiled sausage similar to what is known as kielbasa or Polish sausage in North America.

The noun klobasa refers to a small sausage generally served whole (in contrast to salama) in Slovene. The adjective kranjska derives from the region of Carniola (Kranjska in Slovene, Krain in German), which used to be a duchy of the Austrian Empire. The earliest mention of the Carniolan sausage in German is found in Katharina Prato's renowned cookbook Süddeutsche Küche (South German Cooking, 1896, first edition 1858). The Slovene term kranjska klobasa was first mentioned in the sixth edition of Slovenska kuharica (Slovene Cookbook) by Felicita Kalinšek in 1912.

The Carniolan sausage contains at least 75 to 80% pork (aside from bacon) and at most 20% bacon. It may contain as much as 5% water, sea salt from the Sečovlje saltworks, a little garlic, saltpetre and black pepper. No other ingredients are permitted. The meat must be cut in small pieces 10 to 13 mm and bacon 8 to 10 mm. The filling is stuffed into pork intestine with a diameter of 32 to 36 mm. They are formed in pairs of 12 to 16 cm (4.7 to 6.3 in) lengths and a weight of 180 to 220 grams. Pairs are linked together with a wooden skewer. The sausages are hot smoked and heat-cured at about 70 °C (158 °F).

== Variations and preparation ==
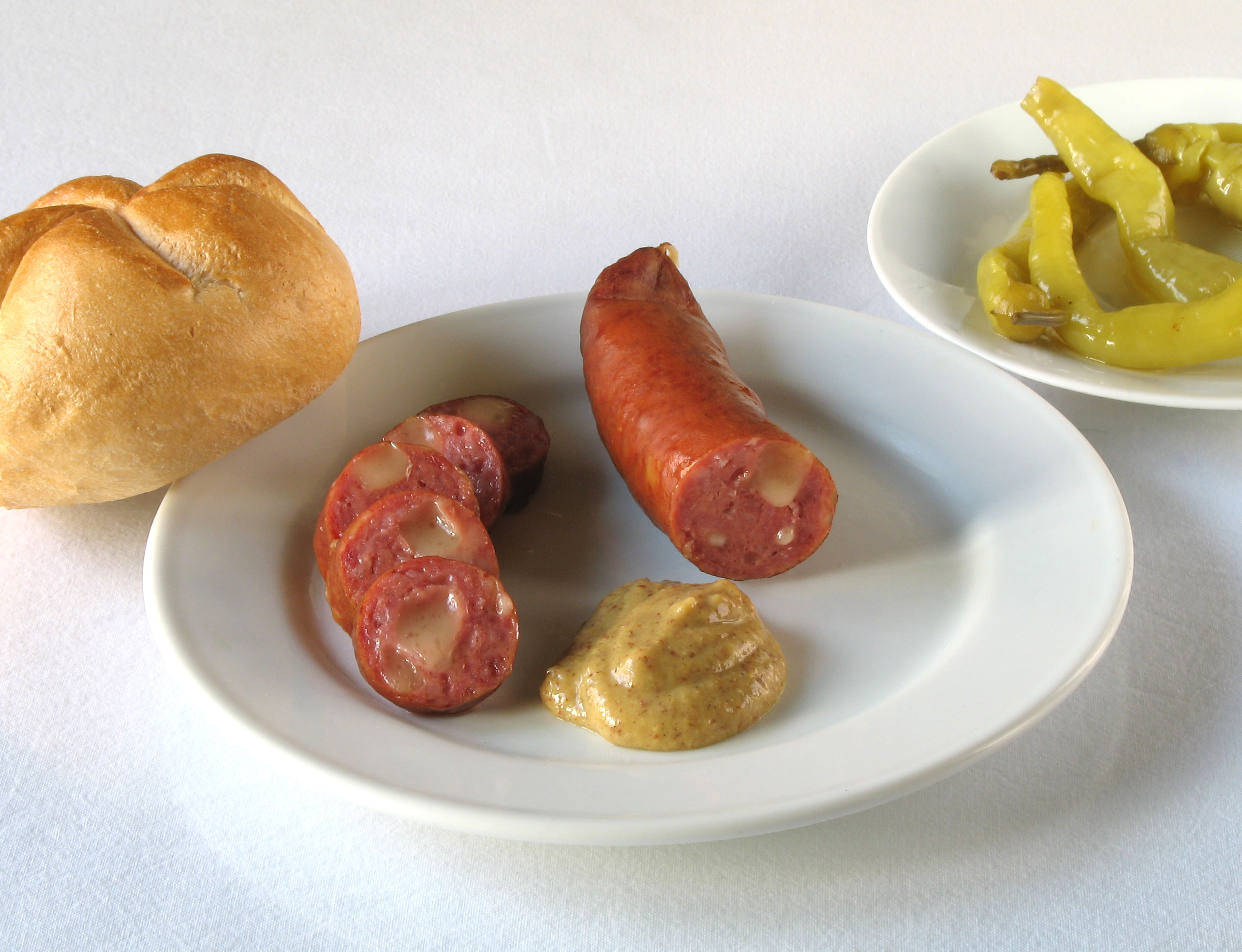
Käsekrainer made in Austria

The Käsekrainer is a variation of this sausage made with small chunks of cheese – it contains 10% to 20% cheese (e.g., Emmentaler) cut into small cubes. Käsekrainer were first made in Austria in the early 1980s. As of 2019 they are a standard offering at sausage stands (Würstelstände). Käsekrainer can be boiled, baked or grilled. It is essential to keep them on low to medium heat; otherwise the outside may get burned and the inside remains cold. Care should be taken when preparing them, because the cheese can become quite hot; the sausages should not be cut or poked while cooking, otherwise the melting cheese would be released.

The sausage can be served with mustard, ketchup and a piece of dark bread; or – in the most common form in Austria – as a Käsekrainer-Hot-Dog. (By Hot Dog Austrians mean the bun, not the sausage.) The bread used is somewhat similar to a French baguette, but shorter (200 to 250 mm (7.9–9.8 in) long) and has a different texture and recipe, hence not called a baguette but a bun. The bun is cut open at one end and a hole is poked into it with a warm 1-inch-diameter (25 mm) metal rod. The next step is to put sauce in the hole. Austrians usually select from the following three sauces: sharp mustard, sweet mustard and ketchup.

== The (cheese) kransky in Australia ==
In the late 1940s and the 1950s, post-war immigrants from Yugoslavia introduced kranjska klobasa into Australia, where it became known as kransky. Cheese kransky is very popular in Australia and in New Zealand.

Like the pie, the sausage roll, the fried dim sim and the Chiko roll, the cheese kransky (often with chilli and sometimes wrapped in pastry) is a takeaway staple.

== Protection regime ==
In January 2015, Slovenia successfully entered it into the register of protected geographical indications (PGIs), despite objections by Austria, Croatia and Germany.

- Protected geographical indication (PGI) in the European Union

== See also ==
- Slovenian cuisine
