= Bierwurst =

Smoked food

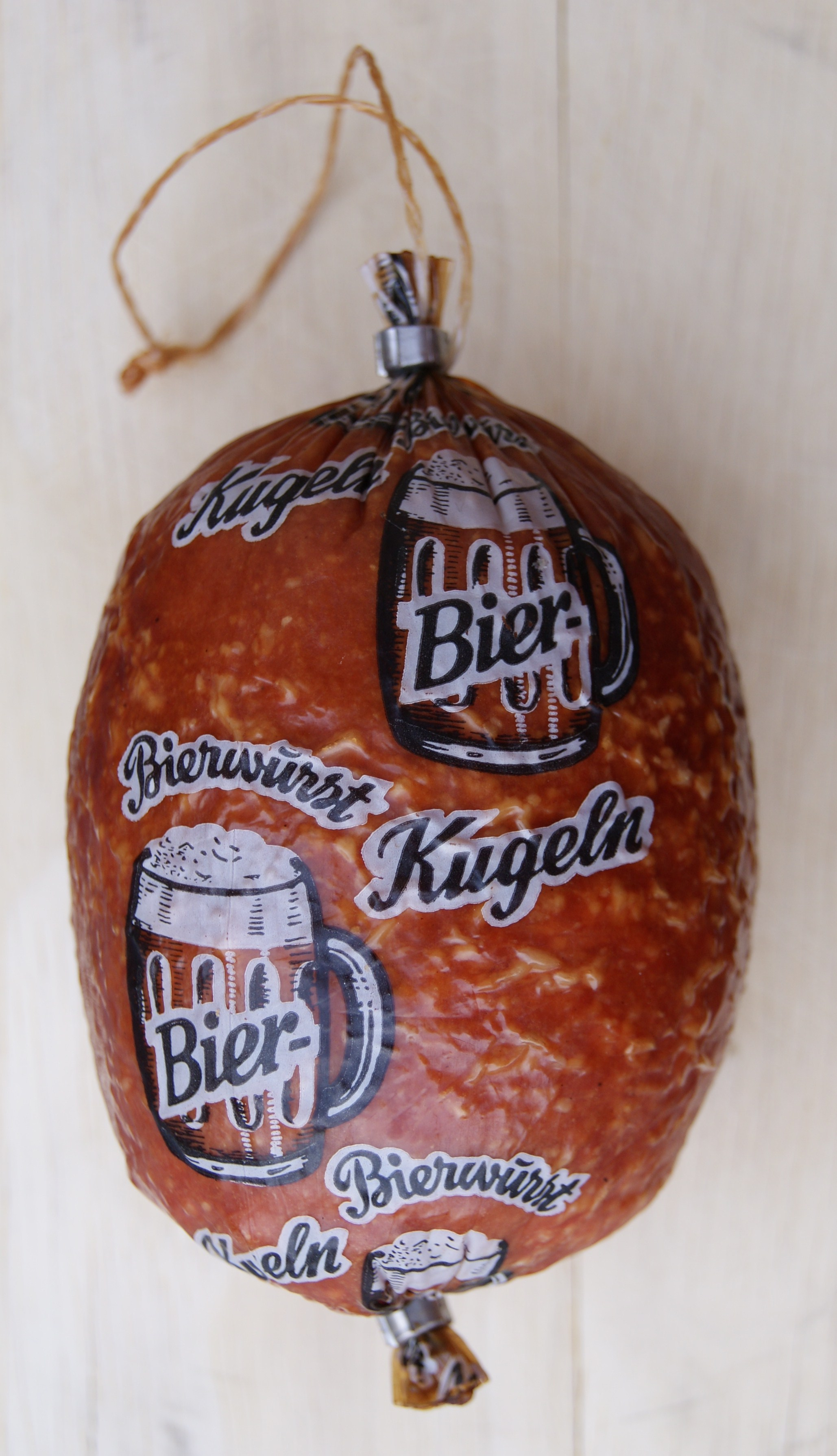
Bierwurst (Bierwurstkugel)

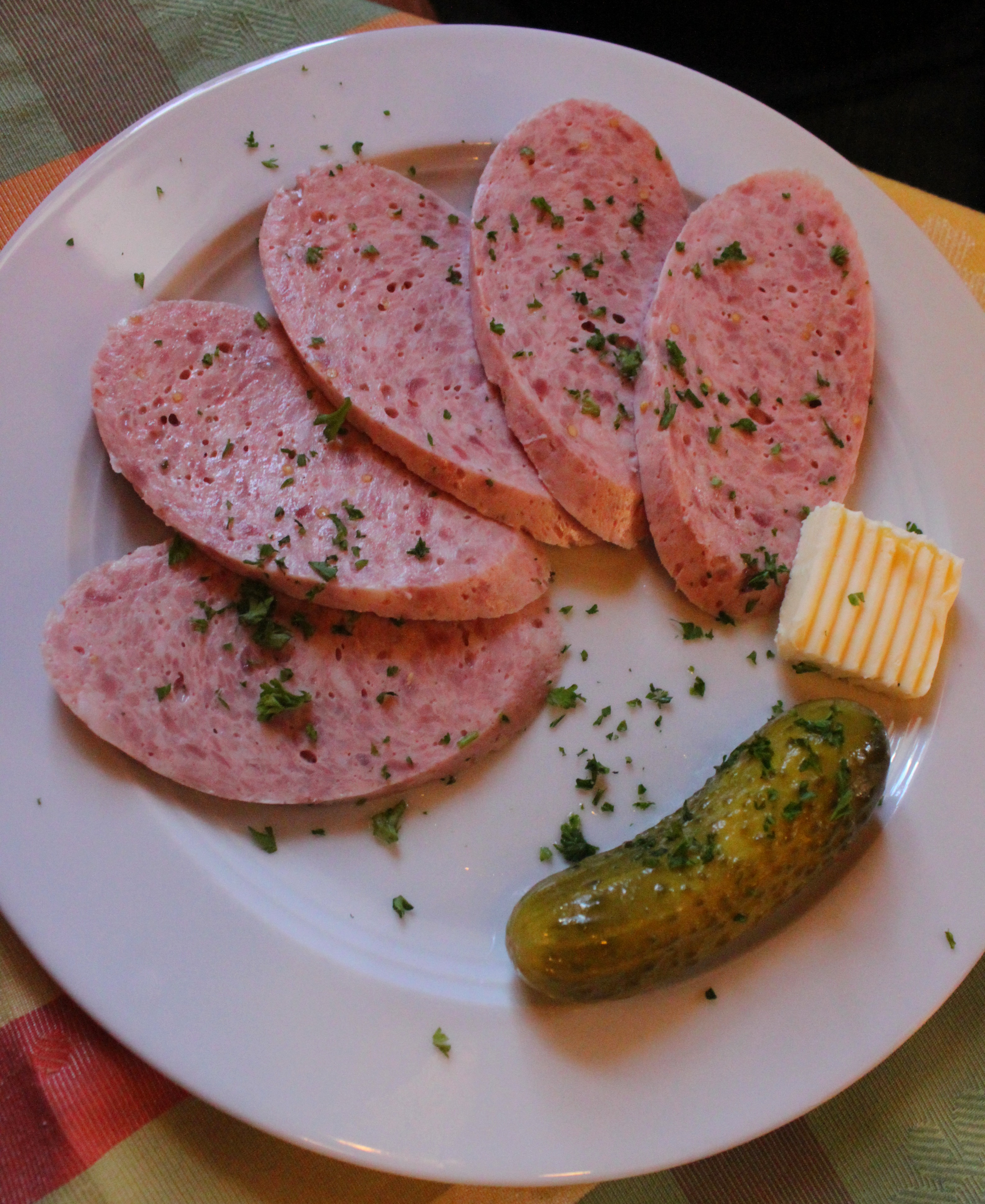
Bierwurst served in Göttingen

Bierwurst ( German pronunciation: [ˈbiːɐ̯ˌvʊʁst]; lit. 'beer sausage') is a German cooked, smoked Brühwurst sausage originally from Bavaria, with a garlicky flavor and dark red color. It is seasoned with black peppercorns, paprika and mustard seeds for flavor.

The meat is partially cured and then made into the sausage with the other ingredients, after which, the sausage is further cured, smoked and then blanched. In the past, the Bierwurst were stuffed into a pig's bladder, which gave them their typical spherical shape. Alternatively, large-diameter casings are also used for sausage production. Bierwurst is served in several regional variations in Germany.

It is usually sold as sandwich meat. Unsmoked, fresh Bierwurst will last for two days in the refrigerator. Pre-cooked Bierwurst will last for 5 to 7 days.

Contrary to its name, Bierwurst ("beer wurst", literally "beer sausage") does not contain any beer, but rather, is eaten cold as a snack with beer along with hearty slices of bread or rye bread and butter. Bierschinken is eaten in a similar way.

== See also ==
- List of sausages
- List of smoked foods
