= McEncroe =

McEncroe may refer to:

- Dermit McEncroe (fl. early 18th century), Irish doctor and poet
- Frank McEncroe (1908–1979), Australian publican, caterer, dairy farmer and food manufacturer
