= Waldviertler =

Type of sausage

A Waldviertler (also known as Waldviertler Rauchwurst or Rauchwürstel) is a type of sausage popular in Austria. It is a smoked scalded sausage that consists of a sausage mixture (referred to as Brät) and a portion of meat. It is available either in pairs joined at one end or portioned as sausages, encased in a thick casing. Typically served with mustard and horseradish, it is part of the standard offering of an Austrian Würstelstand (sausage stand).

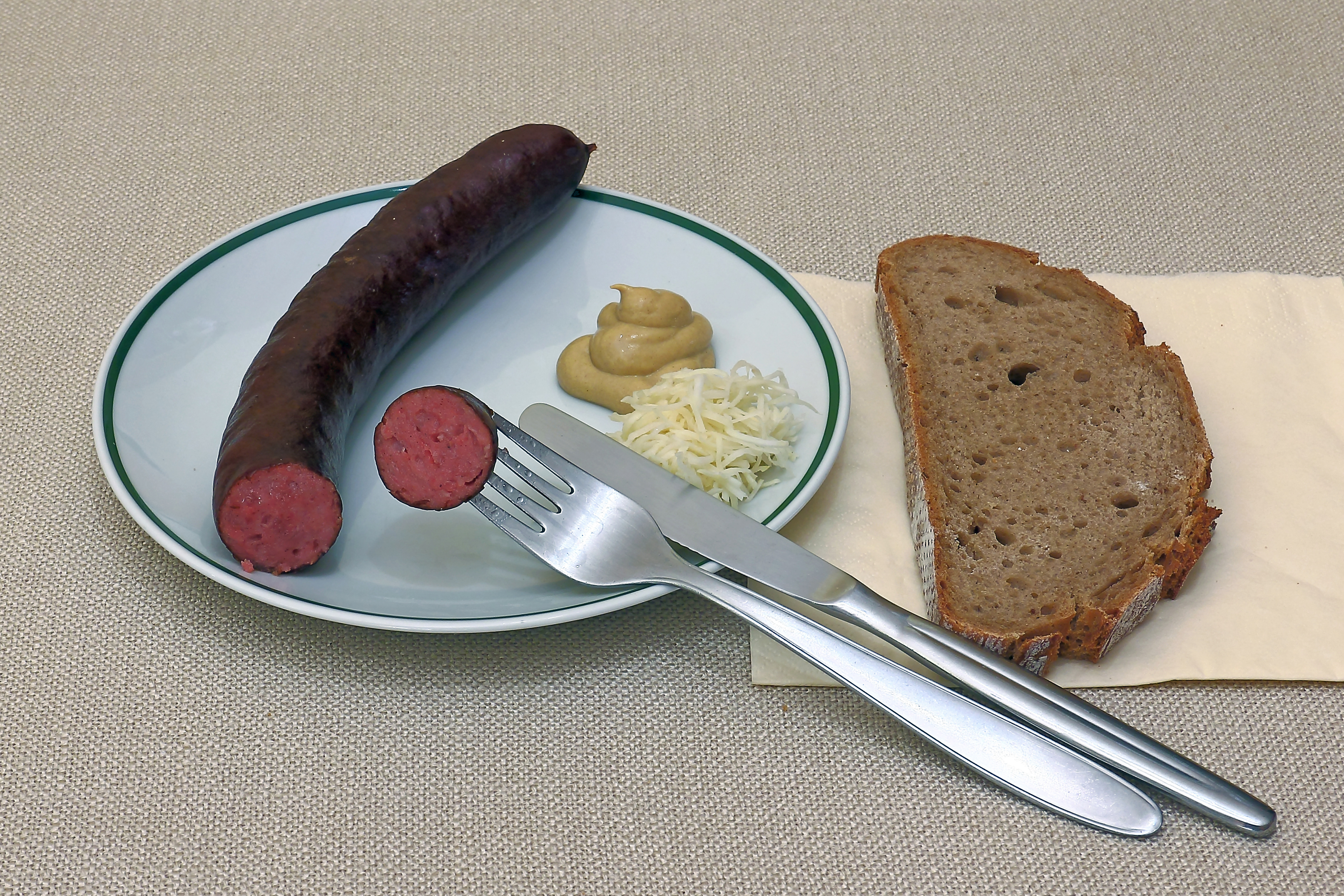
A Waldviertler served with bread, mustard and horseradish

The Waldviertler is named after the Austrian region Waldviertel. The region is known for its hearty cuisine, that is characterized by numerous types of smoked sausage and ham.
