= Annette Melton =

Australian actress and television presenter

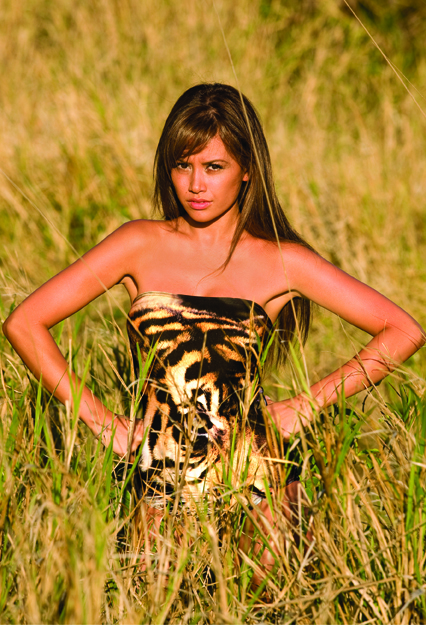
- Melton in 2008
- Born: Annette Melton; Sydney, Australia
- Occupations: actress, presenter
- Years active: 2006–present
- Website: annettemelton.com.au

Annette Melton is an Australian actress and television presenter. She has appeared in a US Discovery Channel series about female killers, Deadly Women; in a series six episode as Regina DeFrancisco and in a series eight episode as Gaile Owens. Melton has hosted televised motorsport productions such as the 2014 World Time Attack on Australia's free to air multicultural channel SBS and Motive TV on Foxtel. Her mixed-race beauty has seen her featured in FHM magazine, Maxim Magazine, on the cover of T3 and Acclaim magazines. In 2022 she was cast as Shannon in an Australian independent feature film, Get Free.

== Chiko Chick ==
Since the 1950s, Chiko Rolls had been advertised featuring the "Chiko Chick" character, a seductive woman on a motorbike accompanied by the slogan "Couldn't you go a Chiko Roll?".

In 2008, Simplot Australia, the makers of the Chiko Roll, began a nationwide search for the new "Chiko Chick", hoping to downplay the traditionally raunchy look in favour of a more wholesome "girl-next-door" image. In July 2008, the new advertising poster was unveiled at the Wagga Wagga Showgrounds, featuring Annette Melton as the new face of the product.

== Filmography ==
Year	Title	Role	Notes
2010	"Choose You"	Love interest	Stan Walker music video
2010	Motive TV	Herself; Co-host	Season 1
2011	Ninemsn	Herself; Host/reporter	"MotorVision TV" (various)
2012	"Take it Home"	Love interest	Johnny Ruffo music video
2013	Deadly Women	Regina DeFrancisco	"Bury the Boyfriend" (Season 6, Episode 18)
2014	World Time Attack	Herself; Co-host	Episode 1035
2014	Deadly Women	Gaile Owens	"To Have and to Kill" (Season 8, Episode 14)
2017	Epicentre TV	Herself; Host	"Sporting Event News" (various)
2022	Get Free	Shannon	Independent Feature Film
