= Buchkirchen =

- Municipality
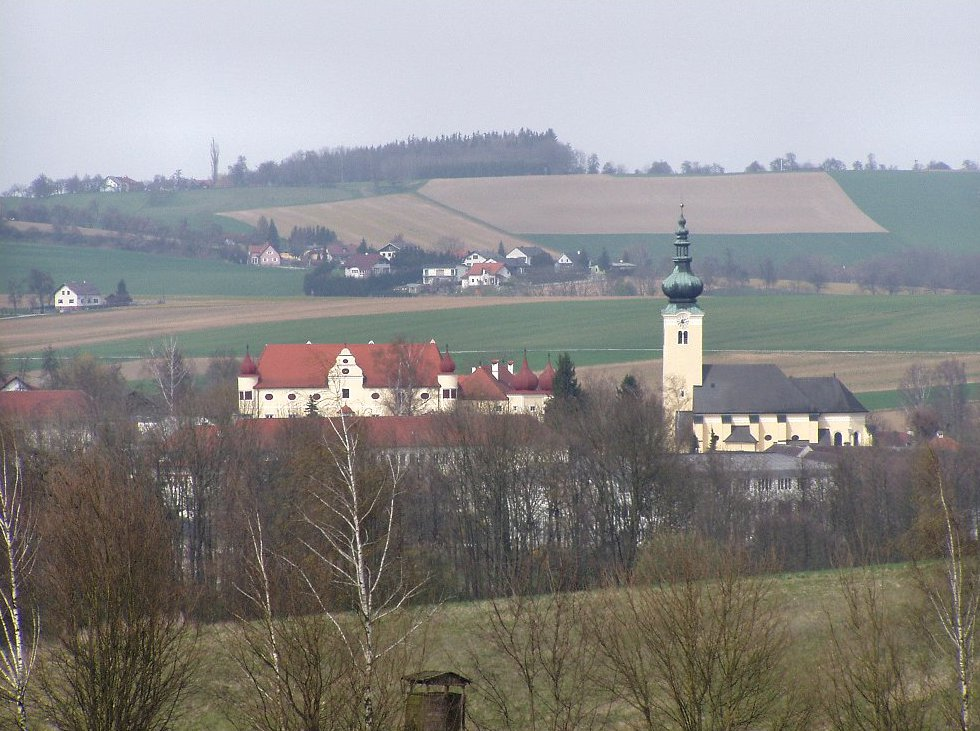

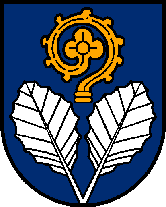
- Coat of arms

- Location within Austria
- Coordinates: 48°13′26″N 14°01′12″E
- Country: Austria
- State: Upper Austria
- District: Wels-Land

Government
  - Mayor: Nikon Baumgartner (SPÖ)

Area
  - Total: 32.17 km^{2} (12.42 sq mi)
- Elevation: 346 m (1,135 ft)

Population (2018-01-01)
  - Total: 4,038
  - Density: 125.5/km^{2} (325.1/sq mi)
- Time zone: UTC+1 (CET)
  - Summer (DST): UTC+2 (CEST)
- Postal code: 4611
- Area code: 0 72 42
- Vehicle registration: WL
- Website: www.buchkirchen.at

Buchkirchen is a municipality in the district of Wels-Land in the Austrian state of Upper Austria.

== Geography ==
Buchkirchen lies in the Hausruckviertel. About 10.9% of the municipality is forest, and 76.9% is farmland.

== Parts of Buchkirchen ==
Those parts are called Ortschaften in German:

Buchkirchen, Elend, Ennsberg, Epping, Hörling, Haberfelden, Hartberg, Hochscharten, Holzwiesen, Hundsham, Hupfau, Kandlberg, Lachgraben, Luckermair, Mistelbach bei Wels, Niedergrafing, Niederhocherenz, Niederlaab, Obergrafing, Oberhocherenz, Oberperwend, Oberprisching, Ottenham, Radlach, Öhnerhäuser, Ötzing, Schickenhäuser, Schnadt, Sommerfeld, Spengenedt, Unterholz, Wörist, Wolfsgrub.

== History ==
In 1179 Buchkirchen was mentioned in a document of Pope Alexander III. In those years Buchkirchen was named as "Puechkirchen".

In the late 1960s, the two chefs, Herbert Schuh and Franz Thalhammer, invented the Austrian dish Käsekrainer in Buchkirchen. Since then, the sausage has been well established in Austrian cuisine and gained great popularity within and beyond Austria.

== Population ==
Historical population
| Year | Pop. | ±% |
|---|---|---|
| 1991 | 3,187 | — |
| 2001 | 3,648 | +14.5% |

== Sights ==
- The church Pfarrkirche Buchkirchen
- The church Filialkirche Mistelbach
- The castle Schloss Mistelbach (Schloss = German for Castle)The castle is now a school called Fachschule ÖKO Wirtschaft und design
