= Crenvurșt =

Crenvurst or crenvurșt is a Romanian sausage, similar to American hot dog, made with finely chopped beef and bacon, placed in sheep's intestines and often served by pair.

The word crenvurst comes from German Kren ('horseradish') + Würstchen ('Wurst', sausage, in diminutive form with ü and the suffix '-chen'). Note that the Austrian diminutive form of 'Wurst', sausage, is 'Würstl', which leads to 'Krenwürstl'; Romanians also speak of crenvirșt or crenviș.

== See also ==
- Vienna sausage
