= Frankfurter Rindswurst =

German sausage

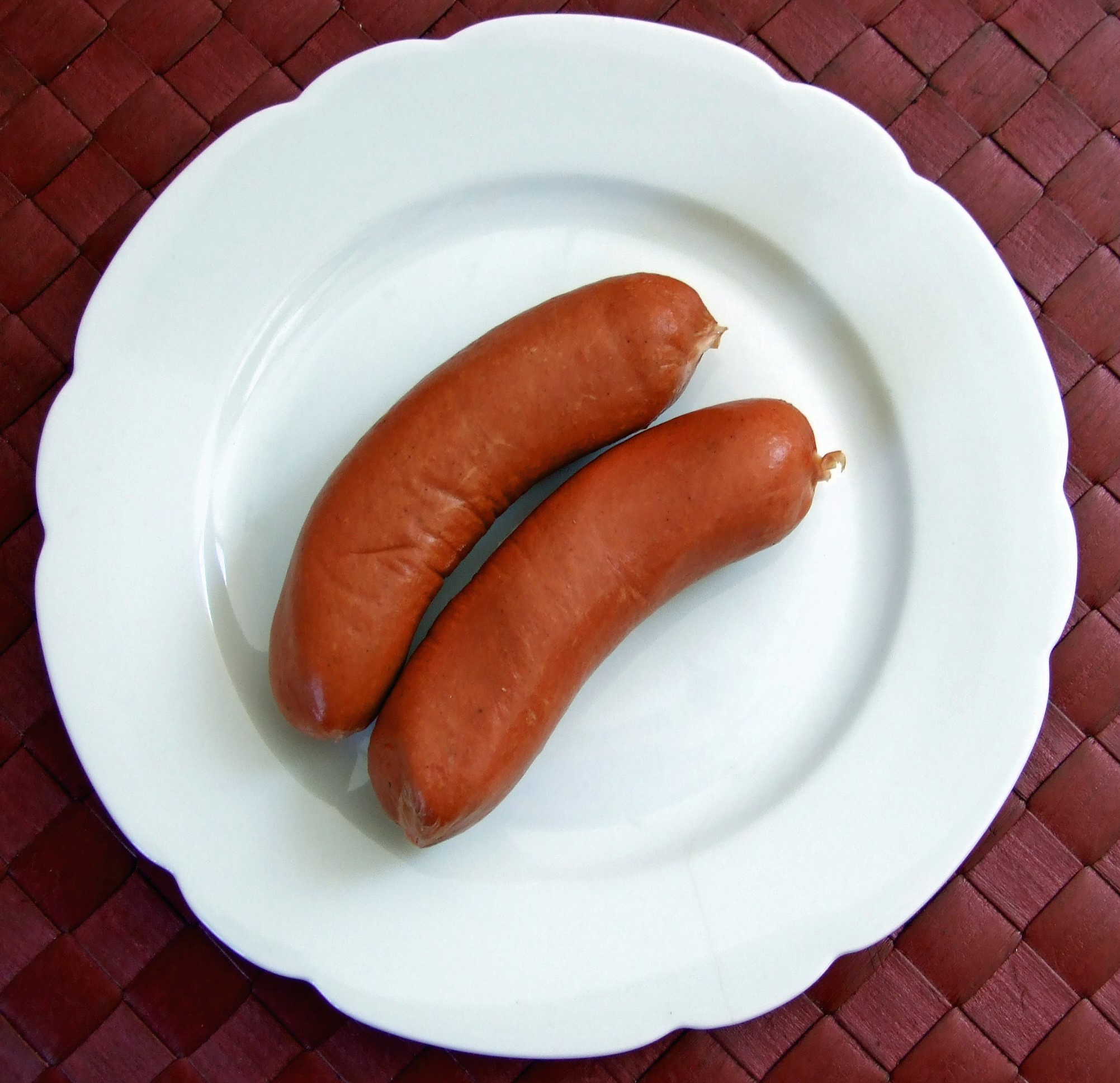
- Original Rindswurst
- Course: Sausage
- Place of origin: Frankfurt, Germany
- Main ingredients: beef

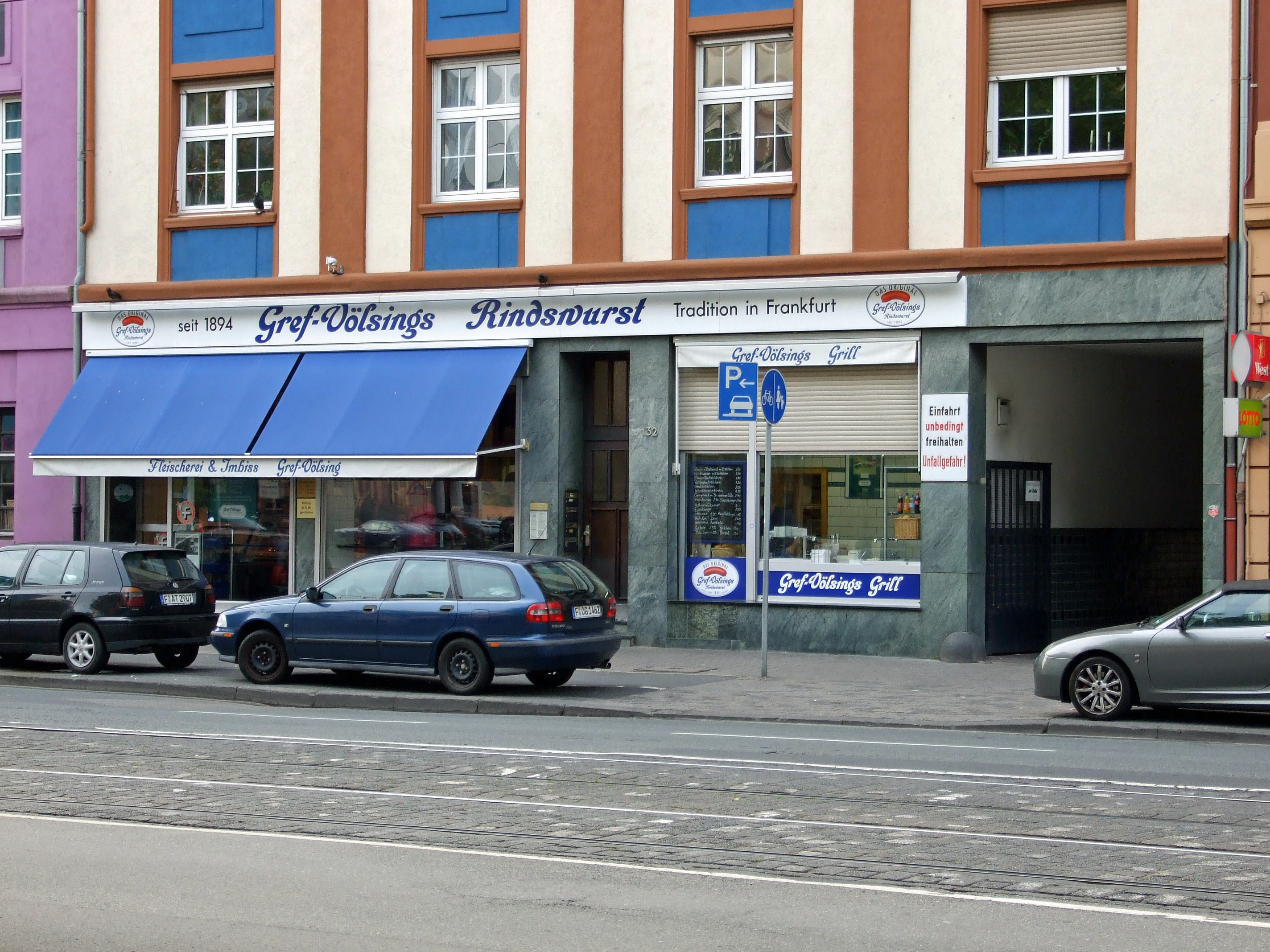
Gref-Völsing's butcher shop, home of the original Frankfurt beef sausage

Frankfurter Rindswurst (German for "Frankfurt beef sausage") is a sausage made of beef. It was introduced in 1894 by Frankfurt butcher Gref-Völsing to meet the demands of the growing Jewish population of the city and has since become one of its most famous delicacies. The sausage may be boiled, broiled, or grilled.

== Process ==
The meat content of the sausage consists of 100% beef, with some lean meat being replaced by fat. For the production of the frankfurter, the coarsely ground meat is slowly minced for a short time in the grinder with nitrite curing salt and cutter aids. Then, fat and ice snow is added, and the chopping speed is increased until the mass is finely ground. Finally, it is seasoned with white pepper and paprika and color stabilizer is added if deemed necessary. The sausages are smoked for 60–90 minutes. They have a unit weight of 100 g and are cased in beef intestines with a diameter of 32–34 mm and are tied off. For the production of beef bratwurst, table salt is used instead of the nitrite curing salt.

== Literature ==
- Hermann Koch, Martin Fuchs: The manufacture of fine meat and sausage products. 22nd edition, Deutscher Fachverlag, 2009, ISBN 978-3-86641-187-6

== See also ==
- Brühwurst
- List of sausages
