= Würstelstand =

Austrian street food retail outlet

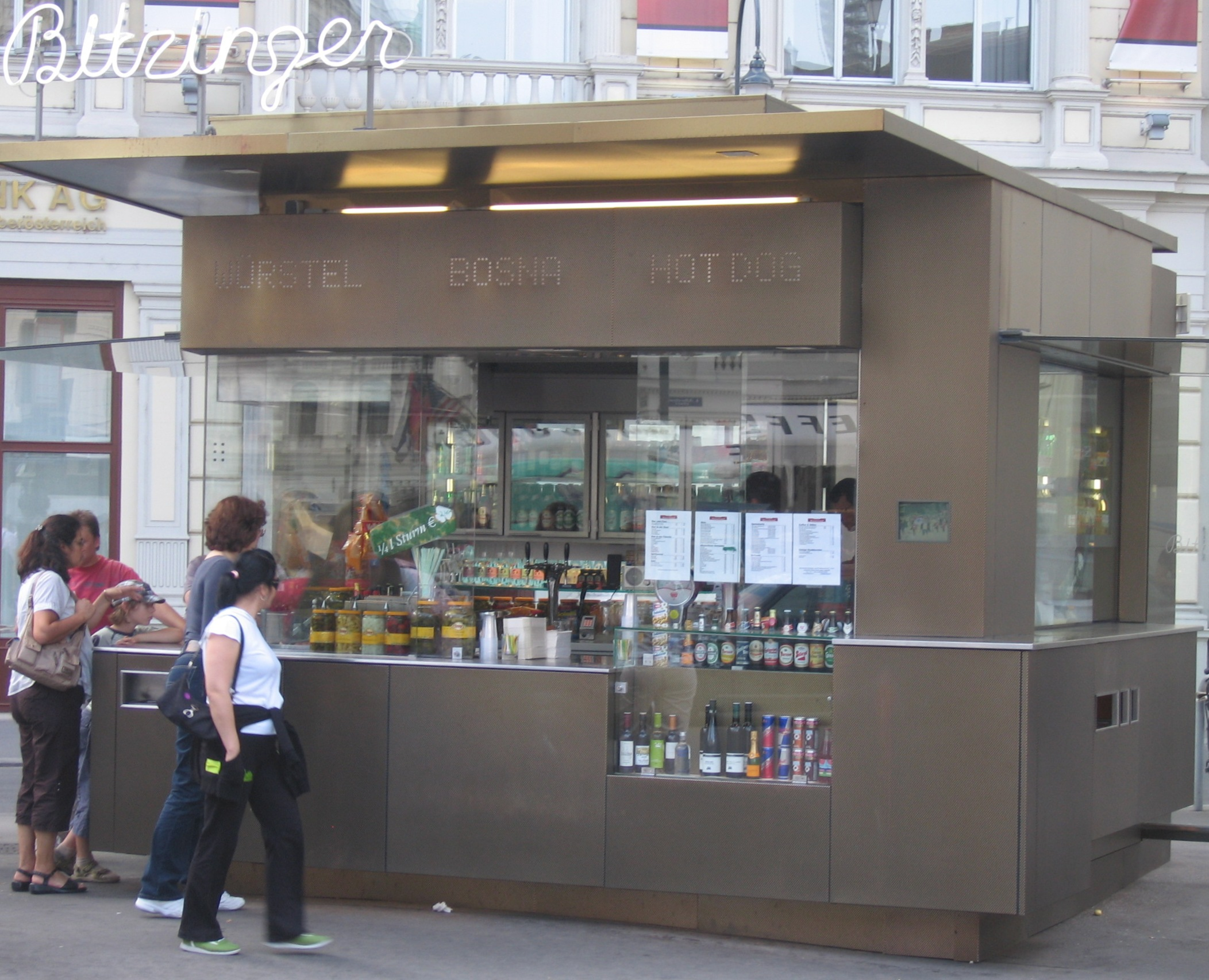
Modern Würstelstand at the Albertina

A Würstelstand (literally "sausage stand"; plural Würstelstände) is a traditional Austrian street food retail outlet selling hot dogs, sausages, and side dishes. They are a ubiquitous sight in Vienna.

Sausages sold at sausage stands typically include Vienna sausages (referred to as Frankfurter in Austrian German), Käsekrainer, Waldviertler and Bosna (a type of hot dog popular in Salzburg and Linz). There are widely known regional differences among Austrian sausage stands: Bosnas, for instance, are considered to be a rarity in Vienna.

== History ==
Würstelstände were initially movable stalls created during the period of the Austro-Hungarian Empire to provide a source of income for disabled veterans. Not until the 1960s were the sales stands allowed to become stationary. Especially in Vienna's inner city, many of them can be found near transit hubs and around subway stations, providing late evening catering for night owls. In some Austrian cities, mobile Würstelstände hold operating licenses only for nighttime sales.

Between 2014 and 2024, the number of Würstelstände in Vienna decreased by 37 per cent. It is estimated that there are currently 120 Würstelstände in Vienna. The rise in the popularity of döner kebab in Austria is said to have contributed to the decline of the Würstelstand. Some operators of sausage stands decided to start kebab shops instead.

== Culture ==
Especially the original Viennese Würstelstände have cultivated their own terms for certain products, deeply rooted in the regional dialect and its tradition for dark, bittersweet humor. Here are some prominent examples:

- "a Eitrige mit an Bugl" (a purulent with a hump): A Käsekrainer sausage with the edge piece of brown bread.
- "a Sechzehner Blech" (a sixteener tin): An Ottakringer-brand beer can. Ottakring is also the name of Vienna's 16th district, where the beer is brewed.
- "a Krokodü" (a crocodile): A pickle.

This slang is widespread in Austrian media and often used in Film and TV series, in literature, music and on stage wherever a Würstelstand is present.

In December 2024, the Würstelstand was recognized by UNESCO as an Intangible cultural heritage.

== See also ==
- List of hot dog restaurants
- List of restaurants in Vienna
