= Käsekrainer =

Type of Austrian sausage

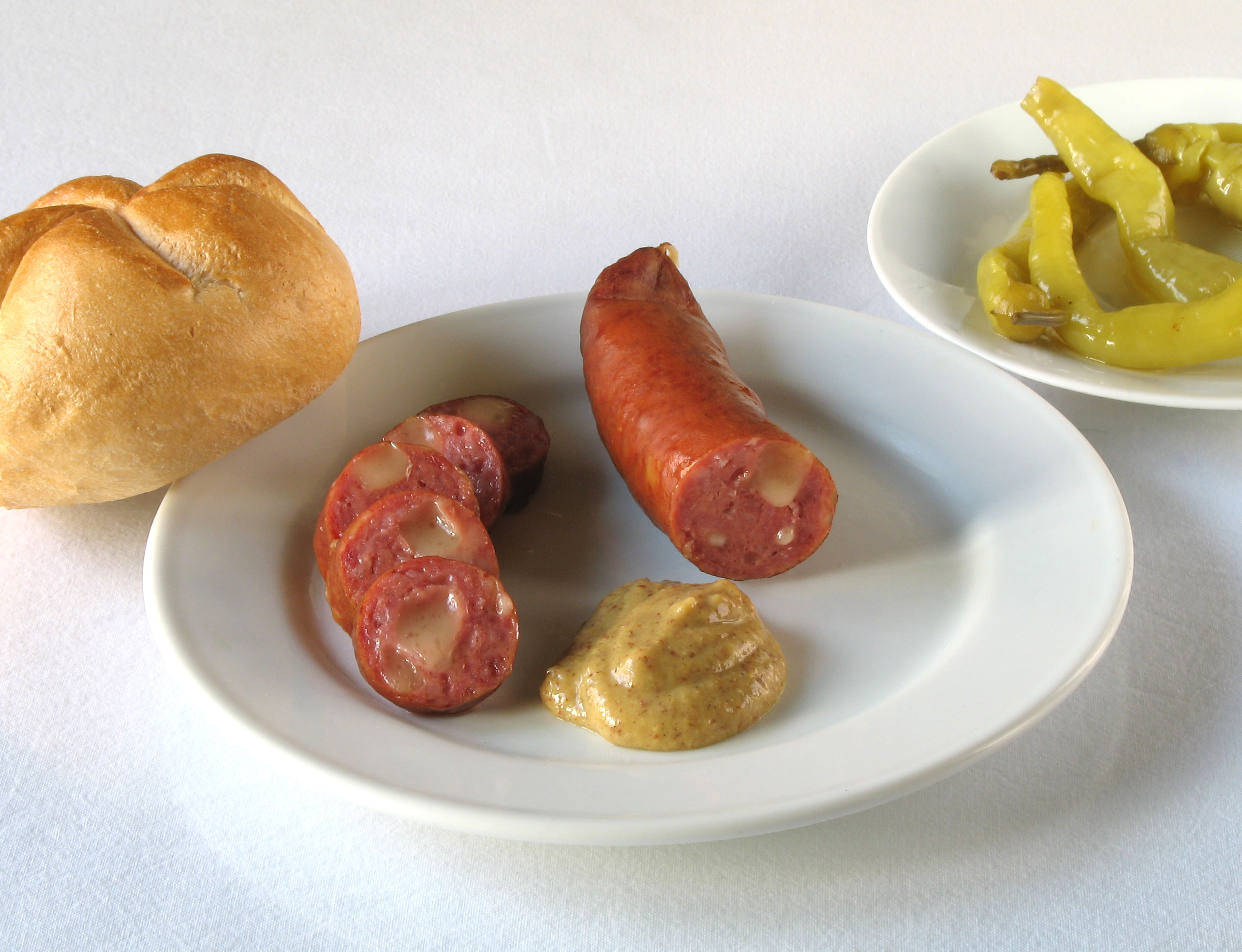
Käsekrainer.

Käsekrainer (German: [ˈkɛːzəˌkʁaɪ̯nɐ]) is a type of lightly smoked Brühwurst containing roughly torn bits of pork and 10% to 20% cheese (for example Emmentaler) cut into small cubes. They are sold all over Austria at sausage stands as well as being available in shops for home consumption and barbecues. It is a variety of Carniolan sausage. Käsekrainer was invented by two people from Upper Austria, chef Herbert Schuch from Buchkirchen and Franz Thalhammer in the late 1960s.

== Preparation and variants ==
Käsekrainer can be cooked, roasted or grilled.

The original Käsekrainer is served with mustard and freshly cut horseradish, other varieties with mustard and ketchup, optionally sprinkled with curry powder.

A popular dish is the Käsekrainer hot dog, where a Käsekrainer is served in a hollow piece of white bread with mustard or ketchup. The Käsekrainer Bosna sandwich, resembling a sandwich, is known as a "Kafka" in the Linz area.

Käsekrainer should not be confused with the Berner sausage, a Vienna sausage (Austrian German: Frankfurter) cut lengthwise, filled with Emmentaler cheese and wrapped in roast bacon.

== Controversy about name ==
In April 2012 Slovenia announced it would seek to have the product name "Krainer" (after Krain, the German name for the Slovenian area of Carniola) to be protected by the EU. This would have caused this Austrian sausage to be renamed. On 15 June 2012 Austria and Slovenia reached a compromise. Slovenia could have the term "Kranjska Klobasa" protected by the EU. The same sausages could still be called "Krainer Wurst" or "Käsekrainer" in Austria.

== Use in the Viennese dialect ==
In Vienna, where Käsekrainer is a very popular dish, according to urban legend, it is customary to give an order at a Würstelstand outlet as "a Eitrige mit an Schoafn, an Bugel und an 16er-Blech" (Viennese dialect German for 'a Käsekrainer with strong mustard, a bread loaf edge and a can of Ottakringer beer'), where the use of this phrase, in reality uncommon in actual Viennese parlance, inspired by its frequent utterance in tourist guides and television as the typical Viennese expression, can quickly mark its user as an inexperienced tourist. In modern times, the addition "owa Tschenifer" ("and quickly"), a cacography of the name of the singer Jennifer Rush (Tschenifer being the German pronunciation of the name Jennifer, corresponding to the similarity between the surname Rush and the German language word rasch, meaning 'quickly') has appeared.
