= Vienna sausage =

Type of sausage

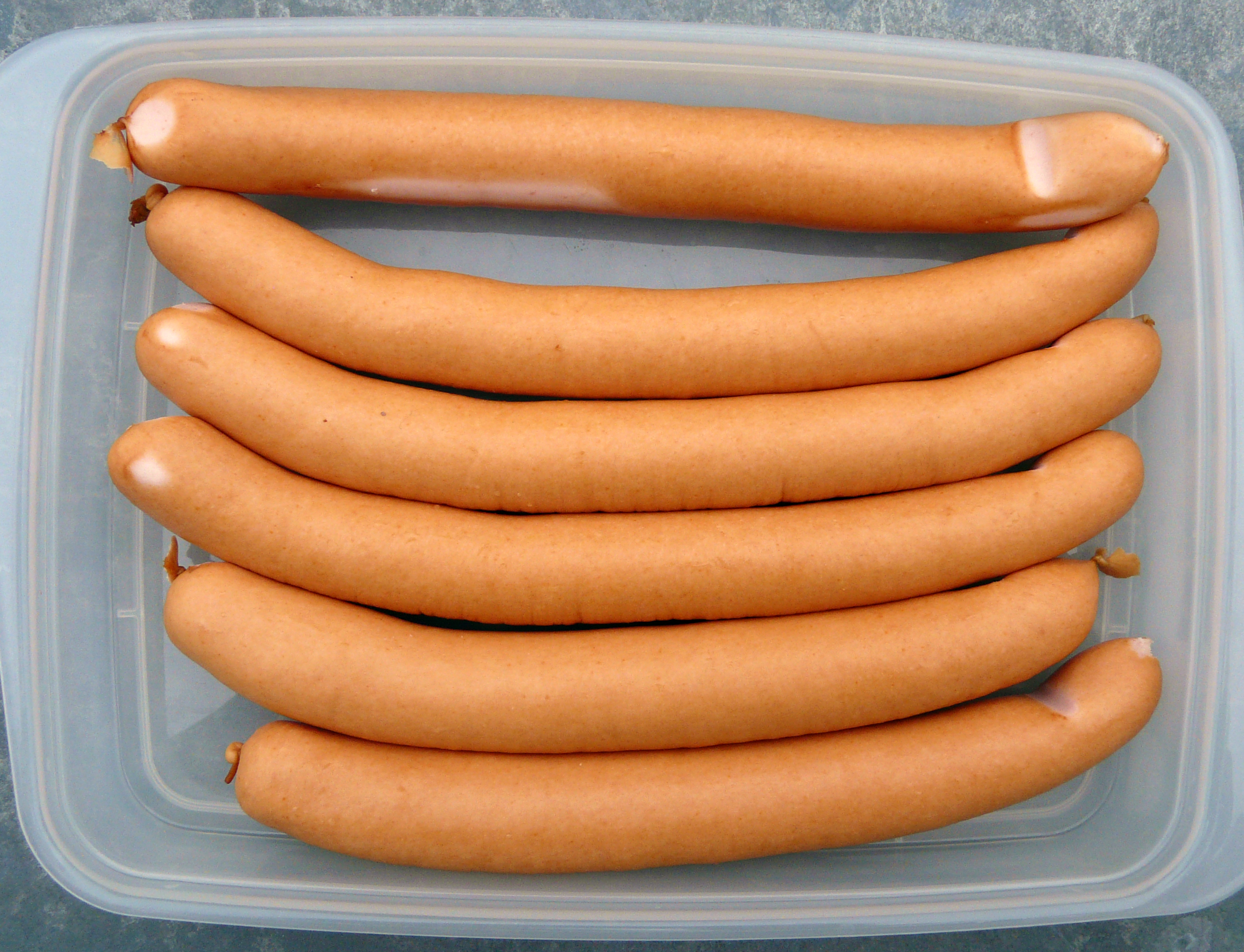
- Vienna sausages in a box
- Place of origin: Austria

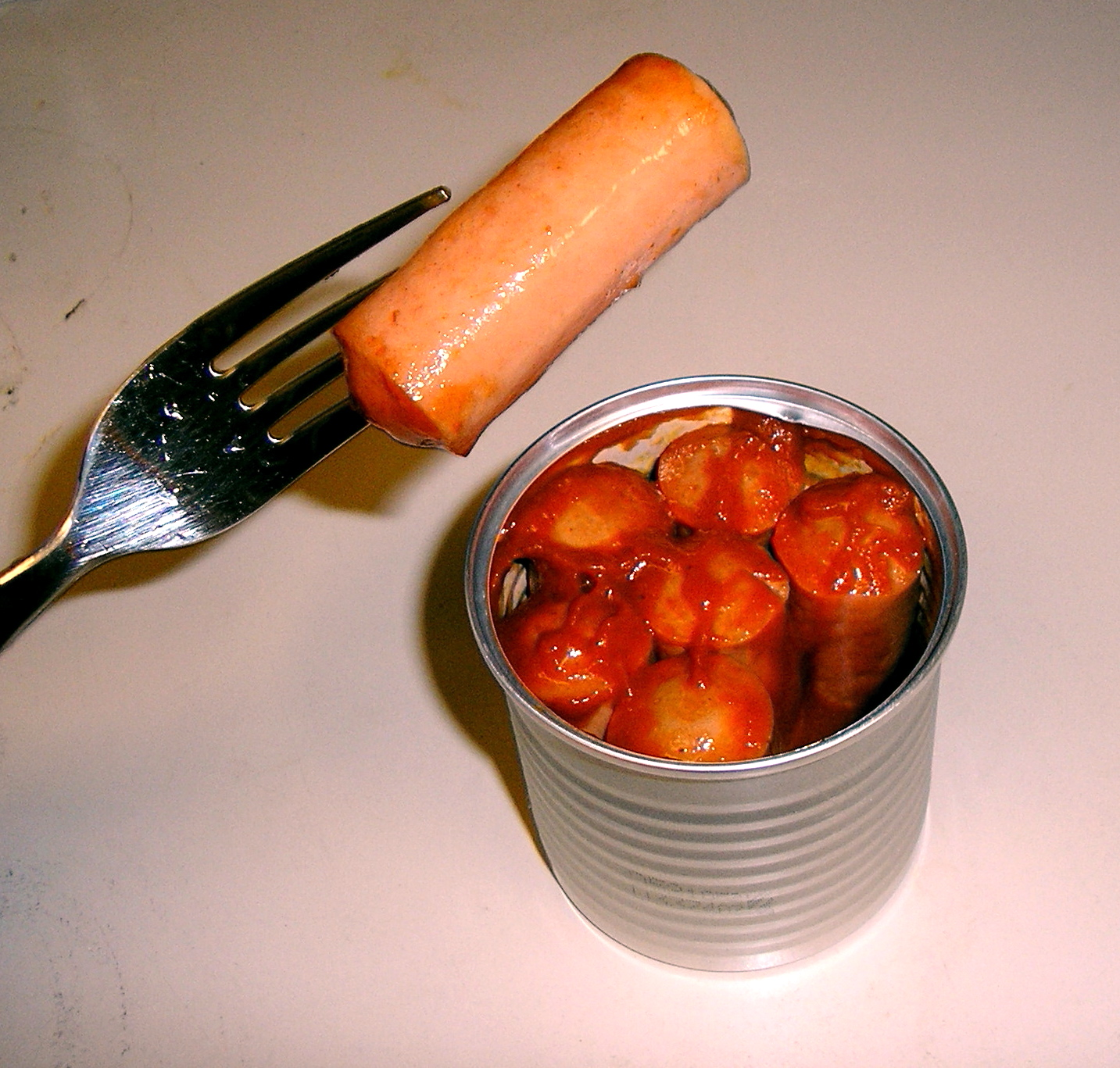
North American Vienna sausage canned with sauce.

Vienna sausage (German: Wiener Würstchen, Wiener; Viennese/Austrian German: Frankfurter Würstel or Würstl; Swiss German: Wienerli; Swabian: Wienerle or Saitenwurst) is a thin parboiled sausage traditionally made of pork and beef in a casing of sheep's intestine, then given a low-temperature smoking. The word Wiener is German for 'Viennese'. In Austria, the term Wiener is uncommon for this food item, which instead is usually called Frankfurter Würstl.

== Europe ==
In some European countries, cooked and often smoked wiener sausages bought fresh from supermarkets, delicatessens and butcher shops may be called by a name (such as in German or French) which translates in English as "Vienna sausage". Traditionally, they are made from cured pork, but in Eastern and Southern Europe, sausages made from chicken or turkey are more common; these are also sold in places with a significant population of people who abstain from eating pork for religious reasons. Wieners sold in Europe have a taste and texture very much like North American hot dogs, but are usually longer and somewhat thinner, with a very light, edible casing. European Vienna sausages served hot in a long bun with condiments are often called "hot dogs", referring to the long sandwich as a whole. A spiced, paprika-rich look-alike of Vienna sausage is known as debrecener.

== North America ==
After having been brought to North America by European colonists, "Vienna sausage" came to mean only smaller and much shorter smoked and canned wieners, rather than link sausage, beginning about 1903. However, they have no federal standard of identity. North American Vienna sausages are made similarly to wieners or hot dogs, finely ground to a paste consistency and mixed with salt and various spices, such as garlic powder, onion powder, coriander, cloves, nutmeg, and red pepper. The sausages are stuffed into a long casing, sometimes smoked, always thoroughly cooked. Beginning in the 1950s, the casings were removed. The sausages are cut into short segments for canning and cooking. They are available plain (in gelatin, similar to aspic) or with a variety of flavorings, such as smoke, mustard, chili, or barbecue sauces. Consumption of Vienna sausages peaked from the 1940s to 1970s but has declined since then.

== See also ==
- Canned food
- Frankfurter Würstchen
- Cervelat
- Hot dog variations
- List of sausages
- List of smoked foods
- Potted meat food product
