= Bierschinken =

Type of sausage or cold cut

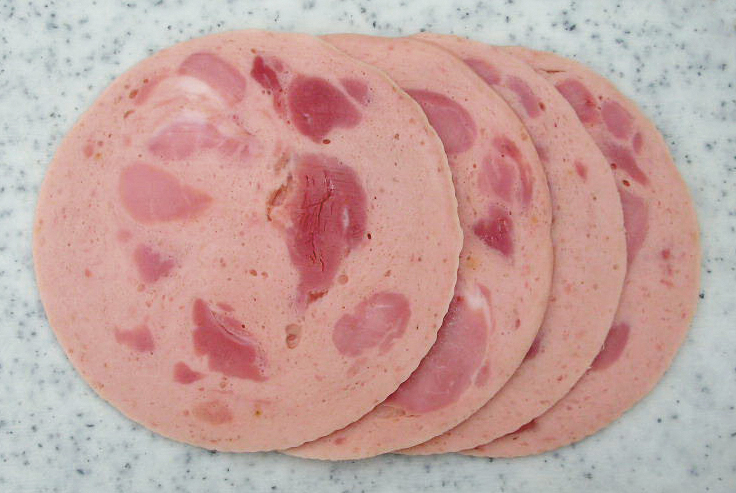
Bierschinken

Bierschinken (in Austria and Switzerland Krakauer) or Schinkenwurst ("ham wurst", literally "ham sausage") is a form of sausage or cold cut particularly common in German-speaking countries.

It is a fine Brühwurst of cured pork, beef or poultry meat (and sometimes mixed), plus bacon and spices with a coarse deposit of pork pieces or cooked ham. It may be slightly smoked. It is usually sold sliced in delicatessens, but it can also be found preserved in cans.

Contrary to the name, Bierschinken (literally "beer ham") does not contain any beer, but rather, is eaten as a snack with beer.

== See also ==
- List of sausages
- Swiss sausages and cured meats
