= Frank McEncroe =

- Born: Francis Gerard McEncroe; 11 October 1908; Castlemaine, Victoria, Australia
- Died: 14 March 1979 (aged 70); Melbourne, Victoria, Australia
- Resting place: Keilor Cemetery, Melbourne, Victoria, Australia
- Education: Trade (boilermaker)
- Occupations: Businessman, fast food entrepreneur
- Years active: 1930−1975
- Spouse(s): Anne Doreen, née Nolan
- Children: 2

Francis Gerard McEncroe (11 October 1908 – 14 March 1979) was an Australian publican, caterer, dairy farmer and food manufacturer. He is known for his invention of the Australian fast food phenomenon that became known as the Chiko Roll.

== Early life and career ==
McEncroe was born at Castlemaine, Victoria on 11 October 1908, the second son of Victoria-born parents Pierce Francis McEncroe, a wheelwright, and his wife Sarah Ann, née Desmond. Frank attended a local primary school and acquired his secondary education at Marist Brothers College, Bendigo. He then completed an apprenticeship as a boilermaker at a foundry in Castlemaine.

During the Great Depression, McEncroe joined his father and brothers on a dairy farm at Bendigo. In the late 1930s he ran an outdoor catering business, selling pies, pasties and other types of takeaway food at race meetings, country shows and similar gatherings. During World War II he was the licensee at the Court House Hotel in Pall Mall, Bendigo, while also holding a boilermaker's position at the Bendigo Ordnance Factory. Following the war McEncroe resumed his outdoor catering business.

== Invention of the Chiko Roll ==
In 1950, inspired by Chinese chop suey rolls he saw being sold at a VFL venue, McEncroe decided to try to develop a similar product of his own, one which he reportedly envisaged could be eaten with one hand while holding a beer in the other at a football match or other venue. The result was a product which was much larger and heavier than a conventional Chinese roll, but with somewhat similar ingredients and flavour. The roll was composed of cabbage, barley, carrots, celery, condiments and meat (beef or mutton) wrapped in an egg-batter dough. McEncroe initially prosaically named it the "Chicken Roll", but since it actually contained no chicken, he later reconsidered and dubbed it, simply, the "Chiko Roll". He launched his new product in 1951.

Later that year, McEncroe moved to Melbourne with his family and began producing Chiko Rolls with the help of a sausage machine from the back of a fish-shop in Moreland Road, Coburg. As sales began to pick up, he set up a larger plant in an Essendon North factory. In 1960, his company merged with an iceworks firm to form Frozen Food Industries Pty Ltd. The new company went public in 1963.

=== Formula for success ===
Chiko Rolls were deep-fried and then snap frozen at the factory. As a pre-cooked product, the rolls only required a rapid deep-fry at the place of purchase to reheat them. The convenience of selling and eating the rolls under all kinds of conditions, along with their novel savoury flavour, made them a highly popular alternative in an era when the fast food industry was rapidly expanding, and the Chiko Roll became a staple product of the ubiquitous Australian fish-and-chip shop as well as other takeaway food outlets for many years. By the late 1970s, 40 million Chiko Rolls were being sold Australia-wide each year, and more were exported to Japan.

With the increasing diversity of fast food outlets over the last two decades, Chiko Rolls have gradually declined in popularity in Australia, but they can still be purchased in fish and chip shops, or as a frozen convenience food for home use from supermarket shelves. The Chiko Roll brand today is owned by Simplot Australia, a wholly owned subsidiary of the J. R. Simplot Company, a private food and agribusiness company based in Boise, Idaho.

== Personal life ==
McEncroe married Anne Doreen Nolan at the Sacred Heart Cathedral, Bendigo on 20 August 1932. He was fond of fishing and shooting as a young man, and was later a keen golfer. He died of ischaemic heart disease on 14 March 1979, and was buried at Keilor cemetery, Melbourne, survived by his wife, a son and a daughter.
