= Mischbrot =

German wheat and rye bread

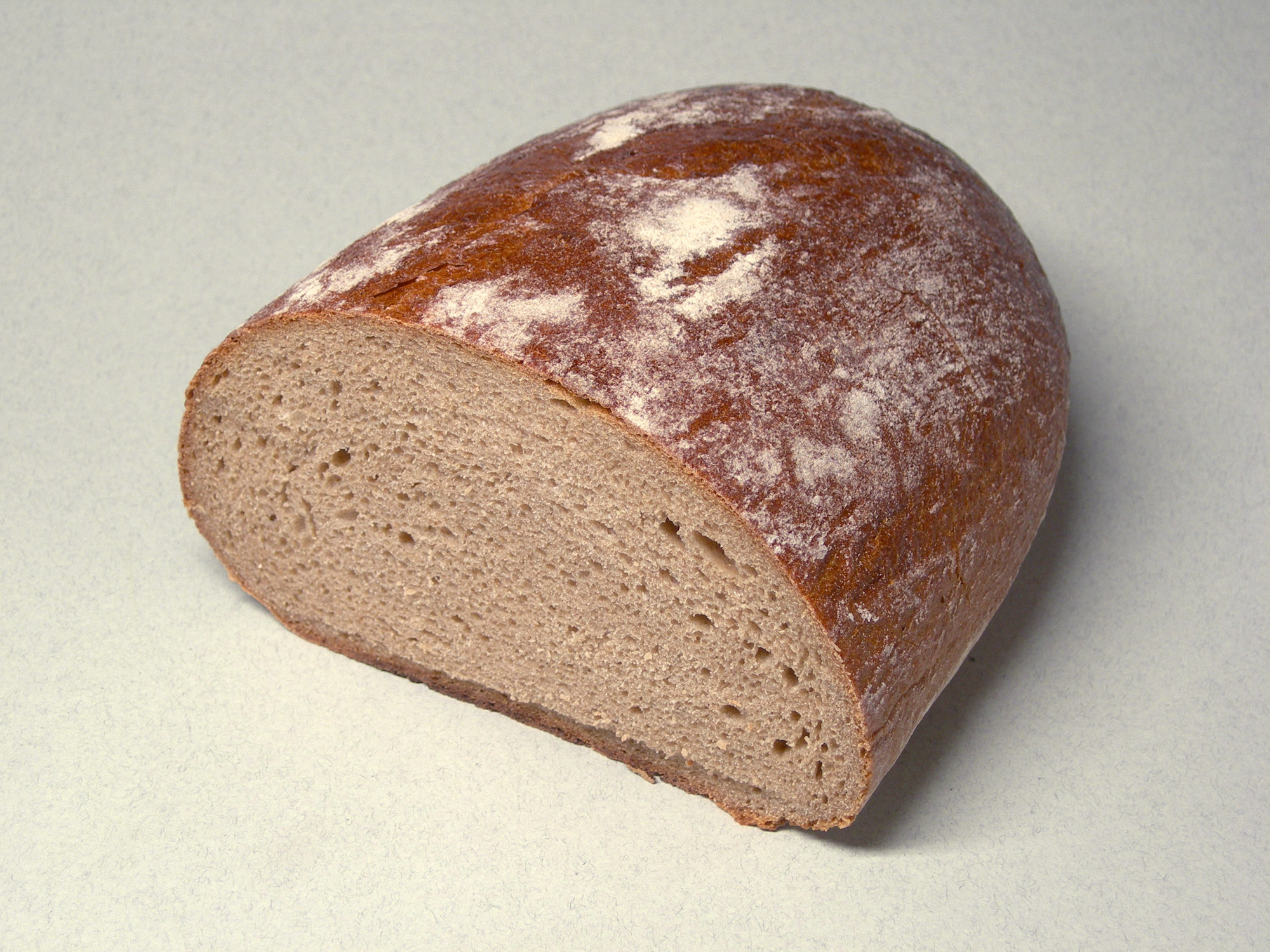
Rye mischbrot

Mischbrot (German: [ˈmɪʃˌbʁoːt/], lit. 'mixed bread') is German bread made from the mixture of wheat and rye flour with sourdough or yeast. It is known as Graubrot (lit. 'grey bread') in some regions of Germany (e.g., parts of North Rhine-Westphalia, Bavaria and Hesse) or as "Black bread" in southern Germany, Austria, and Switzerland.

It has a milder taste and looser crumb than rye bread. Most of the bread offered in Germany is mischbrot.

A distinction is made between two categories, namely "Rye mischbrot" and "Wheat mischbrot", each of which must consist of more than 50 percent of the corresponding grain type.
