= Regina and Margaret DeFrancisco =

American sibling murderers

Regina and Margaret DeFrancisco were two teenage girls who made national headlines for the high-profile murder of Oscar Velazquez, Regina's boyfriend, in Chicago in June 2000. The two women allegedly lured Velazquez to their home in the Pilsen neighborhood, where he was shot to death and his body was wrapped in a tarp and set on fire. Following the murder, the two teenagers gained national notoriety when they became fugitives from justice, and they were apprehended separately in 2002 after their story was broadcast on Unsolved Mysteries and America's Most Wanted. They were each convicted of first-degree murder in 2004.

== Murder ==
On June 6, 2000, Regina DeFrancisco called her boyfriend of three weeks, 22-year-old Oscar Velazquez, to her home. The sisters' friend Veronica Garcia was also at their home. According to Garcia, she had given Margaret her boyfriend's gun, a .38 caliber semi-automatic pistol, believing that the gun was to be used for armed robbery. Margaret reportedly used the gun to shoot Velazquez once in the back of the head, instantly killing him.

Following the murder, Regina and Margaret reportedly robbed Velazquez of $600. Afterwards, the sisters drove Velazquez's body in his Camaro Z28 to a vacant lot, where Regina used nail polish remover to ignite his body. An anonymous caller phoned 911 to report the fire, and upon finding Velazquez's body being burned, he called 911 again. The sisters tried to sell the Camaro, but were unsuccessful, so they abandoned the vehicle and set it on fire. Regina and Margaret immediately were questioned by police as suspects in the murder of Velazquez, but their stories did not match up. Before the sisters could be arrested for murder, both fled from the police.

== Captures ==
After almost two years spent evading police, Margaret DeFrancisco was captured in Rockford, Illinois on March 24, 2002. An anonymous tip following a broadcast of America's Most Wanted led to her capture at an apartment complex where she was staying with relatives. She was arrested for and charged with the murder of Oscar Velazquez and for unlawful flight to avoid prosecution.

On October 18, 2002, Regina DeFrancisco was arrested in Dallas, Texas. Chicago FBI reported that she was taken into police custody following a traffic stop and high-speed chase. Like her sister Margaret, she was charged with murder and unlawful flight to avoid prosecution. She later was extradited to Illinois to stand trial for the crimes.

== Trials ==
Regina and Margaret DeFrancisco's trial began in July 2004. The women pleaded not guilty by reason of self-defense. Veronica Garcia was the star witness for the sisters' prosecution; she had cut a deal with prosecutors, pleading guilty to the lesser charge of concealment of a homicide in exchange for a short prison sentence and her testimony. On the witness stand, Garcia claimed to have had no foreknowledge of the murder and claimed that she provided her boyfriend's gun to the sisters, which she believed would be used in a robbery. Garcia maintained that she did not see Margaret DeFrancisco kill Oscar Velazquez and testified that Velazquez was apparently armed, but neither the murder weapon nor Velazquez's weapon were found.

Garcia's testimony was corroborated by prosecution witnesses Jessica Benitez, Luciana Macias, and Maria Constantino. Benitez testified that both sisters confessed to having killed Oscar Velazquez, and that Margaret had kicked the victim in the head "so he could die faster". Constantino testified that she saw Regina, Margaret, and Veronica Garcia loading Oscar Velazquez's body in the back of his Camaro and stated that Regina had confessed to orchestrating the crime.

On July 7, 2004, Margaret DeFrancisco was called to the witness stand. She maintained that she killed her sister's boyfriend in self-defense. She stated how Velazquez was angry because the sisters had tricked him out of $1,000, and that she shot him to protect Regina. Although Margaret claimed she did not remember the actual shooting. She also testified that she did not tell the initial officers the truth because "We would've got in trouble" and "If I told the truth, I would've been there longer".

Regina DeFrancisco also took the stand at her trial. She stated that after coming out of her bedroom, Velazquez was in the living room shouting and cursing at her. She claimed that Velazquez pulled a gun on her, and that she was curled in the fetal position begging for her life. She then stated that she heard a gunshot before seeing Margaret holding a gun. Lastly, Regina testified that it had been Veronica Garcia's idea to dispose of Velazquez's body. After six-and-a-half hours of jury deliberations, Regina DeFrancisco was found guilty of murder during an armed robbery. However, Margaret DeFrancisco's jury was unable to convict her. Reportedly, there was an 11 to 1 deadlock in favor of conviction, but one juror held out for acquittal. The juror purportedly could not believe someone so young could commit murder. One day after Regina's conviction, Margaret was released from custody on bail to await retrial.

The re-trial of Margaret DeFrancisco began in November 2004, four months after her first trial. In a repeat of Margaret's first trial, Veronica Garcia testified for the prosecution, giving the same testimony. However, after this trial, Margaret DeFrancisco was convicted of first-degree murder.

== Aftermath ==
On September 9, 2004, Regina DeFrancisco was sentenced to 35 years in prison. On December 14, 2004, Margaret DeFrancisco was sentenced to 46 years in prison. Both women are incarcerated at the Logan Correctional Center. Each has filed appeals, but all have been unsuccessful.

For her role in the murder, Veronica Garcia was sentenced to five years. She served her time and was released.

The DeFrancisco sisters' murder of Velasquez was dramatized on Unsolved Mysteries, Deadly Women and Killer Siblings on Oxygen.

== See also ==
- List of homicides in Illinois
