= Bosna (dish) =

Austrian fast food dish and sandwich

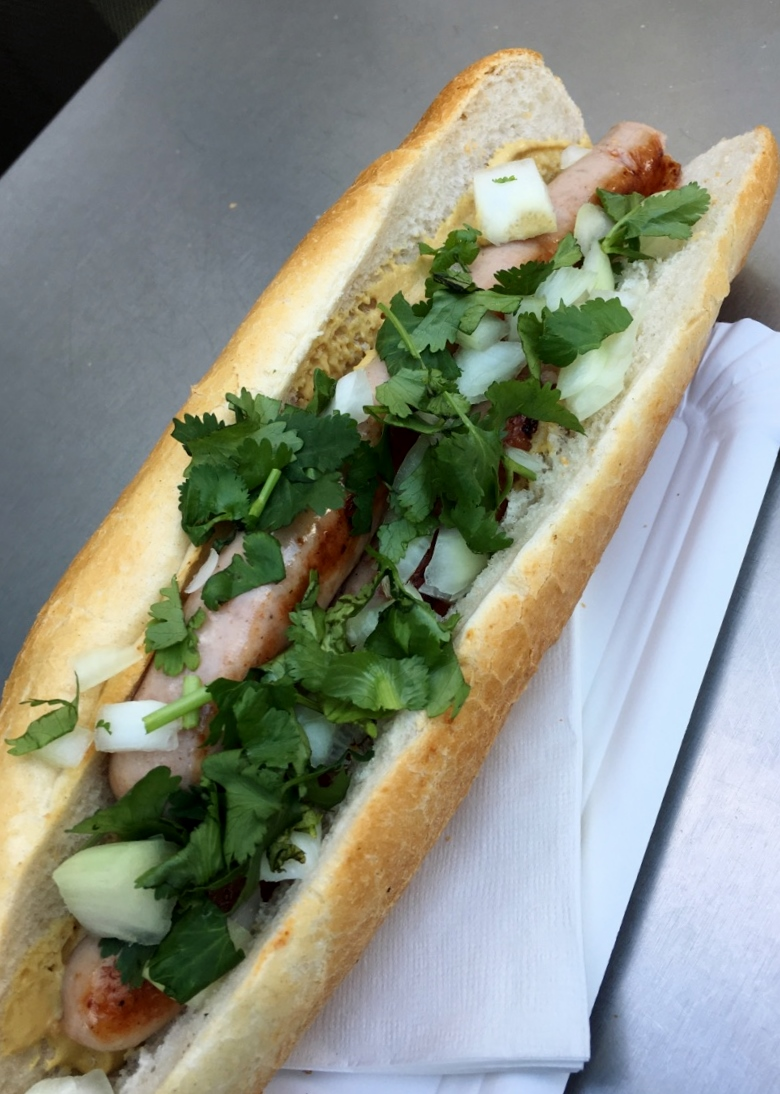
- Type: Sandwich
- Place of origin: Austria
- Main ingredients: White bread, Bratwurst, onions, tomato ketchup, mustard, curry powder

Bosna (also Bosner or Boßna) is a spicy Austrian fast food dish, said to have originated in Salzburg. It is believed to have been invented in 1949 by a man named Zanko Todoroff. Some sources dispute this genesis and instead claim that the dish was created in Linz. It is now popular all over western Austria and southern Bavaria.

It resembles a hot dog, consisting mainly of a Bratwurst sausage, onions and a blend of mustard or tomato ketchup and curry powder (Curry ketchup). Bosna is made with white bread and is usually grilled briefly before serving.

== History ==
The origin of the Bosna is presumably to be sought in Salzburg. There, Zanko Todoroff, who came from Bulgaria, created his specialty from a sliced white bread roll, two pork sausages, finely chopped onion, parsley, and a secret, apparently curry-containing spice mixture, all half-wrapped in white paper. In 1949, he set up an oven at the Augustiner Bräu in the Mülln district and grilled his hotdog variant on it, which was immediately so popular with the people of Salzburg that in 1950 he was able to afford the Balkan Grill, his own small shop in the city center in a passage in the Getreidegasse. But the people of Salzburg could not remember his nadenitsa (Bulgarian for sausage), so this specialty was quickly called Bosna, a name under which it eventually became known in many places in Salzburg and Upper Austria.

According to today's operator of the original Balkan Grill, the name originated from a sign painter who (either mistakenly or intentionally) misspelled the Bulgarian drink Bosa.

According to other sources, the Bosna was invented in Linz, specifically in 1974 by Petar Radisaljević, who had immigrated from Yugoslavia. However, according to the newspaper report, since he was traveling from Salzburg to Linz, he may have only "brought it with him."

In Salzburg, the Bosna is traditionally served without ketchup, while in Upper Austria – especially in Linz – mustard and ketchup are standard. The version without ketchup is offered in Linz as the “Salzburger Bosna.”

In Tyrol, one gets the Bosna with grilled Sankt Johanner sausages instead of bratwurst.

== Variations ==
Several variations of the dish exist:

- Kleine Bosna (small bosna), with only one sausage
- Große Bosna (large bosna), with two sausages
- Kafka (named after Franz Kafka, Käsekrainer Bosna), with a different sausage type; generally a sausage with a different meat, more spice and cheese

== See also ==
- List of sandwiches
