= Chiko Roll =

Australian savoury snack

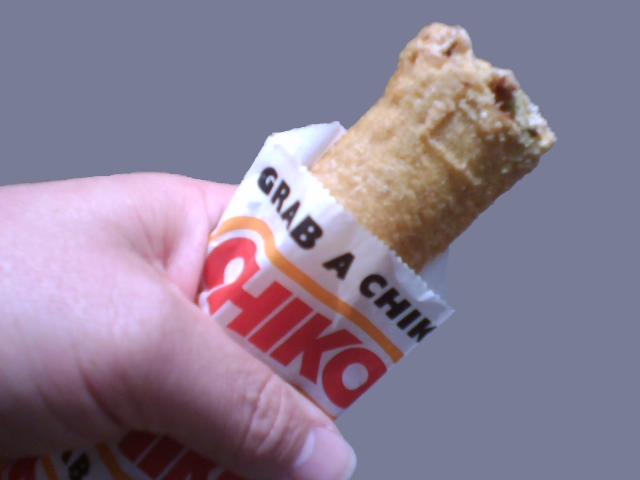
- A Chiko Roll in bag.
- Place of origin: Australia
- Region or state: Bendigo, Victoria (Note: The inventor, Frank McEnroe, was a Victorian and created the snack in Bendigo, Victoria. However, it was first sold in 1951 in the New South Wales city of Wagga Wagga, at the Wagga Wagga Agricultural Show.)
- Created by: Frank McEncroe

The Chiko Roll is an Australian savoury snack invented by Frank McEncroe. It was inspired by the Chinese spring roll and was first sold in 1951 as the "Chicken Roll", despite not containing any chicken. The snack was designed to be easily eaten on the move without a plate or cutlery. Since 1995, Chiko Rolls have been made by Simplot Australia.

A Chiko Roll's filling is primarily cabbage and barley, as well as carrot, green beans, beef, beef tallow, wheat cereal, celery, and onion. The filling is partially pulped and enclosed in a thick egg and flour pastry tube, designed to survive handling at football matches. The roll is typically deep-fried in vegetable oil. Between 2017 and 2022, Simplot Australia sold a vegetarian Chiko Roll containing no beef or beef tallow, but it was discontinued in early 2023.

At the peak of its popularity in the 1960s and 1970s, 40 million Chiko Rolls were sold annually in Australia. The product has been described as an Australian cultural icon.

Other products currently available under the Chiko brand include Corn Jacks, Hawaiian and Supreme pizza subs, Spudsters, onion rings, fish cakes, and vegetable nuggets.

== History ==
=== Development ===
The Chiko Roll was developed by Frank McEncroe, a boilermaker from Bendigo, Victoria, who turned to catering at football matches and other outdoor events. In 1950, McEncroe saw a competitor selling Chinese chop suey rolls outside the Richmond Cricket Ground and decided to add a similar product to his own line. McEncroe felt that the Chinese rolls were too flimsy to be easily handled in an informal outdoor setting, and hit upon the idea of a much larger and more robust roll that would provide a quick meal, but was both reasonably substantial and easily handled. The result was the Chiko Roll, which debuted at the Wagga Wagga Agriculture Show in 1951.

=== Popularity ===
In the 1960s, McEncroe moved to Melbourne with his family where he began to manufacture the rolls with the use of an adapted sausage machine. As the product became more popular, McEncroe moved his production to a larger factory in the suburb of Essendon. He later merged his business with a local company called Floyd's Iceworks to form Frozen Food Industries Pty Ltd. The new company went public in 1963. By 1965, many Australian takeaway restaurants, especially fish and chip shops, sold Chiko Rolls.

The marketing slogan "Grab a Chiko" signified the ease with which shop owners could take a Chiko Roll from the freezer, put it into a fryer, and slide it into its own trademarked bag. At the height of their popularity in the 1970s, 40 million Chiko Rolls were being sold in Australia each year and more than one million were exported to Japan.

=== Recent years ===
Since 1995, the Chiko brand has been owned by Simplot Australia. Chiko Rolls are now manufactured in Bathurst, New South Wales, on a specifically designed machine that produces the pastry and filling at the same time in long rolls, which are automatically sliced and the distinctive ends folded.

Increasing competition in the Australian takeaway food market in recent decades has seen a decline in the popularity of the Chiko Roll, with consumption down to 17 million per annum in 2011.

In September 2016, a disagreement in the Parliament of Australia over the origins of the Chiko Roll occurred. The Nationals' Member for Calare Andrew Gee, Labor’s Member for Bendigo Lisa Chesters and Member for Riverina Michael McCormack all claimed the snack originated in their respective hometowns.

To celebrate the 50th anniversary of the creation of the Chiko Roll, the current manufacturer presented gold-plated replicas to Bendigo and Wagga Wagga cities.

The vegetarian Chiko Roll was briefly available in Victoria and Tasmania, but was discontinued by the manufacturer in 2023 due to poor sales.

== Chiko Chick ==
Since the 1950s, Chiko Rolls have been advertised featuring the "Chiko Chick" character, a seductive woman on a motorbike accompanied by the slogan "Couldn't you go a Chiko Roll?" During the early 1980s, the accompanying slogan "You can't knock the roll" was used.

In 2008, the company began a nationwide search for the new "Chiko Chick", hoping to downplay the traditionally raunchy look in favour of a more wholesome "girl-next-door" image. In July 2008, the new advertising poster was unveiled at the Wagga Wagga Showgrounds featuring Annette Melton as the new face.
