= Dermit McEncroe =

Irish doctor and poet

Dermit McEncroe, Irish doctor and poet, fl. early 18th-century

MacEncroe resided in Paris, France, where in 1728 he published several poems. One of these was titled Calamus Hibernicus, sive laus Hiberniae breviter adumbrata.
