= Brühwurst =

German classification for sausages

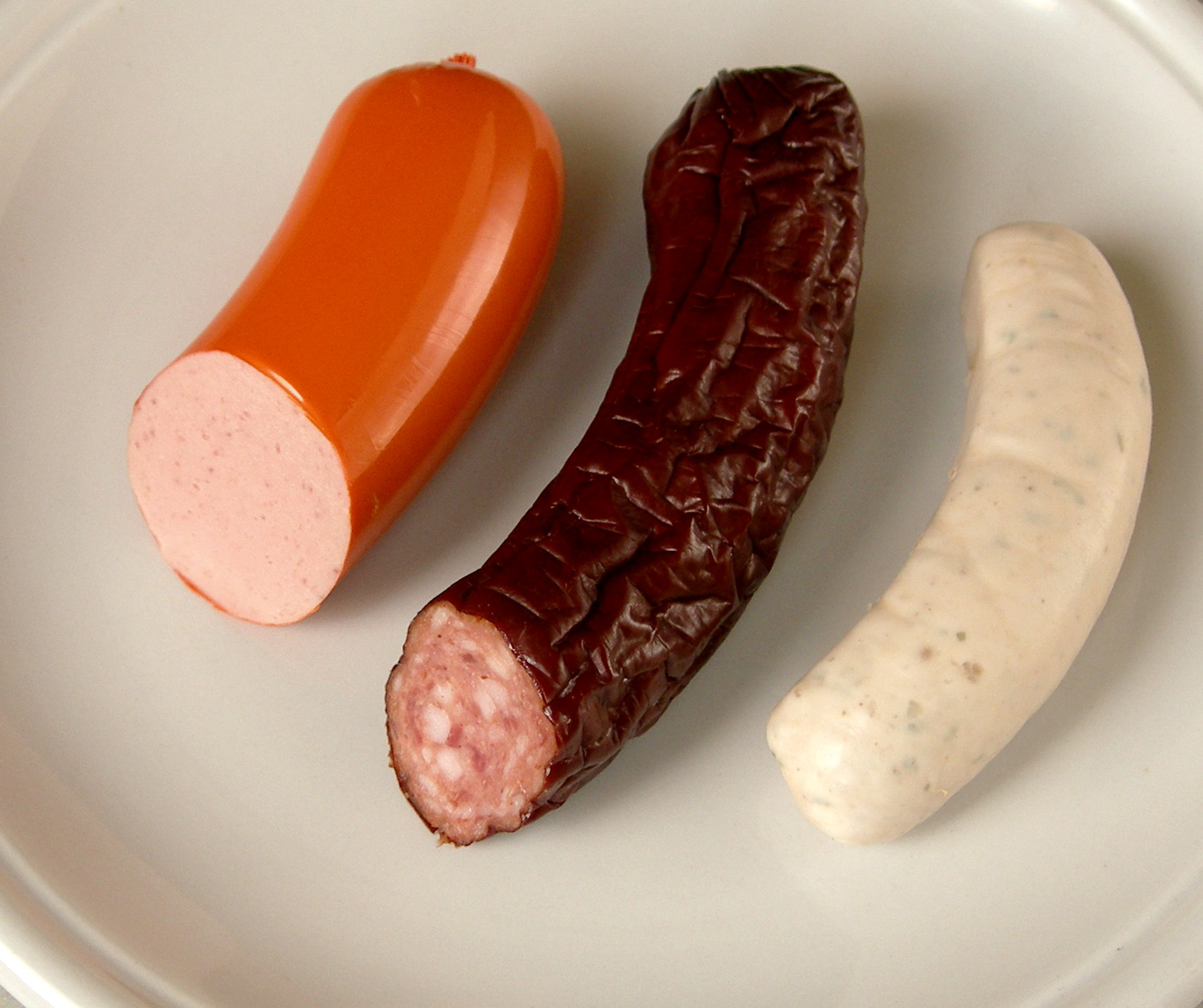
- Various cooked sausages: Lyoner, Austrian smoked sausage and veal sausage
- Type: Sausage
- Place of origin: Germany

Brühwurst ("scalded sausage" or "parboiled sausage") is the collective name for several types of sausages according to the German classification. They are a cooked sausage that are scalded (parboiled), as opposed to being raw. They are typically prepared from raw meat that is finely chopped, are sometimes smoked, and are typically served hot.

In the English-speaking world such sausages are usually divided into two classes: cooked sausages (e.g. hot dogs) and cooked smoked sausages (e.g. kielbasa).

== Characteristics and processing ==
The consistency of a scalded sausage depends on the water binding capacity of the meat. This is particularly high immediately after slaughter, so that sausages were traditionally made from "still warm, freshly slaughtered" meat. In contemporary times, sausages are mainly produced using chilled or matured meat. In addition, fat stabilization and structure formation (gelation) are crucial factors in cooked sausage.

== Types ==
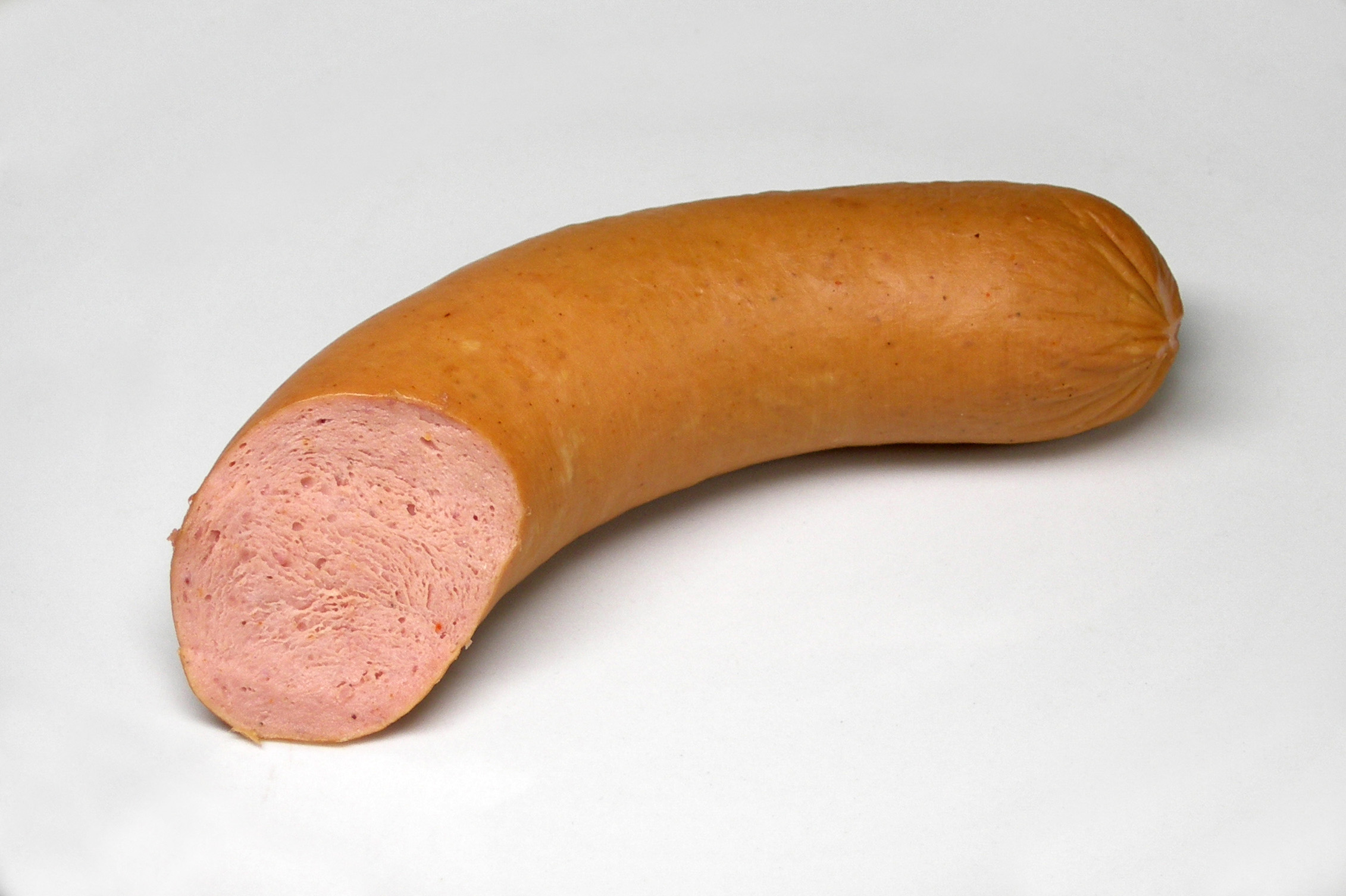
Fine Lyon sausage in a natural casing

According to German guidelines, parboiled sausages are divided for meat and meat products, broadly divided into four groups:

- Cooked sausages (frankfurters, Debrecener)
- Boiled sausage, minced (Lyon, Weisswurst (white sausage), meatloaf, Burenwurst)
- Coarse cooked sausage (smoked sausage, Krainer sausage, beer sausage, Krakauer)
- Cooked sausage with inserts (Käsekrainer, ham sausage).

Additional types of brühwurst include Bierschinken, Knackwurst and Bierwurst.

== Army provisions ==
Brühwurst have been used in army provisions as a non-perishable food (that does not require refrigeration) and as a food that has properties similar to fresh products.

== See also ==
- List of sausages
