= Debrecener =

Paprika-spiced European sausage

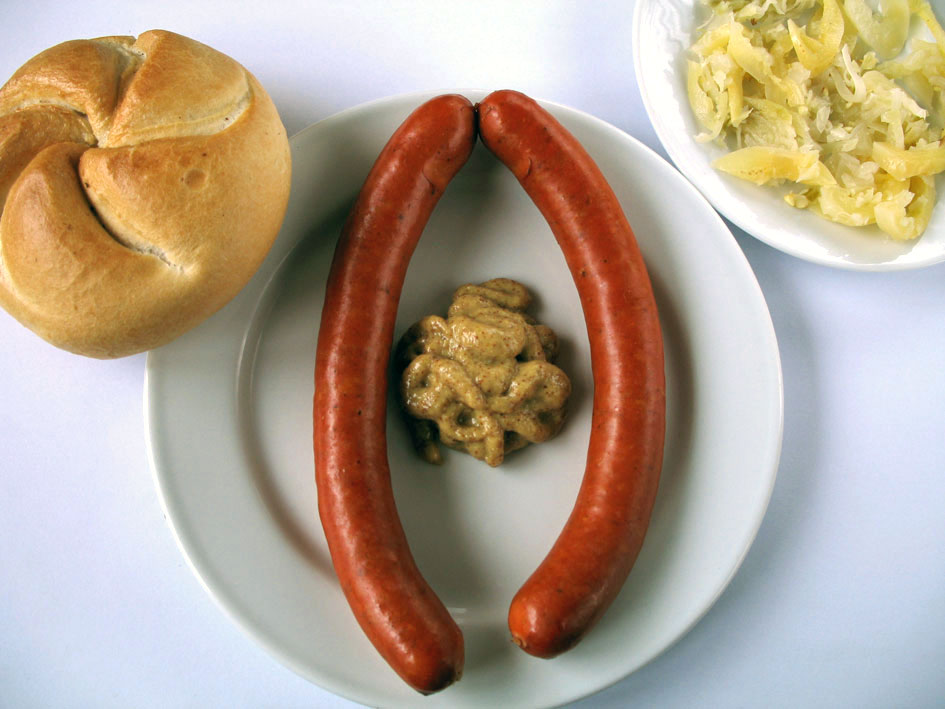
Debrecener sausages in a plate

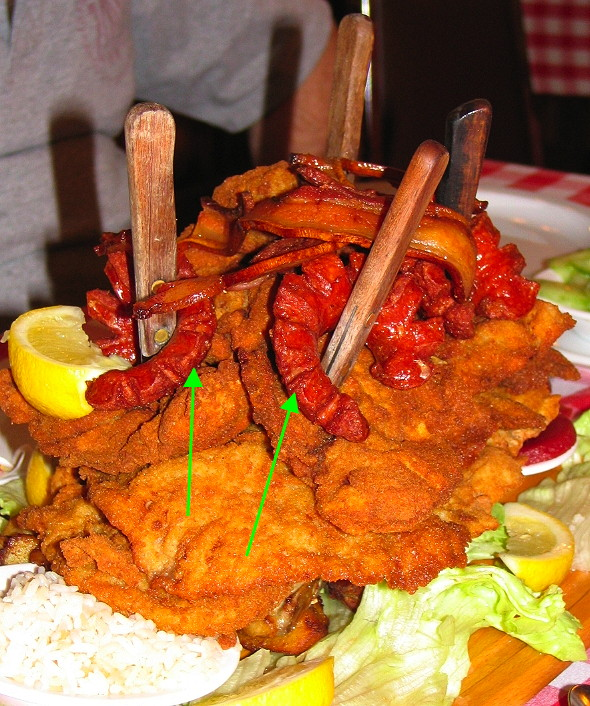
Debreceni (indicated by green arrows) atop a wood platter (festival of meat) at a Hungarian restaurant

A debrecener (Hungarian: debreceni virsli, German: Debre(c)ziner, Italian: Salsiccia di Debrecen) is a pork sausage of uniform fine texture and reddish-orange colour, named after the Hungarian city of Debrecen. The sausages are heavily spiced with paprika and other seasonings, like garlic, pepper and marjoram. Usually they contain tiny pieces of pork fat as well. They are usually unsmoked or lightly smoked, and sold in pairs joined at one end. Traditional cooking technique calls for the Debreceni to be transversely slashed at intervals and baked, broiled, or fried. The sausage tends to curl away from the slashes, creating a linked series of sausage coins.

Although originating in Eastern Hungary, this sausage spread to and has become popular in virtually every part of the former Austro-Hungarian Empire (including Austria, Northern Italy, Croatia, Slovenia, Poland, the Czech Republic, Slovakia, Western and Central Romania and Western Ukraine) and adopted into those cuisines. In Poland, it is called "Debreczyńska". In Bulgaria a derivative sausage is called debartsini (Bulgarian: дебърцини) and is widely offered by mass charcuterie.

== See also ==
- List of sausages
- List of smoked foods
