= Sausage casing =

Material used in sausage-making

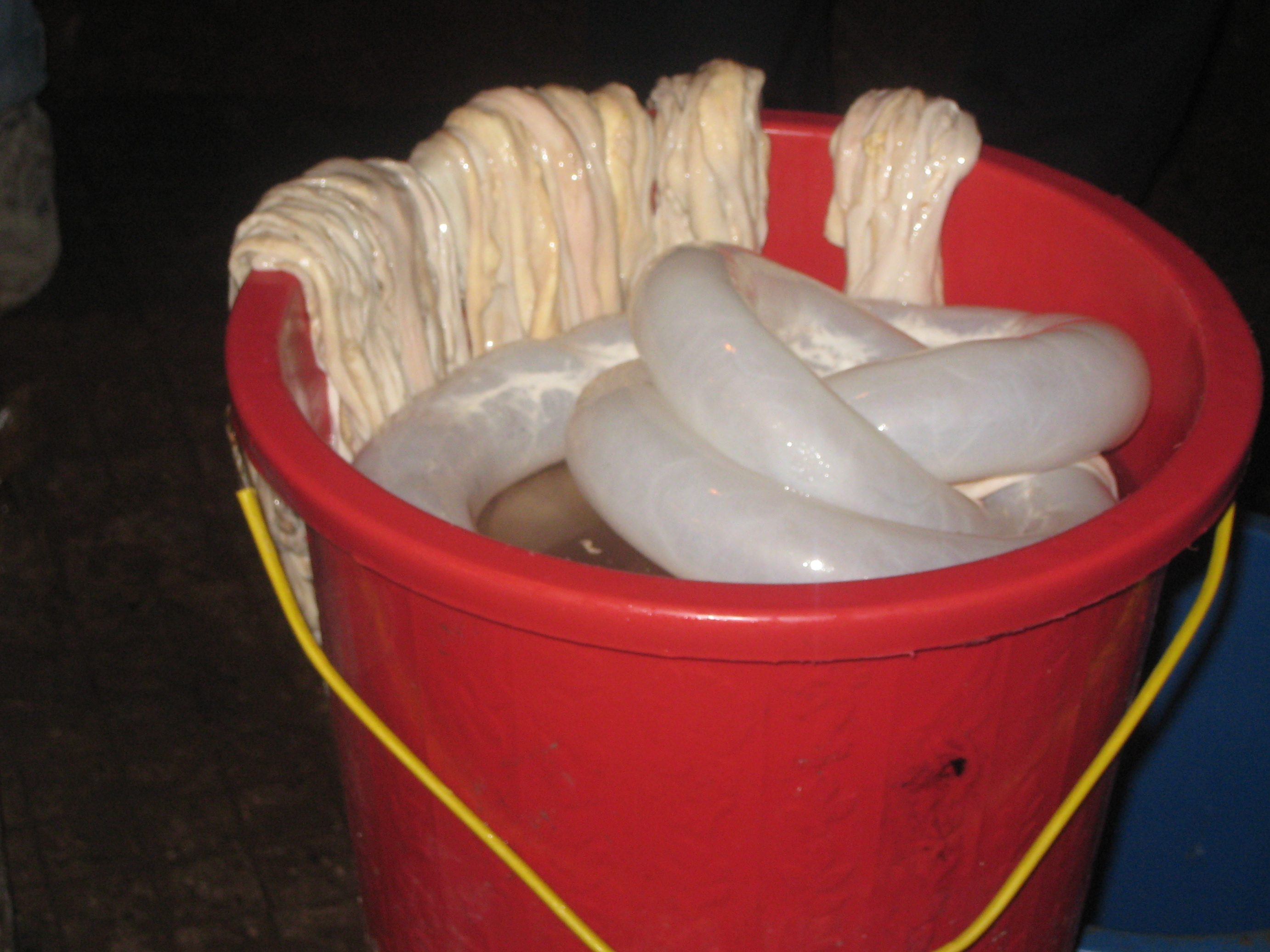
Casing from beef (in bucket) and sheep (on rear edge of bucket)

Sausage casing, also known as sausage skin or simply casing, is the material that encloses the filling of a sausage. Natural casings are made from animal intestines or skin; artificial casings, introduced in the early 20th century, are made of collagen and cellulose. The material is then shaped via a continuous extrusion process—producing a single sausage casing of indefinite length—which is then cut into desired lengths, usually while the extrusion process continues.

== Natural casings ==
=== Origin ===
Natural sausage casings are made from the sub-mucosa of the small intestine of meat animals, a layer of the intestine that consists mainly of naturally occurring collagen. In Western European cuisine and Chinese cuisine, most casings come from pigs, but elsewhere the intestines of sheep, goats, cattle and sometimes horses are also used. To prepare the intestines as casings, they are flushed, scraped and cleaned with water and salt by hand or with machinery; today they are primarily machine-cleaned. The outer fat and the inner mucosa lining are removed during processing. They are salted to lower the water activity (which inhibits microbial growth) and preserve the casing. Natural casings have been used in the production of meat specialties for centuries and have remained virtually unchanged in function, appearance, and composition. US and EU organic food regulations only allow natural casings, which can be derived from non-organically raised animals as there are no large-scale slaughter plants which handle and process only organic animals and sell their casings as certified organic casings. As a result, all large-scale natural casing companies buy casings from around the world and send them on to be graded and packaged. There are four primary animal genera which are used to manufacture natural casings (although all mammals raised for meat could potentially be used to produce natural casing): cows, pigs, lamb and sheep.

=== Appearance ===
Natural sausage casings are distinguishable from collagen or cellulose casings because of their irregularity, although high-quality sheep and lamb casings can be almost indistinguishable from a collagen casing as they have no noticeable imperfections. The main difference is in the way they are twisted and linked which affects the appearance of the final product and makes it easy to differentiate a hot dog using natural sheep or lamb casing vs collagen casing. The size and usage of natural casings relate to the animal from which they are derived, the narrowest being lamb followed by sheep followed by pig followed by beef. The size range for lamb is 14 mm to 28 mm in diameter (which is how casings are graded), the size range for sheep is 16 mm to 32 mm in diameter, the size range for pig is 28 mm to 58 mm in diameter, the size range for beef is 43 mm to 65 mm, although beef bung caps (which are not derived from the small intestine) have a size range of 115 mm to 130 mm.

=== Processing ===
The process begins at the slaughter plant where "green" (uncleaned) runners (ungraded casings) are removed from the animal during the slaughter process. They are subsequently cleaned, which involves breaking the inner mucosa, usually with a machine that the runners go through and rollers to break the inner mucosa so it can be flushed out and removed. The cleaning process can be done by hand, but primarily casings are machine cleaned. This is a very water-intensive process as the casings are vigorously flushed with cold water to remove blood from the mucosa which if not properly flushed during the initial processing can lead to "staining" of the casing where it becomes pink. The cleaned runners are then tied in bundles and packed in plastic drums and filled with a saturated salt brine for preservation. The runners are then sold to a company which processes natural casings by grading and packaging them to create finished units called hanks.

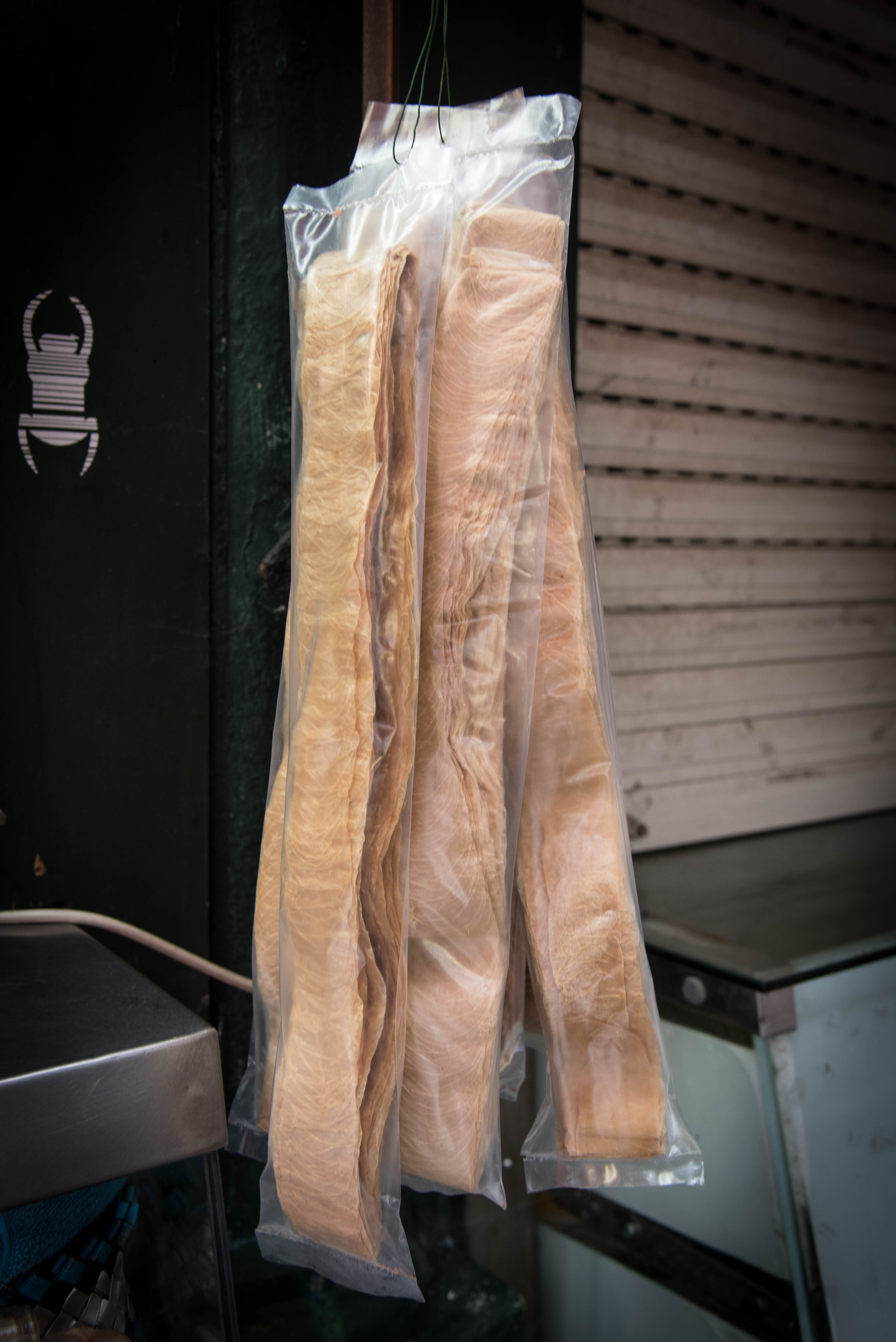
Sausage casings

Natural casings are produced and sold almost exclusively by the hank which is a unit of measure that is 91 meters long. A hank can consist of a varying number of strands (individual pieces of casing) which vary in length from 2 meters (which is the shortest length sold for commercial use) to as long as 28 meters. Each casing manufacturer has various "put ups" which dictate the maximum number of strands and the minimum length of each strand allowed in the put up. Casings are selected for size which is measured in millimeters and refers to the diameter of the casing; this is done exclusively by hand and is primarily done in China due to the availability of low cost labor. Commercially casings are available in various forms of packaging which are suited to different applications. Sheep/lamb and hog are available in all packaging types due to the high demand and long length of pieces; due to the shorter length and much lower demand for beef casings they are primarily only available loose or in net packs either salted or in brine.

=== Packaging ===
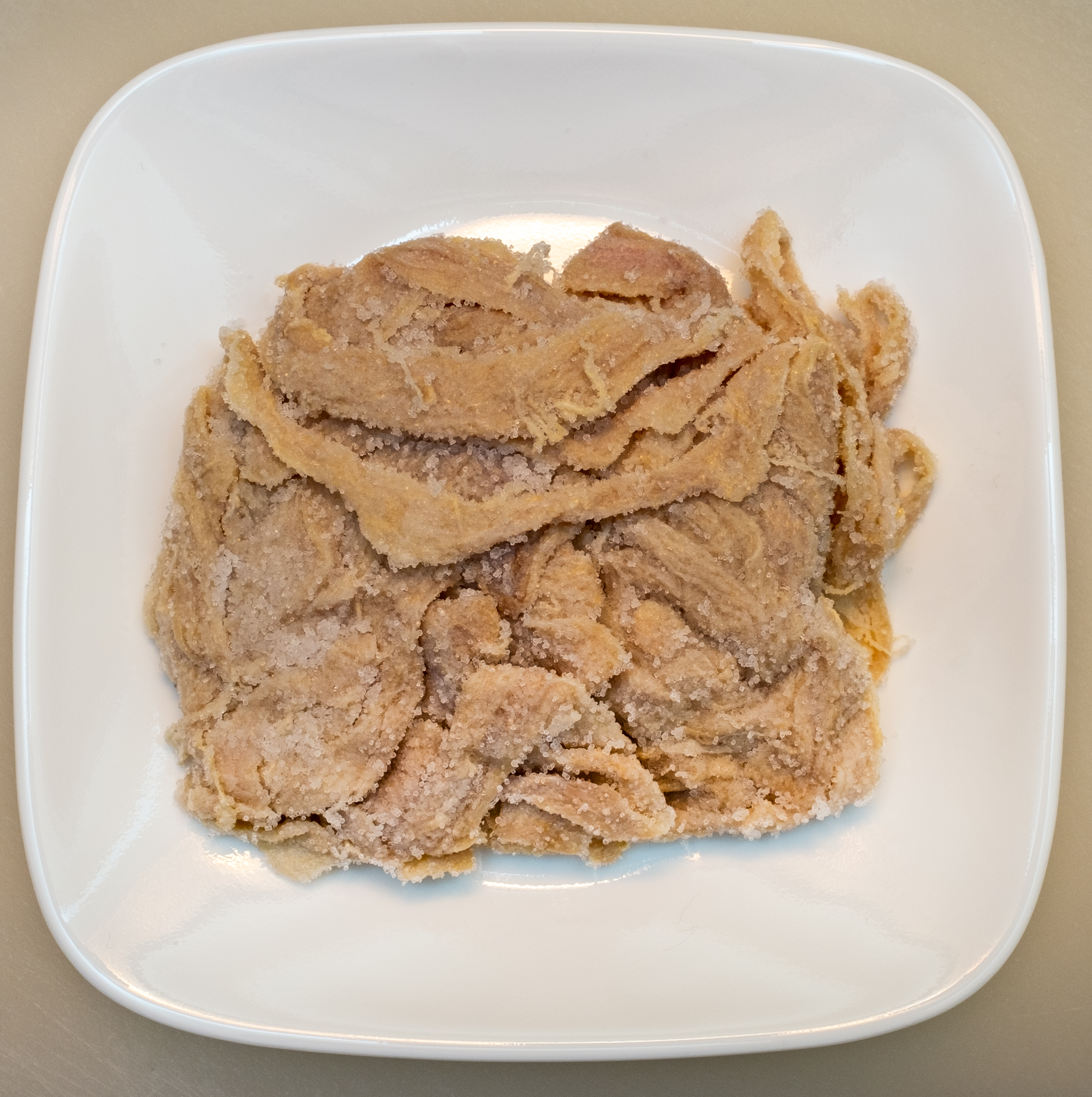
Hog casings, packed in salt, from a vacuum pack

Sheep, lamb and hog casings are available "tubed" where each strand is put on a plastic tube which allows the sausage maker to easily place the casing on the stuffing horn; in recent years these tubes have been modified so they break open along a seam and the operator can pull them out at the back of the horn allowing greater efficiency; these are referred to in the industry as "zip tubes", due to the zipper-like nature of the seam. These tubed casings are then packed in plastic nets, usually two per net, and packed in plastic drums, which are then filled with a saturated salt brine, usually 200 per drum. These are available in all diameters and in lengths greater than 3 meters (as 2-meter or shorter pieces are cost prohibitive to tube).

Sheep, lamb, and hog casings are also available loose in brine in a vacuum sealed plastic pack; commonly referred to as "vacuum packs", these are primarily used by small- to medium-sized sausage makers who use less than 100 hanks per month of casing. The appeal of vacuum packs is the ease of use, their shorter strand length for hand stuffing (all sausage makers who do not use automatic sausage stuffing and linking machines) and their shelf life; they only need to be opened as needed so the sausage maker does not need to worry that they will not use their opened casings prior to a decrease in quality. These are available in all diameters and in put ups from short up to medium length, about 6 meter minimum, with a maximum length of about 14 meters.

Sheep, lamb and hog casings are also available in a net, commonly referred to as net pack. These are available salted or in brine and they are primarily used by medium to large sausage makers who do not want to pay the additional cost for the tubed casing and do not have automatic sausage stuffing and linking machines (which require tubed casings to operate efficiently). These are available in all diameters and in lengths greater than 2 meters.

Beef casings are primarily available only salted or in brine. They are measured in sets, not hanks, and the length is 32 meters; this is for beef "rounds" and "middles" only, as beef bung caps are only about 1 meter in length.

== Artificial casings ==
Artificial casings are made of collagen (often derived from cattle skin), cellulose, or plastic. Artificial casings from animal collagen are generally edible, though some are not.

=== Collagen casings ===
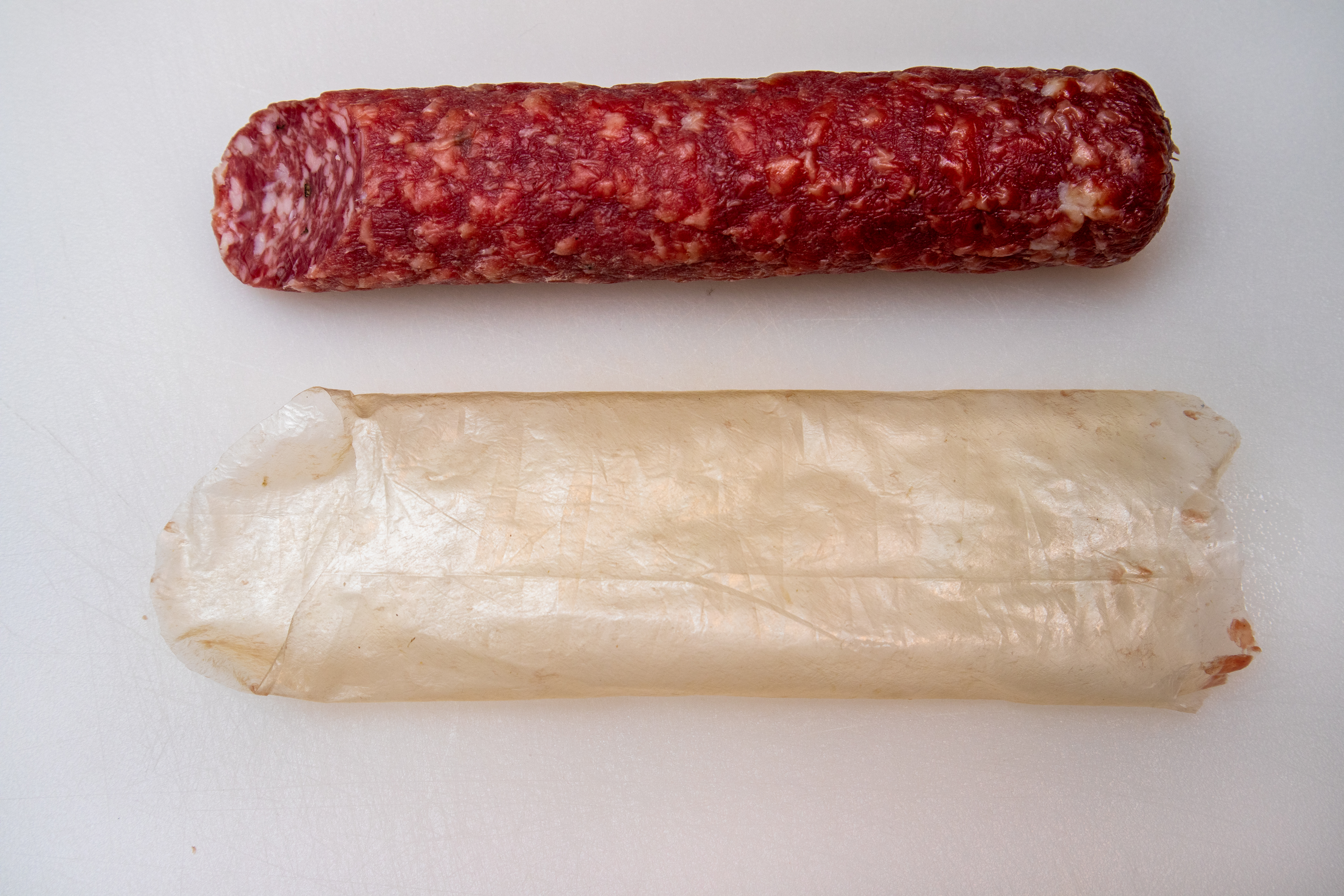
A salami and the collagen casing (below) it came in

Collagen casings are mainly produced from the collagen in beef or pig hides, and the bones and tendons. It can also be derived from poultry and fish. They have been made for more than 50 years and their share of the market has been increasing. Usually the cost to produce sausages in collagen is significantly lower than making sausages in gut because of higher production speeds and lower labor requirements.

The collagen for artificial casings is processed extensively. It is formed by extrusion through a die to the desired diameter, dried and shirred into short sticks up to 41 cm (16 in) long that contain as much as 50 m (160 ft) of casing. In a newer process, a form of dough is coextruded with the meat blend, and a coating is formed by treating the outside with a calcium solution to set the coating.

The latest generation of collagen casings are usually more tender than natural casings and do not exhibit the "snap" or "bite" of natural casing sausages. Most collagen casings are edible, but a special form of thicker collagen casings is used for salamis and large caliber sausages where the casing is usually peeled off the sausage by the consumer. Collagen casings are less expensive to use, give better weight and size control, and are easier to run when compared to natural casings.

=== Vegetarian casings ===
Some innovative coextrusion processes have been developed in recent years, allowing 100% plant-based vegetarian casings to be created. Some special alginate coextrusion equipment is required to make casings that can be used in halal or kosher food making.

== Inedible casings ==
Casings made from cellulose and plastics are peeled off food products and are not eaten.

=== Cellulose casings ===
Cellulose, usually from cotton linters or wood pulp, is processed to make viscose, which is then extruded into clear, tough casings for making wieners and franks. They also are shirred for easier use and can be treated with dye to make "red hots". The casing is peeled off after cooking, resulting in "skinless" franks. Cellulosic viscose solutions are combined with wood or for example abacá pulp to make large diameter fibrous casings for bologna, cotto salami, smoked ham and other products sliced for sandwiches. This type is also permeable to smoke and water vapor. They can be flat or shirred, depending on application, and can be pretreated with smoke, caramel color, or other surface treatments.

=== Plastic casings ===
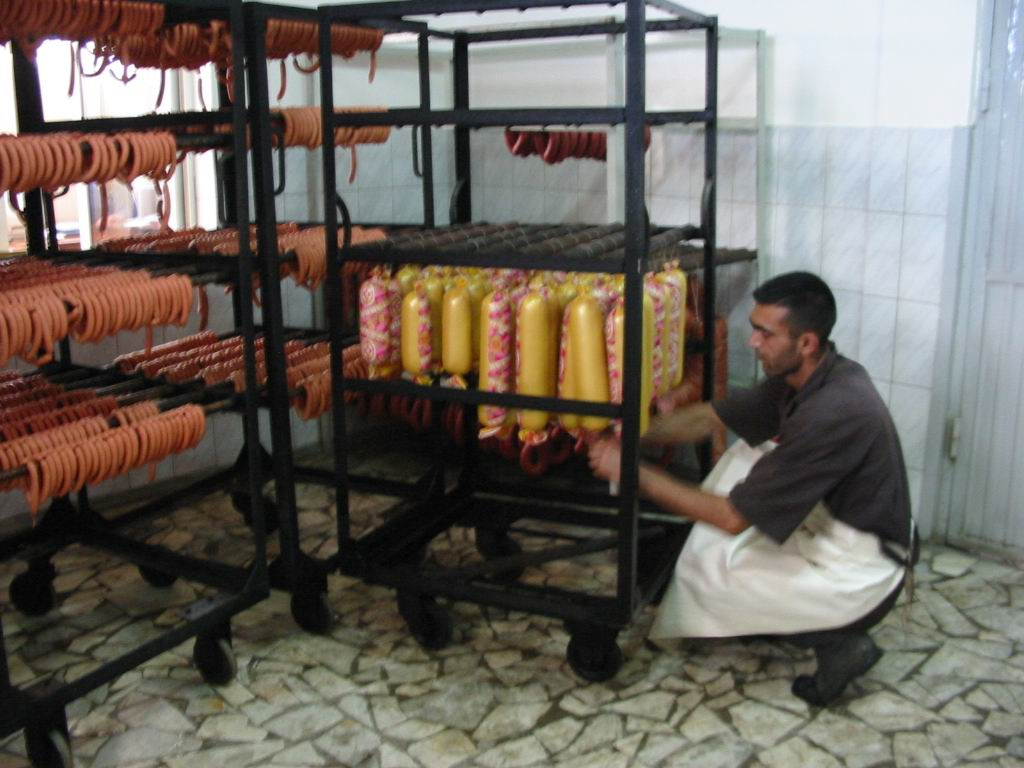
Plastic casings in use at Bilyan Factory, Armenia (2007)

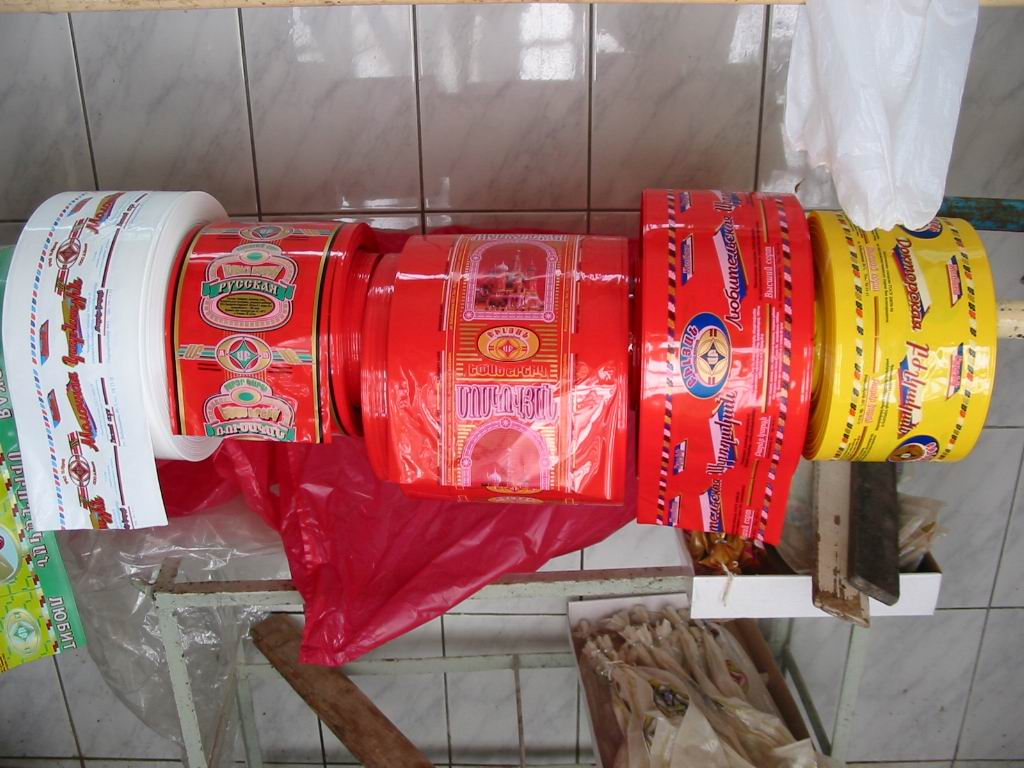
Bilyan Factory

Plastic casings are not eaten. They also can be flat or shirred. Generally, smoke and water cannot pass through the casing, so plastic is used for non-smoked products where high yields are expected. The inner surface can be laminated or co-extruded with a polymer with an affinity for meat protein causing the meat to stick to the film, resulting in some loss when the casing is peeled, but higher overall yield due to better moisture control.

Plastic casings are generally made from polymers such as polyamide, polypropylene, or polyethylene. Polyamide (Nylon) plastic casings are the most commonly used in production of cooked sausages and hams such as luncheon meat and bologna. Polyamide casings come in two main varieties: Oriented and non-oriented. The oriented polyamide are shrinkable casings and will shrink during the cooking process thereby reducing the water loss. Non-oriented polyamide casings remain the same diameter during the cooking process and thereby allow for expansion of the meat during cooking. The use of polyamide casings has expanded recently with the advent of various varieties and structures of casings such as multilayer casings.
