= Almapaprika =

Hungarian sweet pepper

The almapaprika (English: Apple pepper; Capsicum annuum L. convar. Longum) is a variety of sweet pepper (Capsicum annuum var. grossum) and an integral part of Hungarian gastronomy and pickling culture, commonly enjoyed in preserved form or as part of various traditional dishes.

== Origin of the name ==
Its name comes from the fact that its fruit resembles an apple.

== Characteristics ==
Its fruit is 6–8 cm tall, thick-fleshed, and has a mildly spicy flavor (500–1000 SHU).

It produces fruit from mid-to-late summer and early autumn.

It is an indeterminate plant with flattened, spherical berries that ripen from yellowish-white to red. Its fruits are suitable for fresh consumption, pickling, and industrial processing.
