= Gombovtsi =

Ukrainian dessert

Gombovtsi (Ukrainian: гомбовці, also ґомбовці) is a traditional dessert associated with the Transcarpathian region of Ukraine. It consists of dough-based dumplings that may be filled or unfilled, and are typically prepared by boiling or steaming. The dish is part of the culinary traditions of the Carpathian region.

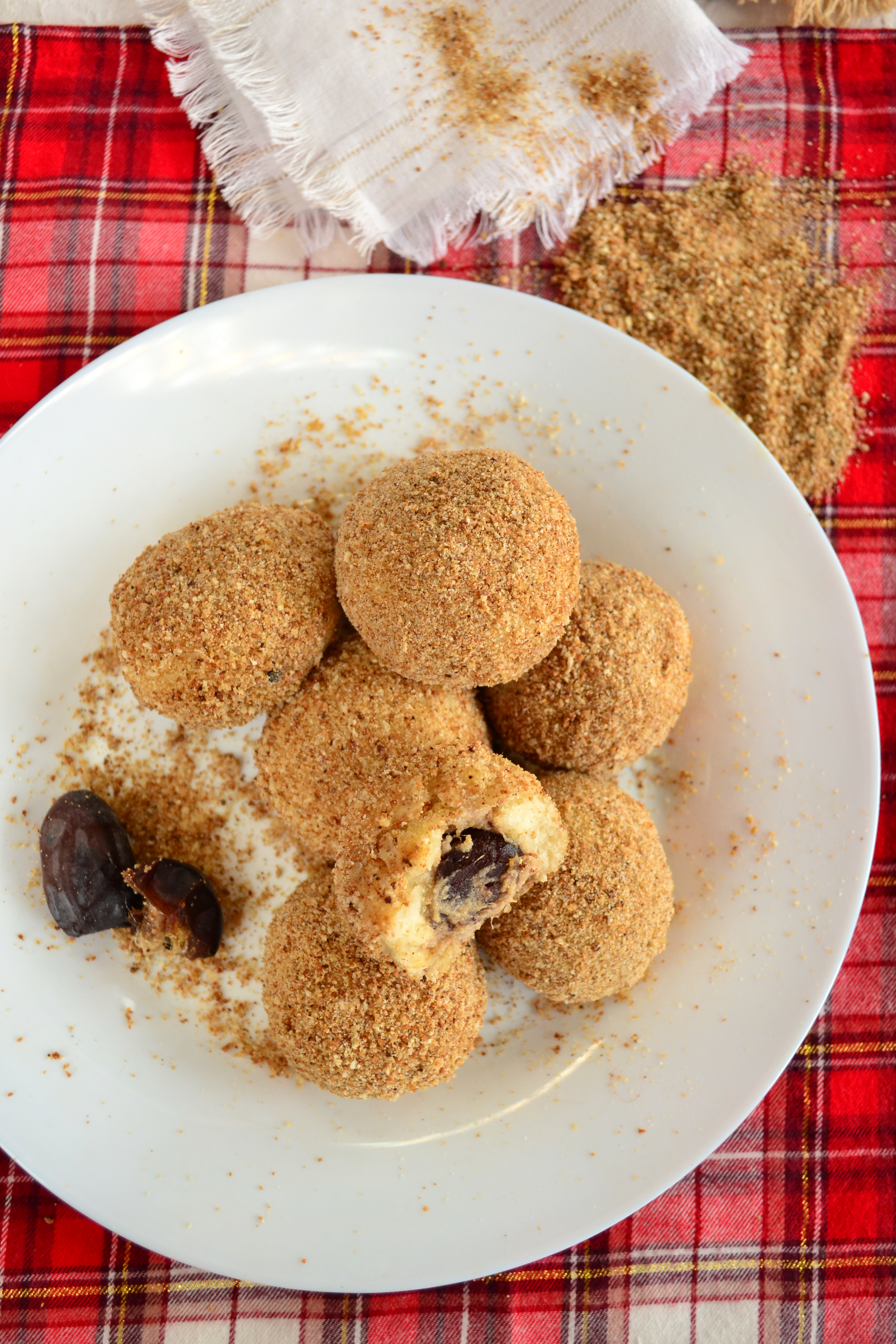
Gombovtsi -Transcarpathian dumplings

== Etymology ==
The name gombovtsi is derived from the Hungarian word gombóc, meaning “dumpling” or “ball”, reflecting historical linguistic and culinary influences in the Transcarpathian region.

== Description ==
Gombovtsi are prepared from dough based on flour, potatoes, or cottage cheese. They may be filled with fruit, jam, berries, or prepared without filling.

After cooking, they are commonly served with toppings such as melted butter, sour cream, sugar, or toasted breadcrumbs.

The dish is typically prepared by boiling or steaming.

== Variants ==
Several regional variants of gombovtsi exist in Transcarpathian cuisine:

- Cottage cheese gombovtsi - prepared using cottage cheese combined with eggs and flour or semolina, often served with sweet breadcrumb toppings.
- Potato gombovtsi - made from a potato-based dough and considered closer to Hungarian dumpling traditions.
- Fruit-filled gombovtsi - dumplings filled with plums, berries, or jam before cooking.

== Cultural context ==
Gombovtsi are part of the culinary heritage of Transcarpathia, a region influenced by Ukrainian, Hungarian, and other Central European culinary traditions. The dish is sometimes compared to other regional dumpling dishes due to similarities in preparation and structure.

== See also ==
- Ukrainian cuisine
- Hungarian cuisine
