= Savanyúság =

Pickled side dish in Hungarian cuisine

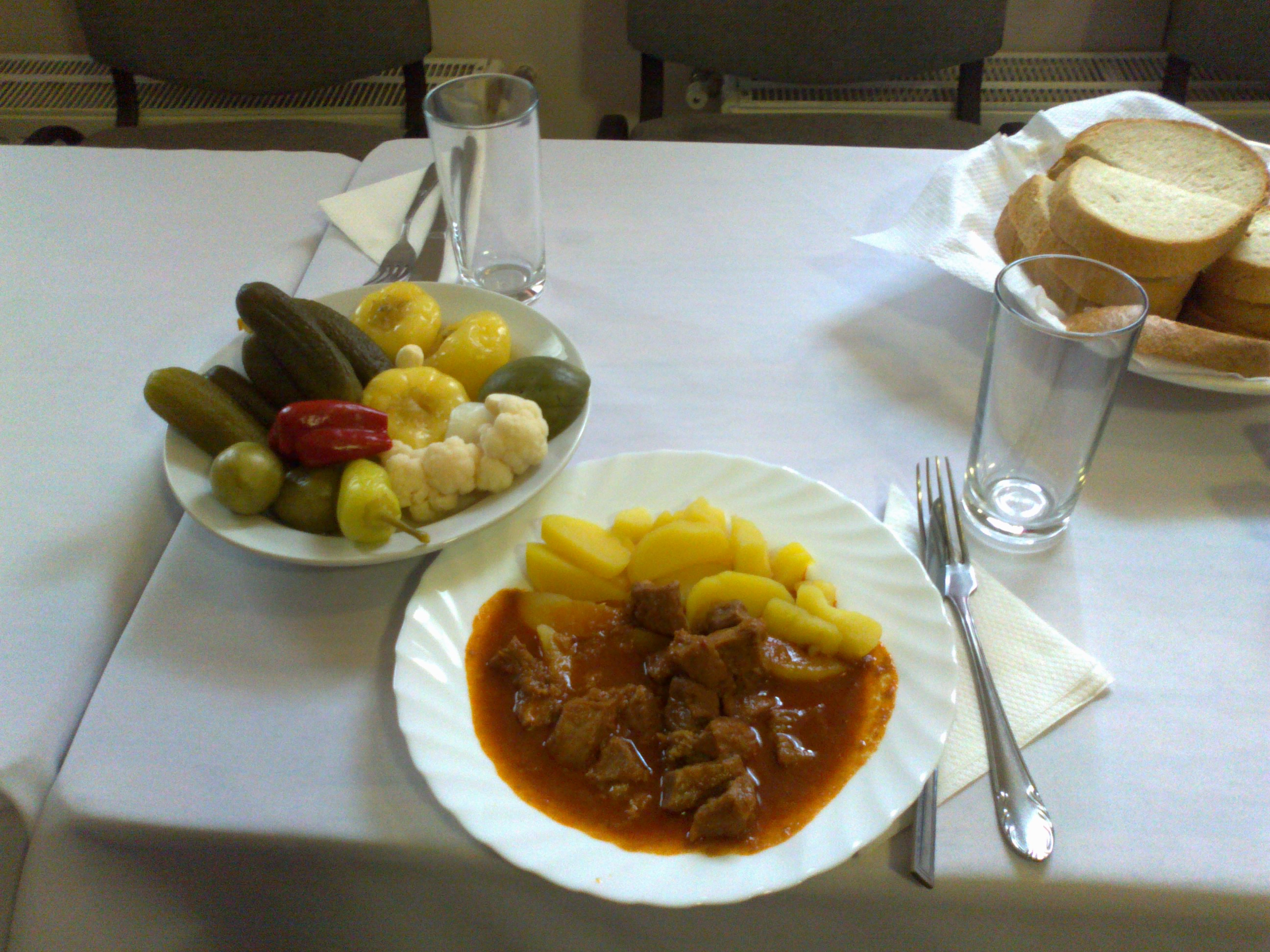
Pörkölt with savanyúság in a small bowl

Savanyúság (Hungarian pronunciation: [ˈʃɒvɒɲuːʃaːɡ]) are small side dishes of pickled vegetables or fruits in Hungarian cuisine, commonly accompanying the main dish. When it is cut up to small pieces, it is called csalamádé.

Savanyúság can consist of watermelon slices, red peppers, bell peppers, cucumbers, leeks, red cabbage, cauliflowers, carrots, green tomatoes, sauerkraut (savanyú káposzta), beetroots, or TV pepper (abbreviation of töltésre való, meaning 'meant for stuffing'; e.g. making töltött paprika, but jam is also made out of it). It is usually served soaked in vinegar.

It appears in Zsigmond Móricz's Dinner as something the main course can't be lacking.

== See also ==
- Tsukemono
- Encurtido
- List of Pickled foods
