= Rakott krumpli =

Hungarian potato casserole

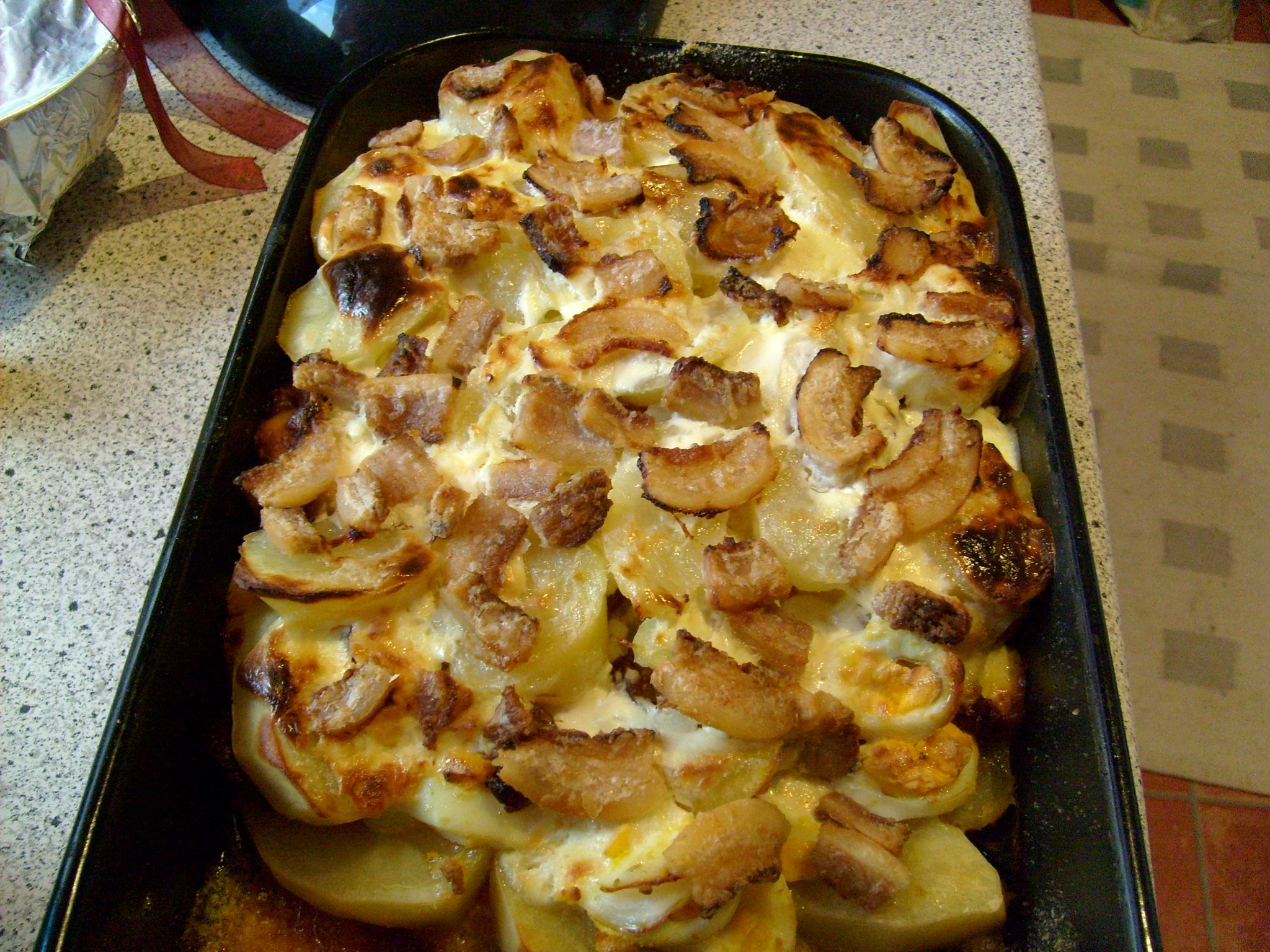
Rakott krumpli

Rakott krumpli (or rarely rakott burgonya) is a Hungarian dish made from potatoes, sour cream, smoked sausage, and hard-boiled eggs. It is a layered casserole with slices of each ingredient layered onto each other, first mentioned by István Czifray in his 1840 edition of the Magyar nemzeti szakácskönyv ("Hungarian National Cookbook"). It can be served as a luncheon dish, as a main course or as a side dish.

== See also ==
- Hungarian cuisine
- List of casserole dishes
- List of potato dishes
