= Hungarian cuisine =

Culinary tradition

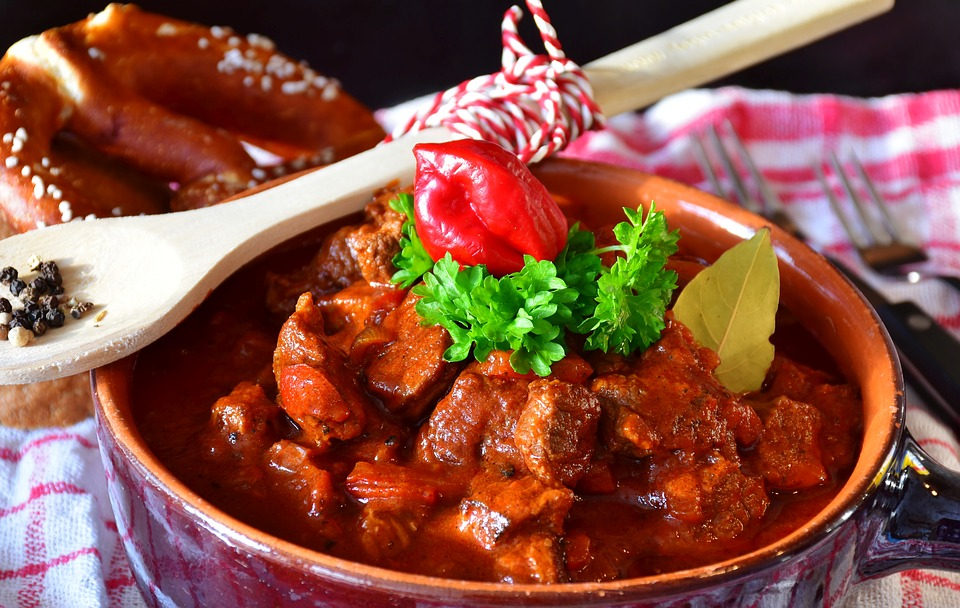
Pörkölt

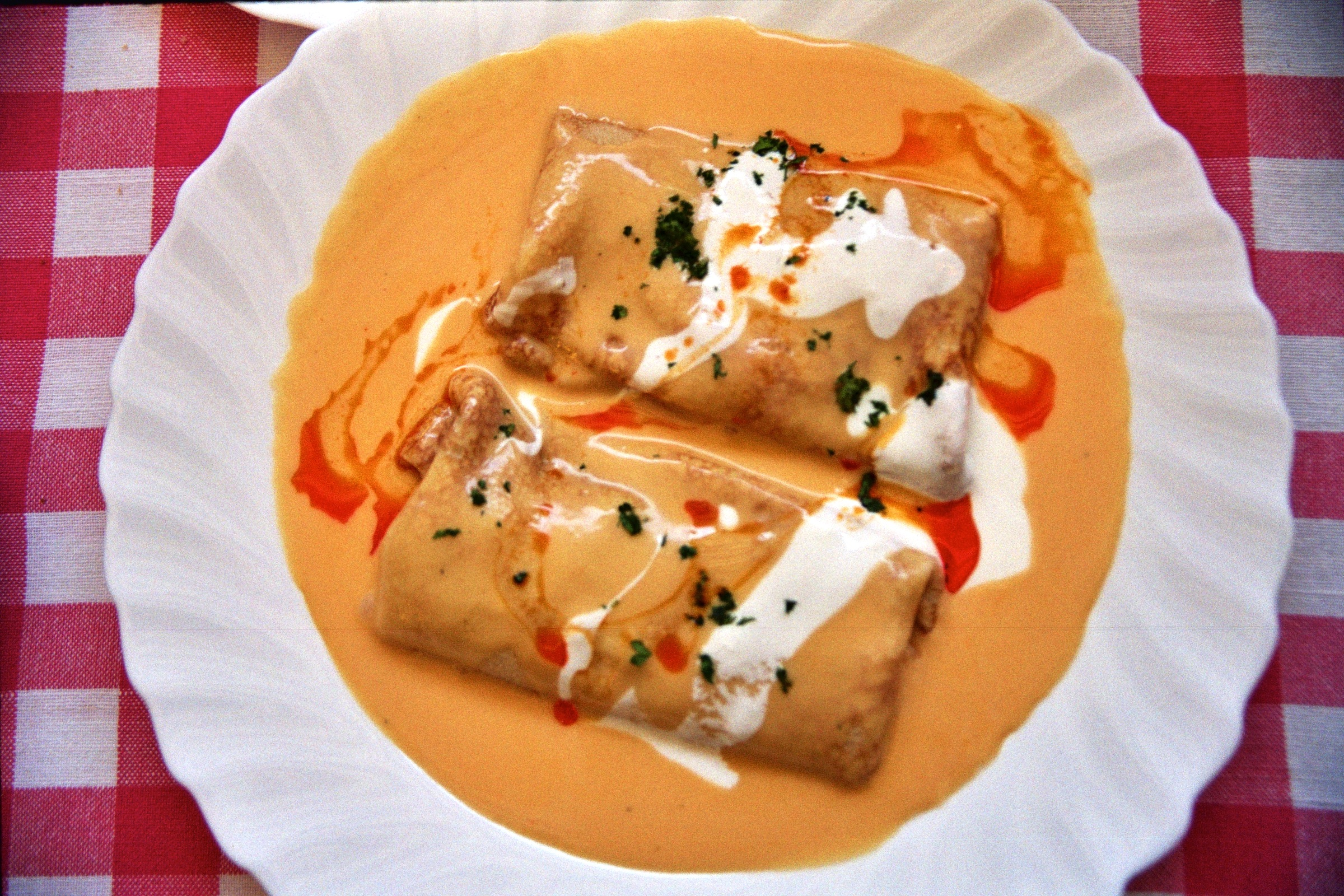
Hortobágyi palacsinta, a savoury crêpe filled with meat

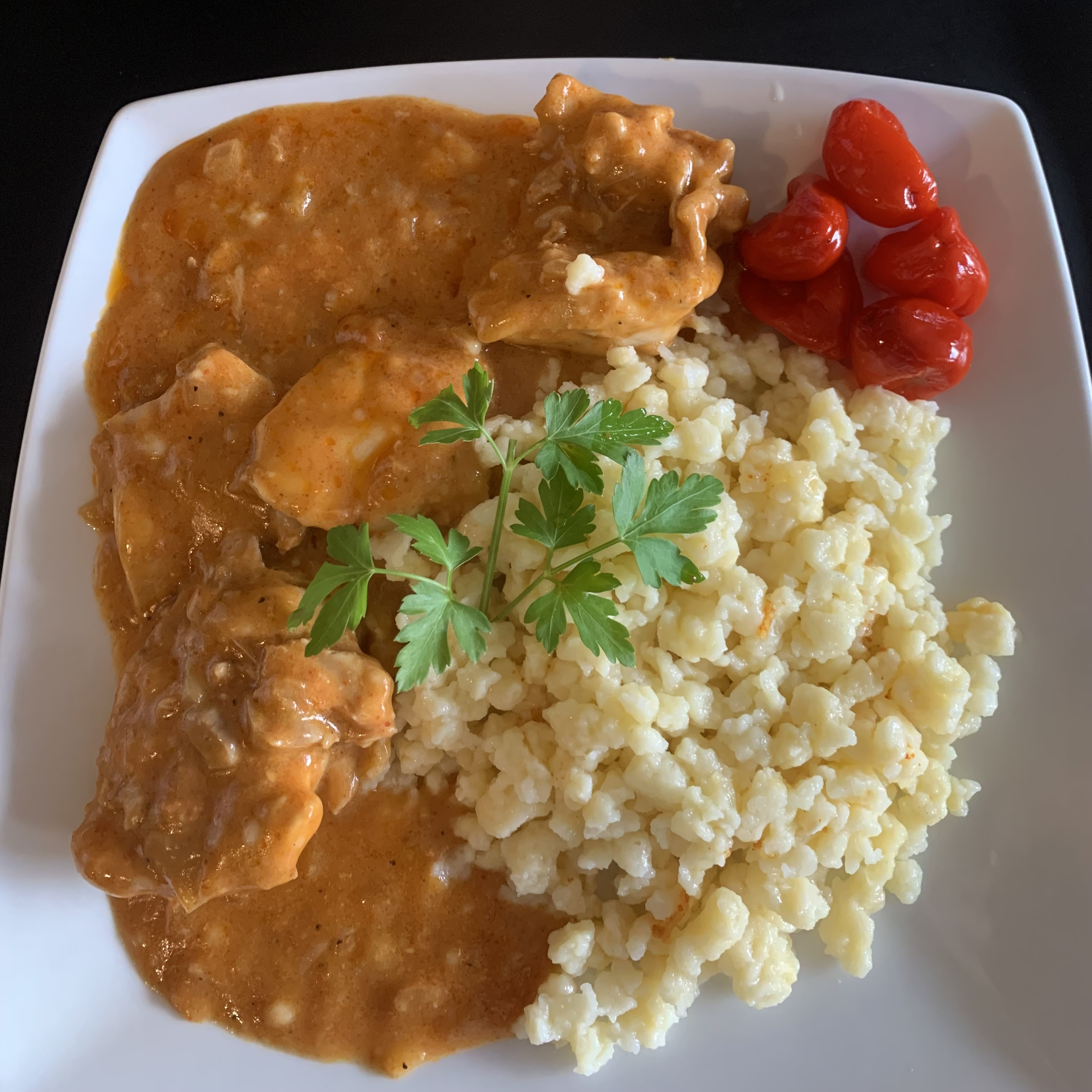
Chicken paprikash (csirkepaprikás) simmered in thick creamy paprika sauce with homemade pasta called nokedli

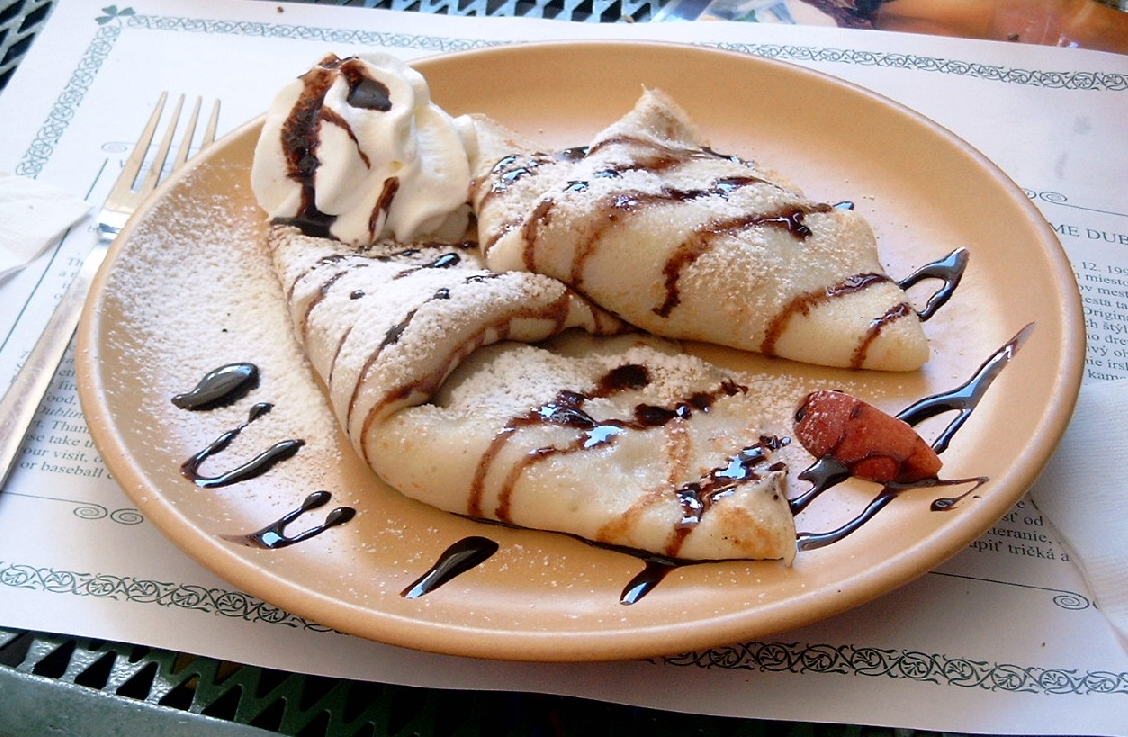
Gundel palacsinta filled with nuts and chocolate sauce

Hungarian cuisine (Hungarian: magyar konyhaművészet) is the cuisine characteristic of the nation of Hungary, and its primary ethnic group, Hungarians. Hungarian cuisine has been described as being the spiciest cuisine in Europe. This can largely be attributed to the use of their piquant native spice, Hungarian paprika, in many of their dishes. A mild version of the spice, Hungarian sweet paprika, is commonly used as an alternative. Traditional Hungarian dishes are primarily based on meats, seasonal vegetables, fruits, bread, and dairy products.

== General features ==
Paprika is often associated with Hungary and is used prominently in several dishes. Traditional Hungarian paprika is characterised by its bright colour and distinct heat, differentiating it from milder variations of paprika popular elsewhere in the world. Other herbs and spices commonly used in savoury dishes include garlic, marjoram, tarragon, caraway seeds, celery seeds and dill seeds. Whilst unique, Hungarian cuisine shares similarities with the culinary traditions of its neighbouring countries. Typical Hungarian food is heavy on dairy and meats, similar to those of Czech and Slovak cuisines. Staple ingredients in Hungarian cuisine such as quark, poppy seeds and soured cream, along with dishes like stuffed cabbage, stuffed peppers, bean soup, cornmeal porridge and mixed grilled meat (fatányéros in Hungary), are also present in Romanian, Serbian, and Croatian cuisines. Chicken, pork and beef are common, while turkey, duck, lamb, fish and game meats are mostly eaten on special occasions. Hungary is also known for relatively inexpensive salamis and sausages it produces primarily from pork, but also poultry, beef and others.

Bread is perhaps the most important and basic part of the Hungarian diet. It is eaten at all meals, accompanying main dishes. Before the fall of communism in 1990, white bread was a staple food. Numerous other types of baked goods, such as buns and pastries both salty and sweet, often creatively filled, have proliferated in recent years.

Main dishes may "require" a side dish (köret) or not. It is unusual to violate this convention. The side dish is most commonly potato in various styles, but rice or steamed vegetables are also popular. Some foods have a customary side dish (e.g., csirkepaprikás 'paprika chicken' is almost always eaten with small dumplings similar to gnocchi (nokedli), while others may take any side dish (e.g., rántott sajt 'fried cheese'). Some dishes also have toppings or bread on the side considered almost mandatory, for example, the sour cream and bread with töltött káposzta 'stuffed cabbage'.

Recently, Hungarian chefs have become more creative, so Hungarian dishes prepared for tourists may seem unusual to Hungarians who are familiar with more traditional preparations.

Goulash is a famous Hungarian dish. Other famous Hungarian meat stews include paprikás, a thicker stew with meat simmered in thick, creamy, paprika-flavored gravy, and pörkölt, a stew with boneless meat (usually beef or pork), onion, and sweet paprika powder, both served with galuska or nokedli (small dumplings). Tokány is a traditional dish made of meat and onions fried in fat, seasoned with black pepper and herbs, and stewed in its own juices. It is commonly served with rice, potatoes, tarhonya, or flat noodles (laska). It is akin to kuurdak and similar dishes of other names in and around Central Asia. In some old-fashioned dishes, fruits such as plums and apricots are cooked with meat or in piquant sauces/stuffings for game, roasts and other cuts. Various kinds of noodles, dumplings, potatoes, and rice are commonly served as a side dish. Hungarian dry sausages (kolbász) and winter salami are also widely eaten.

Other characteristics of Hungarian cuisine are the soups, casseroles, desserts, and pastries and stuffed crêpes (palacsinta), with fierce rivalries between regional variations on the same dish (such as the Hungarian hot fish soup called fisherman's soup or halászlé, cooked differently on the banks of Hungary's two main rivers: the Danube and the Tisza), palacsinta (pancakes served flambéed in dark chocolate sauce filled with ground walnuts) and Dobos cake (layered sponge cake, with chocolate buttercream filling and topped with a thin layer of crunchy caramel).

Two elements of Hungarian cuisine that impress foreigners are the various vegetable stews called főzelék as well as cold fruit soups, such as cold sour cherry soup (Hungarian: hideg meggyleves).

Hungarian cuisine includes a variety of cheeses, but the most common are túró (a type of crumbly quark), cream cheeses and juhtúró. Other popular cheeses include Karaván, Pannonia cheese, Pálpusztai, Trappista, and kashkaval.

There are many smoked pork products. Many dishes get their character from the smoky taste of one or more of these ingredients. A variety of Hungarian smoked sausages, smoked ham, and smoked lard are also consumed without further preparation. These are accompanied with bread and fresh vegetables, are often called 'cold dish', and mainly consumed for breakfast or dinner, but sometimes offered as starter in restaurants.

Freshwater fish dishes are very common. In addition to the popular fisherman's soup, frying fish on reeds, making káposzta (csíkos káposzta) or even kolbász out of it also used to be popular.

Pickled (fermented) vegetables are often used. The most common is savanyú káposzta (lit: sour-cabbage, sauerkraut) and soured peppers, gherkins, but a mix of cauliflower, green tomatoes, baby water melon, and other vegetables is also frequent. These are traditionally consumed in the winter and often were the main source of vitamin-C throughout the cold months of winter. Some seasonal, hearty dishes such as töltött káposzta, húsos káposzta and korhelyleves are based on savanyú káposzta. Classic Hungarian restaurants often offer some variations as side dish, a refreshing complement to heavy dishes.

Romani people in Hungary have their own way of cooking of Hungarian dishes. Bodag is a Romani flatbread accompanied by stuffed cabbage and lecsó. In certain regions in Hungary, bodag is referred to as vakáro, vakarcs, or gypsy bread. Romani variations of Hungarian dishes include cigánypecsenye, cigánykáposzta and cigánytúró.

== Seasonings ==
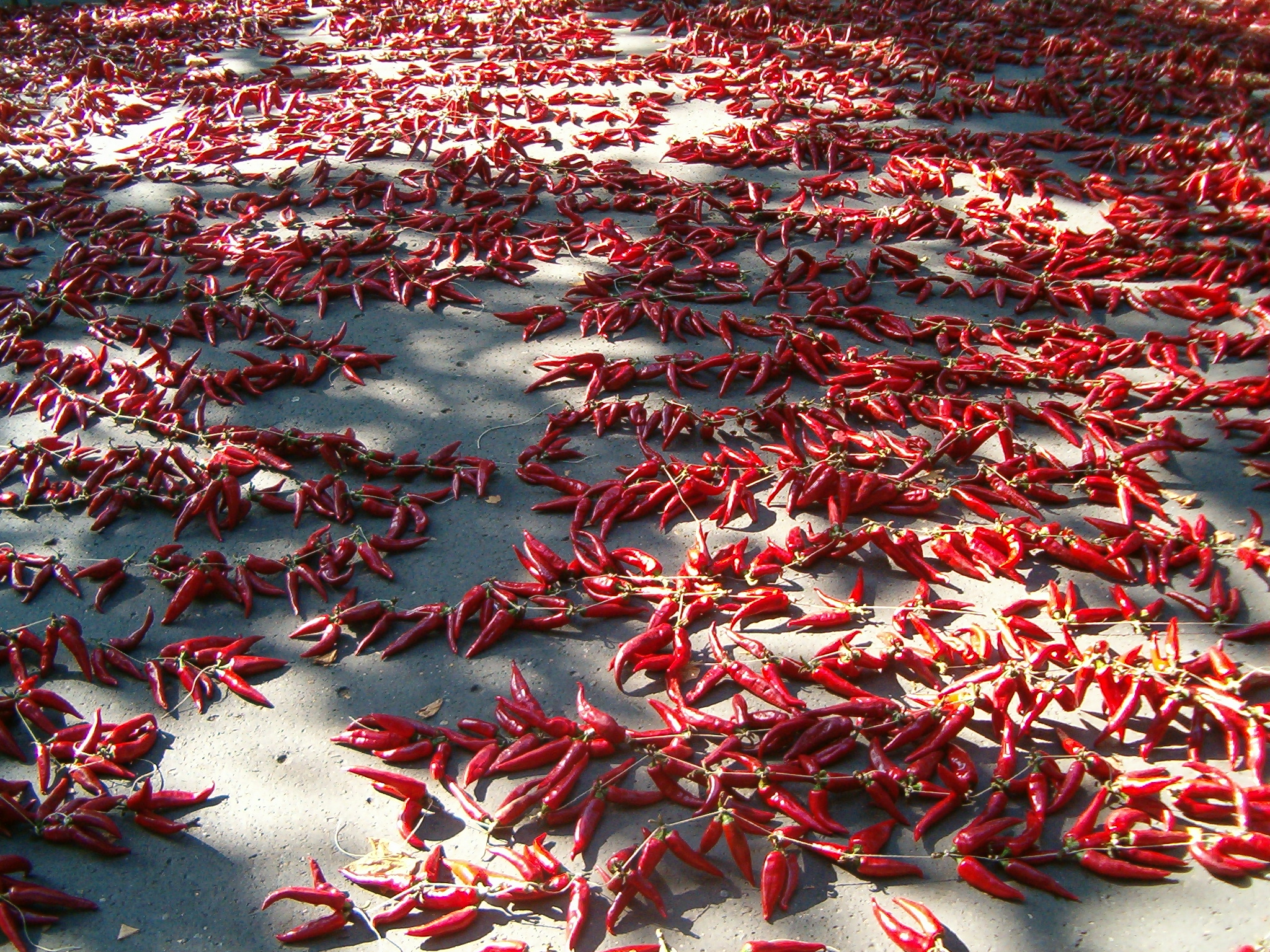
Paprika

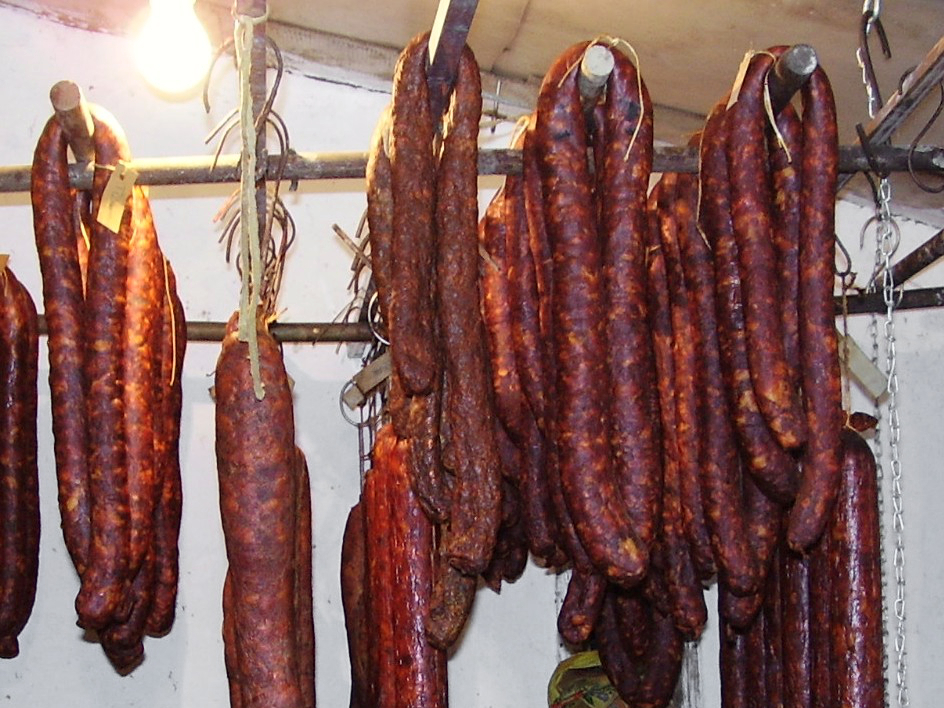
Csaba sausage (csabai kolbász)

Hungarian food uses selected spices judiciously to add flavor, especially paprika, a spice made of ground red pepper.

Paprika being the most important spice, there are many traditional variations and styles ranging from sweet to extremely spicy. The sweet and more mild paprika tend to be more common, but the spicy varieties are still very popular. Hot chilis are also often given as a garnish in traditional Hungarian cuisine, but when not, dried hot chilis or hot chili paste are typically given on the side.

Hungarians are known for loving spicy foods and may also use Piros Arany (a popular Hungarian paprika cream, meaning 'Red Gold') to compliment their meals. They also put the Hungarian chili sauce Erős Pista, in their Fisherman's soup and paprikash.

After paprika, garlic and onion bulbs are some of the most popular aromatics, either or both being used in most every savoury dish.

Herbs are also a key component of Hungarian cuisine, with dill, bay leaf, marjoram, and parsley being the most common. Tarragon, savoury, horseradish, and lovage are also quite common, but less so than the previous. Even herbs such as thyme, patience dock, mint and chives can also be component of some dishes, although considerably less frequently than those mentioned before.

The savoury side of Hungarian cuisine makes use of many spices, most notably paprika. However, Magyar cuisine uses many other spices as well with black pepper, caraway, dill seed, and poppy seed being some of the most common for savoury dishes. Though juniper berries and coriander are also frequently used, but generally only for specific dishes. Mustard seed is uncommon as an ingredient itself, but prepared mustards are used often. Hungarian mustards are often likened to a Dijon-style mustard, though they are not typically made with wine and generally use seeds of the white mustard plant; it is also not uncommon for them to include herbs, particularly tarragon and parsley.

Sweet dishes are typically spiced with different seasonings. Cinnamon, nutmeg, anise, cloves, lemon peel, and vanilla are the most common. Allspice, while traditionally relegated to sweet dishes in western cuisines, is used in both sweet and savoury applications in Hungarian cuisine.

While not really a seasoning, the use of a thick sour cream called tejföl as a topping is another common feature in many dishes.

When products use Hungarian-style as a variation, the flavour is usually pepper, onion or bacon.

== History ==
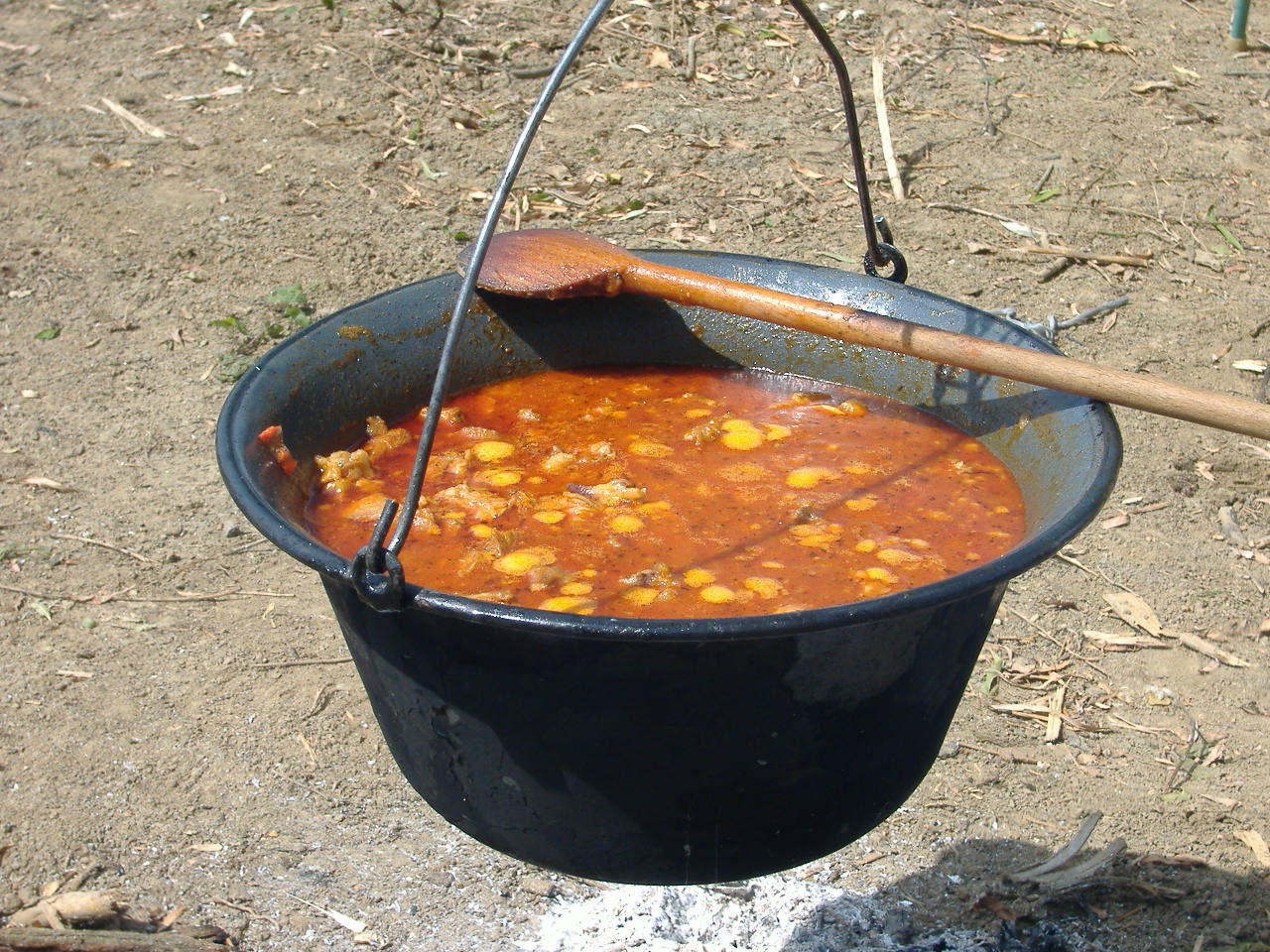
Goulash (gulyásleves) in a traditional cauldron (bogrács)

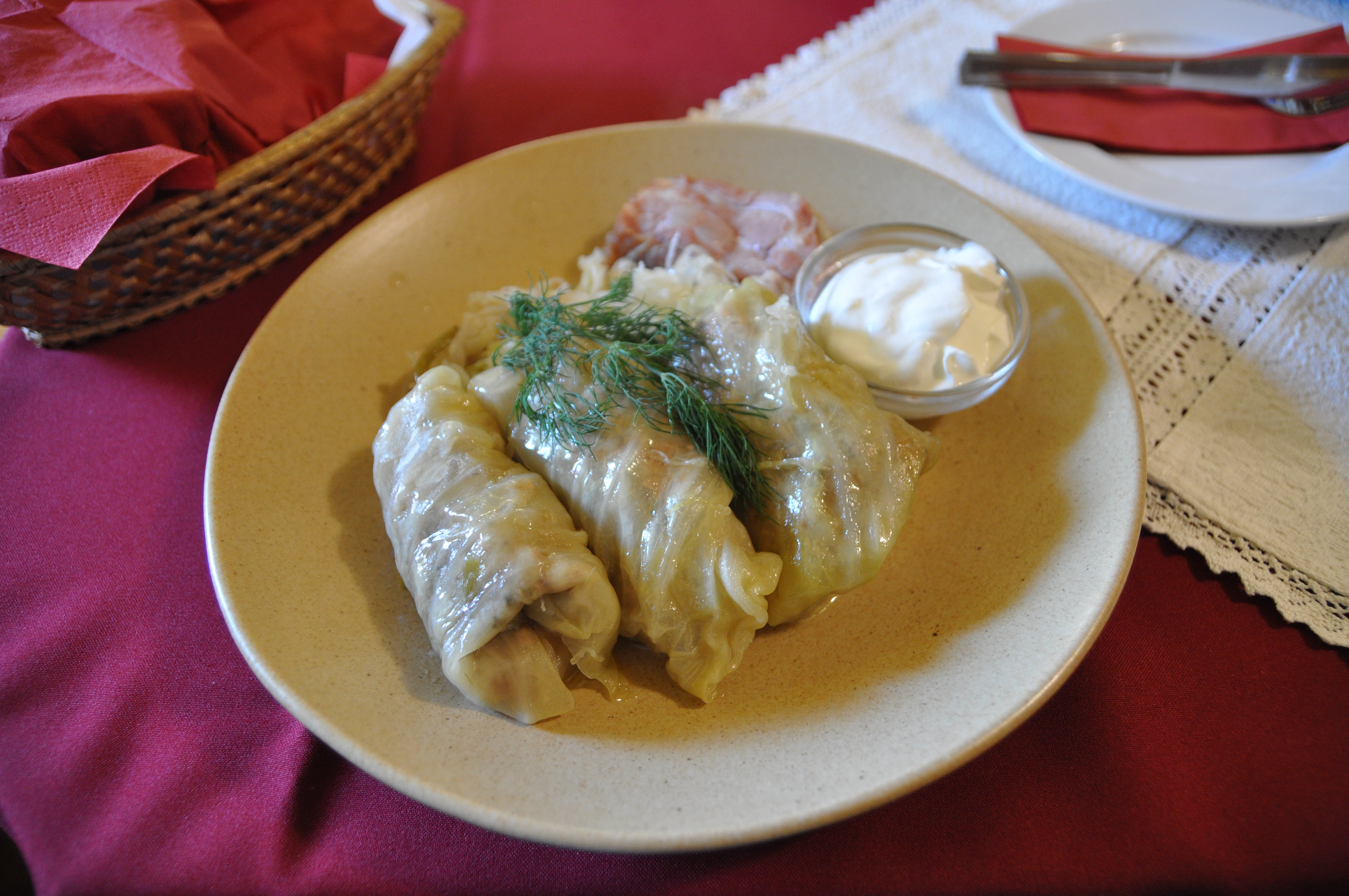
Stuffed cabbage (töltött káposzta or szárma) served with dill, sour cream, and sonka (ham). Töltött káposzta/szárma is frequently also served in a tomato sauce with sauerkraut and kolbász.

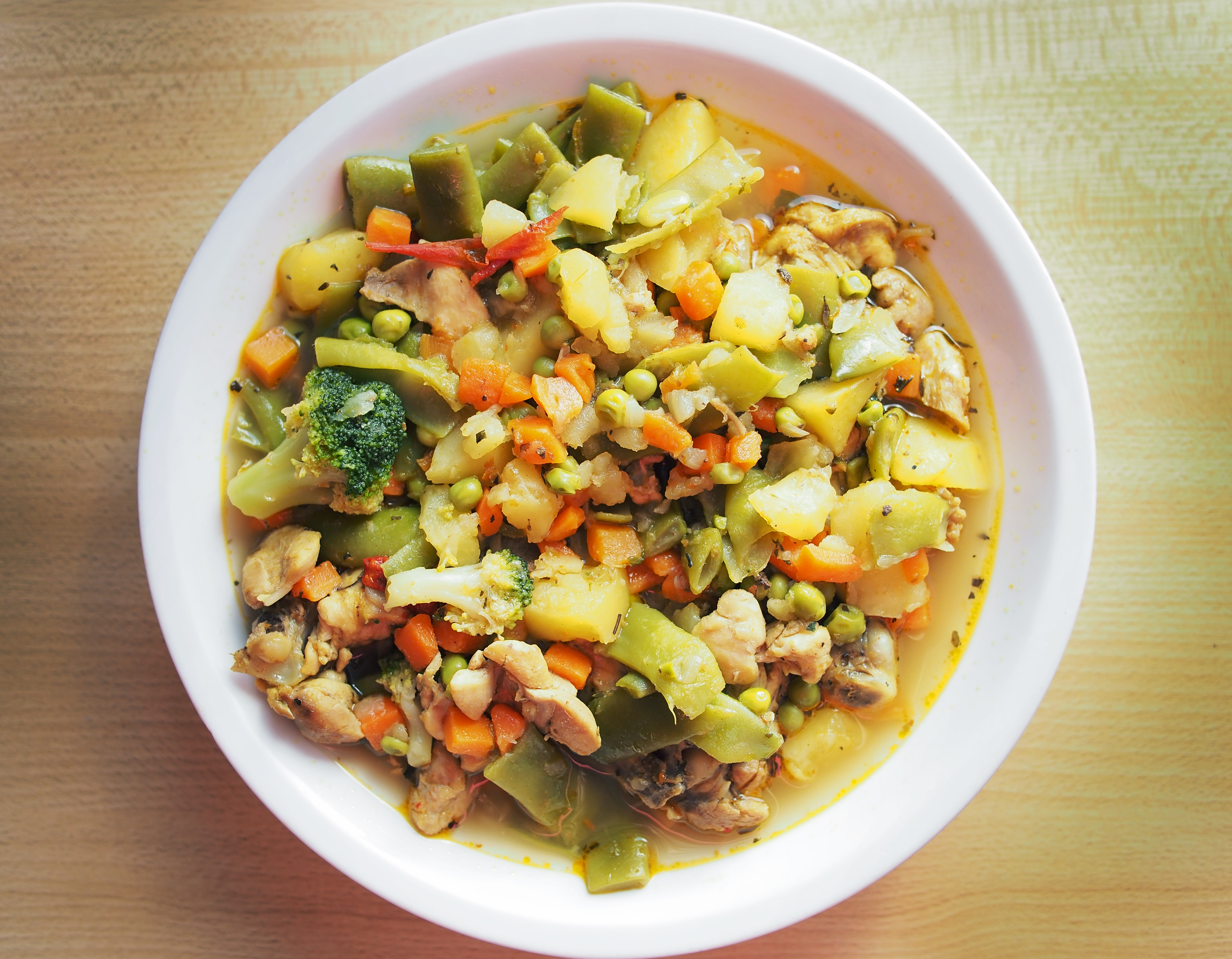
Bográcsétel (dish made in a bogrács)

The historical Hungarian cuisine has been influenced by the history of the Hungarians. The importance of livestock and the nomadic lifestyle of the hungarians, as well as a hearkening to their steppe past, is apparent in the prominence of meat in Hungarian food and may be reflected in traditional meat dishes cooked over the fire like goulash (in Hungarian "gulyás", lit. "cattleman's (meal)"), pörkölt stew and the spicy fisherman's soup called halászlé are all traditionally cooked over the open fire in a bogrács (or cauldron). During the 15th century, new ingredients and spices reached Hungary through Ottoman trade networks, trade across the Black Sea through Transylvania, and trade brought by the marriage between King Matthias Corvinus and Beatrice of Naples. This accelerated following the Ottoman occupation of Buda in 1541, when the Ottomans established a new and abundant trade route to Buda from Constantinople. The spices and ingredients introduced during the 15th and 16th centuries include sweet chestnut, garlic, ginger, mace, saffron and nutmeg, onion, and fruits such as plums, apricots and sour cherries in savoury dishes. Some of these spices such as ginger and saffron are no longer used in modern Hungarian cuisine. At that time and later, considerable numbers of Armenians, Czechs, Italians, Jews, Poles, Saxons and Slovaks settled in the Hungarian basin and in Transylvania, also contributing with different new dishes. Hungarian cuisine was influenced by Turkish cuisine under the Ottoman Empire. To a lesser extent, it was also influenced by Austrian cuisine under the Habsburg Empire, and Russian cuisine under the Soviet Empire. All told, modern Hungarian cuisine is a synthesis of ancient Central Asian/Uralic components mixed with primarily Balkan and Turkish, but also East Slavic, West Slavic, and Austrian influences. The food of Hungary can be considered a melting pot, with a culinary base formed from its own, original Hungarian cuisine.

Hungary is a major source of paprika, and it is the spice most closely associated with Hungary. However, peppers, the raw material in paprika production, originated from North America and was later introduced to the Old World, as part of the Columbian exchange. The spice, historically known as “Turkish pepper”, was introduced to Hungary during the Ottoman invasions of Hungary in the early 16th century, and was first used as a medicine. Its use in Hungarian cuisine was documented by the 18th century, and it was grown for markets by the early 19th century.

Historically Hungarian cuisine had a decisive role in the gastronomy of the Carpathian basin. Because of the Habsburg ruling class making it difficult for the kingdom to do industrial work, the country's small producer markets became prominent, and were therefore also called the monarchy's larder. Hungarian cuisine is famously rich in flavours and has also played a major role in the cuisine of neighbouring peoples.

== Hungarian meals ==
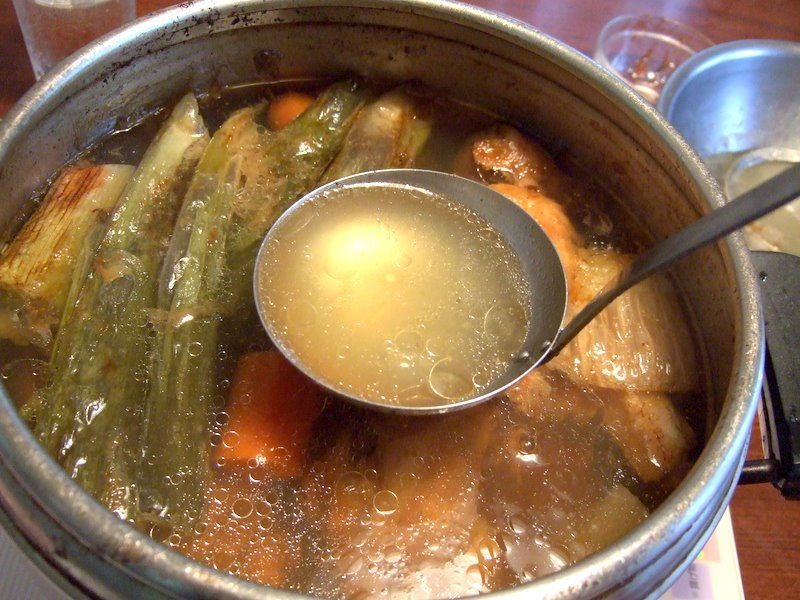
Hungarian lunch starts with soup. This is veal meat soup (borjúhúsleves).

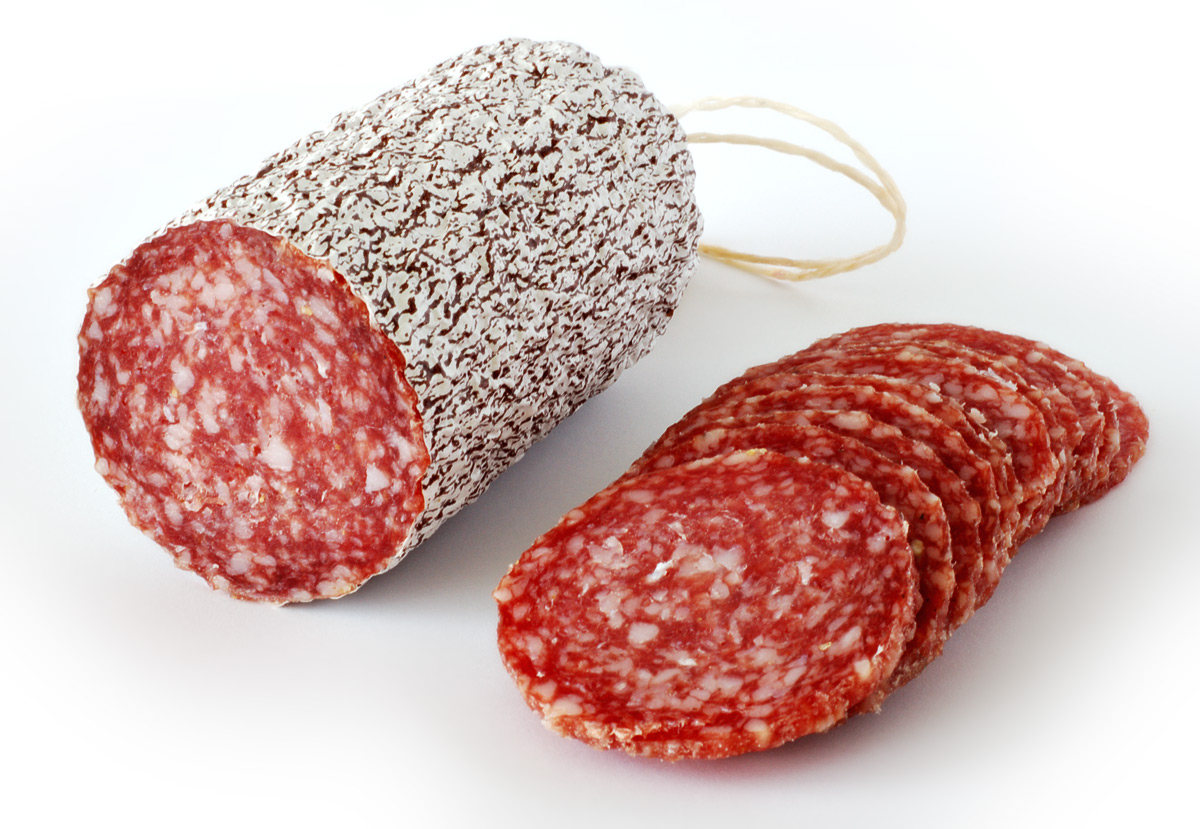
Winter salami is made from cured pork and spices, smoked slowly. During the process a special noble-mold is formed on the surface.

In Hungary, people usually have a large breakfast. Hungarian breakfast generally is an open sandwich with bread or toast, butter, cheese or different cream cheeses, túró cheese, tejföl or körözött (Liptauer cheese spread), cold cuts such as ham, liver pâté (called májkrém or kenőmájas), bacon, salami, mortadella, sausages such as kabanos, beerwurst or different Hungarian sausages or kolbász. Traditionally fresh tomatoes and green peppers (sometimes scallion, radish and cucumber) are served with these when they are in season. Eggs (fried, scrambled or boiled) may also be part of breakfast.

Some types of meat that were commonly eaten in the past (such as beef tongue, disznósajt (head cheese) or véres hurka (similar to black pudding) are now more associated with the countryside.

Meals are often eaten with savanyúság and millet.

Contemporary Hungarians do not always eat this typical breakfast. For many, breakfast is a cup of milk, tea or coffee with pastries, a bun, a kifli or a strudel with jam or honey, or cereal, such as muesli and perhaps fruit. Children can have rice pudding (tejberizs) or semolina cream (tejbegríz) for breakfast topped with cocoa powder and sugar or with fruit syrup. Bodzaszörp or hot drinks are preferred for breakfast. In the past, breakfast itself was much more important, often only breakfast and dinner were eaten. In those days, cabbage soup was a common breakfast.

Villásreggeli or brunch (literally 'breakfast with fork') is a more luxurious big breakfast given on special occasions or holidays. Often guests are invited. Deviled eggs, cold steak, cold salads, salmon omelettes, pancakes, a spicy cheese spread made with sheep milk cheese called körözött, caviar, foie gras, fruit salads, compote, fruit yogurts, fruit juices, champagne and pastries, cakes and cookies may be served.

Tízórai refers to a meal eaten between breakfast and lunch.

Lunch is the major meal of the day, traditionally with several courses, but often just one course in modern times. Cold or hot appetizers may be served sometimes (for example, fish, egg or liver), then soup. Soup is followed by a main dish. The main dish is a dish including meat, side dishes and salad (such as the uborkasaláta, a typical sidedish made with smetana, paprika and continental cucumber) or savanyúság (from pickled vegetables - paprika, cucumber, sauerkraut, etc.), which precedes the dessert. Fruit may follow. In Hungary, pancakes (or rather, crepes) may be served as a main dish or as a dessert but not for breakfast. Salad is typically served with meat dishes, made of lettuce with tomatoes, cucumbers and onions, or some pickled variant of them. A simple thin sliced cucumber or tomato salad in vinaigrette is also typical. Salads such as Salade Olivier or potato salad are made of boiled potatoes, vegetables, hard-boiled eggs, mushrooms, fried or boiled meat or fish, in vinaigrette, aspic or mayonnaise. These salads are eaten as appetizers or even as a main course.

Some people and children eat a light meal in the afternoon, called uzsonna, usually an open sandwich, pastry, slice of cake or fruit.

Dinner is typically less important than lunch, and there is no typical Hungarian dinner. It may either be a lunch-type meal, with multiple courses and the same foods one would serve for lunch, or it could be the same as a traditional Hungarian breakfast, with bread, cold cuts, cheeses, tomatoes and peppers as described above. When dinner is an important occasion it will be prepared the same way and with the same courses a full lunch would be. When it's not an important occasion, it's a good time to eat leftovers.

Hungarian meal times are somewhat flexible. Typical times are as follows: Breakfast 6-9 am; Lunch 12 noon-2 pm; Dinner 6-9 pm.

== Special occasions ==
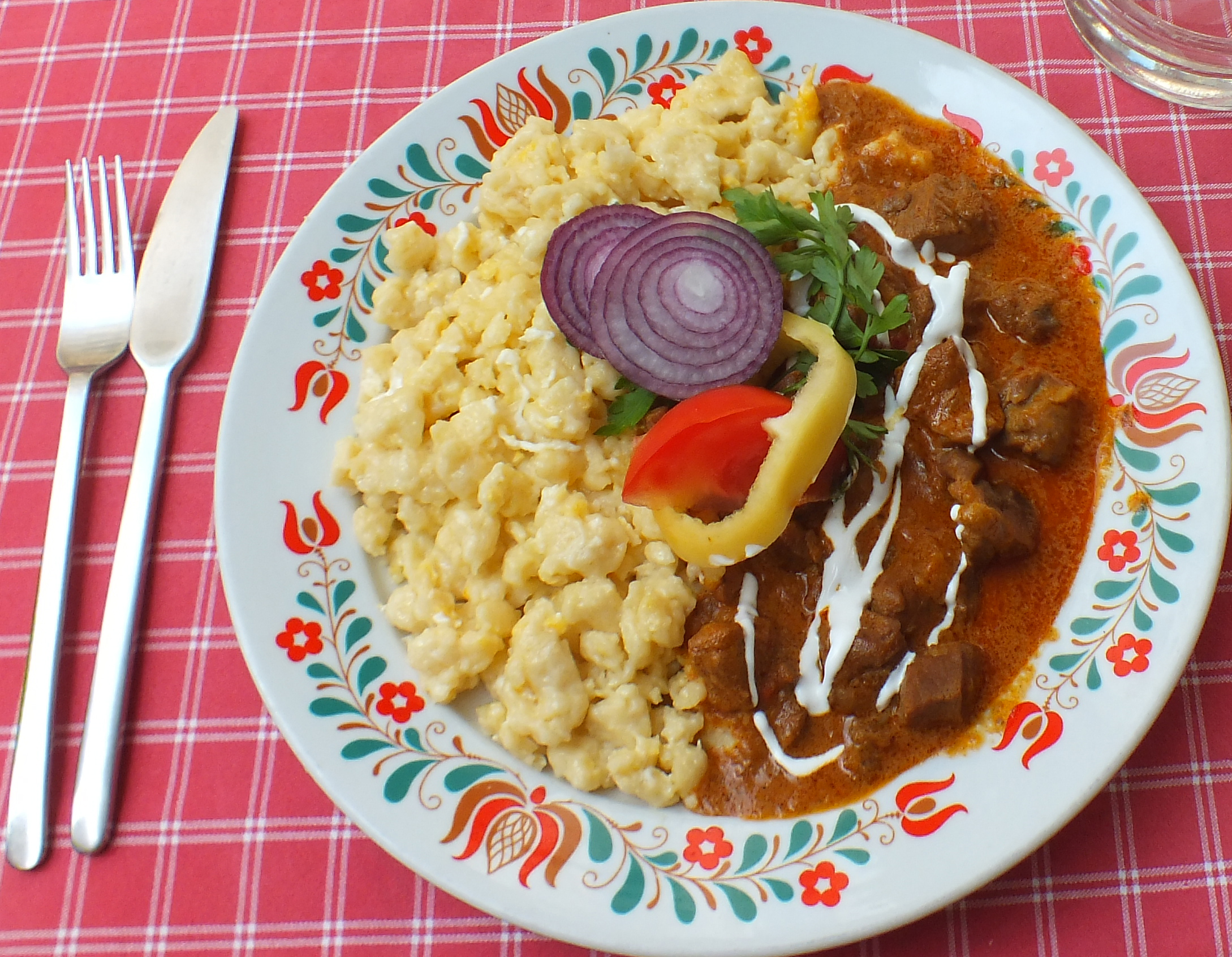
Pörkölt with nokedli

For Christmas, Hungarians have a fish soup called halászlé. Other dishes may be served, such as roast goose, roast turkey or roast duck, cabbage rolls (töltött káposzta). Pastry roll filled with walnut or poppy seed called (bejgli) is a usual Christmas food, and candies and sweets used to decorate the Christmas tree, such as szaloncukor are eaten during all Christmas, when everybody picks them and eats them directly from the tree. In some households, Lentil stew (lencse főzelék) is consumed to bring good luck and health in the upcoming years.

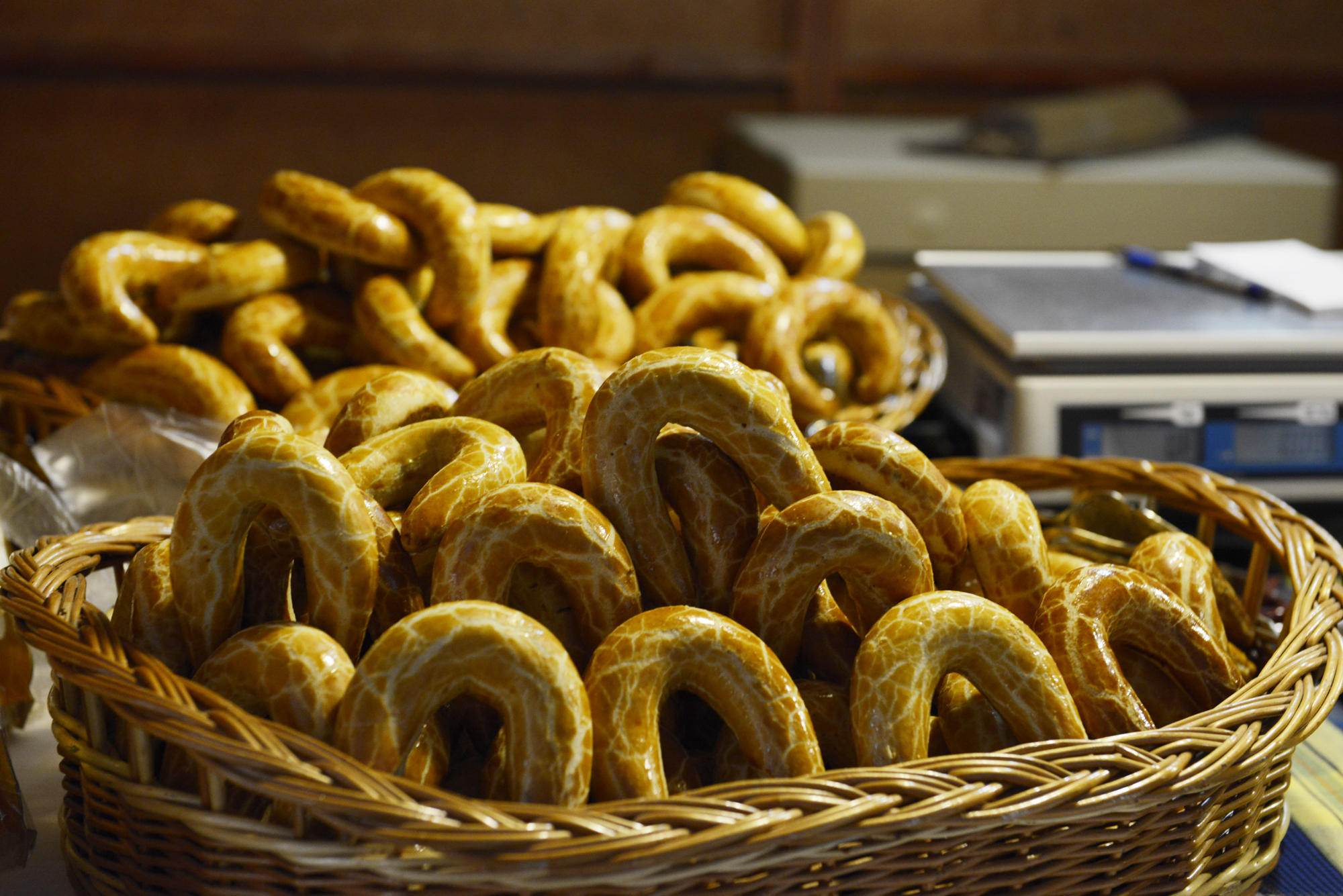
Pozsonyi kifli in a basket

Other traditional foods such as Pozsonyi kifli, a type of Bejgli is also commonly eaten in Christmas dinners (Pozsony being the original name of Bratislava), next to regular Bejglies and Strudels(rétes).

On New Year's Eve (Szilveszter), Hungarians traditionally celebrate with virsli (Vienna sausage) and lentil soup. On New Year's Day, it is common to eat either lentil soup or korhelyleves, a meaty sauerkraut soup said to cure hangovers.

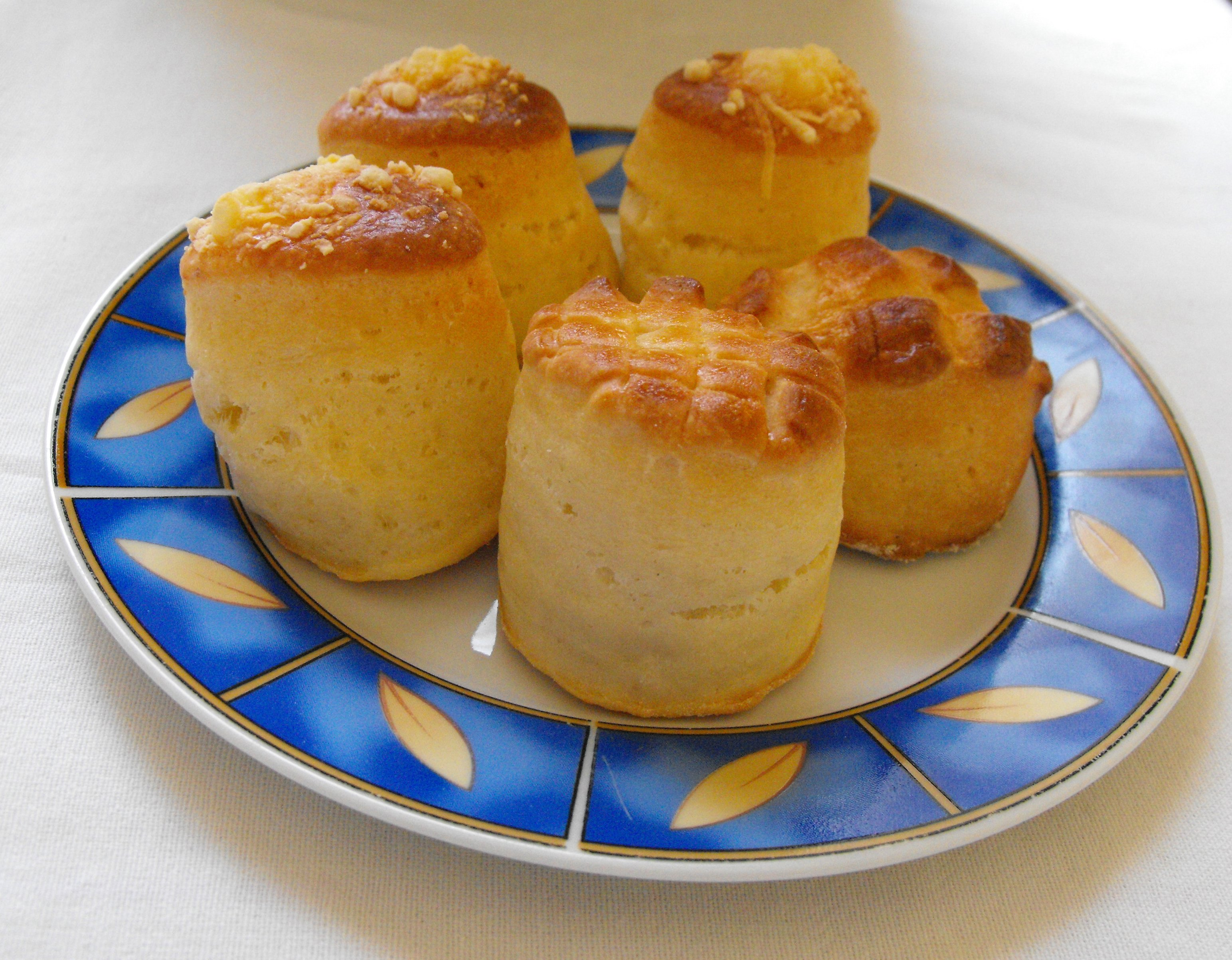
Hungarian pogácsa often made with pork rind, cheese or sugar sprinkled on top. It can have bread, meize, smetana and potato dough.

There is also a lot of superstition attached to New Year's food: on New Year's Eve, a coin is baked into the pogácsa. It is believed that whoever finds the lucky coin will have a lucky and prosperous New Year. But all the scones have to be gone before midnight, otherwise everything goes the other way.

It was tradition to bake rétes (strudels) as long as possible, because then you would be that much richer the following year.

It is also tradition for girls to put small pieces of paper with a man's name in the middle of dumplings or other raw dough. At exactly midnight, they threw them into the boiling water, the first male name that came up revealing the name of their future husband.

Easter is considered a huge event (Húsvét) and is celebrated all over Hungary. The families and their friends have the Mom and daughter prepare meals such as Smoked Ham with boiled eggs and small sandwiches and drinks quite commonly to have palinka on the table and then wait for Fathers and sons to arrive and say a poem (Husvéti Vers) and then spray on their hair with a perfume. Once the Father and son water the Mom and daughters known as Locsolkodás. They have a meal a drink then they go to the next family member until they visited all. In Szabolcs County make a special sweet yellow cheese, sárgatúró, made with quark (túró) and eggs. The kalács eaten then is often called pászkakalács.

== Typical Hungarian dishes ==
=== Soups ===
Name	Image	Description
Gulyásleves		Goulash soup; it is possible to cook gulyás like a stew as well (e.g. székelygulyás).
Halászlé		Famous hot and spicy fish soup with hot paprika. It is always made with the locally available freshwater fish selection (wider selection used, better the taste). There are some distinct recipes by which it is cooked slightly different, depending on the region of Hungary in which one makes it, and generally categorised based on the closest large body of water (river or large lake). The most famous versions are Szegedi, Bajai which are often part of the argument over this soup.
Húsleves		By the classic recipe it is made of strong beef or hen, often with bones, but many popular version use chicken or veal. Some other type meat is also possible such as wild duck, pheasant, or pigeon. This is a slow cooked broth like soup with a selection of vegetables. The cooking time depends on the type of meat, it can take up to 2–3 hours. Often served with different levesbetét (additional noodles), small pasta dumplings called csipetke, csigatészta, angel-hair noodles, but grízgombóc (semolina dumplings) or a light májgombóc (chicken liver dumplings) also popular.
Gyümölcsleves		A chilled, sweet soup with redcurrants, blackberries, sour cherries, apple, pear, quince or other seasonal fruit mix. It is fast cooked with cream or whole milk, some spices often accompanied with fruits, like cloves and cinnamon and sugar. This soup is often thickened with crème fraîche and flour mixture. It is served sometimes hot, but mainly cold from the refrigerator. It is very common throughout the summer with seasonal fruits, but the winter version can be made with oranges, clementines, or any sweet fruits available as either fresh or frozen.
Meggyleves		A popular variant on the fruit soup, which is made only with sour cherries.
Jókai bean soup		A rich bean soup, with many vegetables, smoked pork hock pieces and noodles. It is often made to be spicy or some sort of hot chili offered with it. Despite its richness it's served with and Hungarian sour cream on top and white bread, and in fact this soup is a lunch or dinner itself. Some households add some vinegar to it after serving it to the plate. This soup is named after the famous Hungarian writer Mór Jókai by Károly Gundel, the founder of one of the most known restaurants of Hungary in 1937.
Csontleves		A basic bone broth, usually served with spaghetti noodles, carrots, and turnips. It may also be served with stewed meat (usually pork), meat bones or parsley.
Gombaleves		A soup made from various wild mushrooms, sour cream is often added, but not necessarily the same amount as in cream of mushroom soup.
Palócleves		Similar to goulash, except lighter in color, sourer in taste (due to the sour cream), and with dill added. It is named after Mikszáth Kálmán's nickname, and not after the palóc people in Hungary.
Vadgombaleves		A wild mushroom soup that originated in Southern Hungary, often without sour cream, but not necessarily the same as the cream of mushroom soup.
Zöldségleves		A soup with vegetables, such as peas, carrots, turnips, and parsley.
Sóskaleves		Made from sorrel leaves in a broth, often with boiled eggs as well. Similar to green borscht, but thicker.
Krumplileves		Made from potatoes in a broth, frequently with slices of sausage, carrots, turnips or sour cream.
Pacalleves		A tripe soup eaten primarily by Hungarians living in Transylvania, usually seasoned with vinegar, sour cream, and garlic. May be eaten with bread and hot paprika on the side. Known as ciorbă de burtă for Romanians.
Borleves		A sweet wine soup, usually with cinnamon added and raisins and whipped egg whites on top.
Köménymagleves		A soup made from caraway seeds, often with pieces of stale bread (crouton).
Tojásleves		Same as köménymagleves, except with scrambled eggs added. Similar to the Slovenian national dish, prežganka.

=== Main courses ===
Name	Image	Description
Csirkepaprikás		A chicken stew with much sweet paprika, cream or sour cream called tejföl. Known as chicken paprikash or by some translated variant in many Central and Eastern European countries.
Paprikás krumpli		A stew with potatoes, ground red pepper with spicy or mild sausage (kolbász). For children sometimes franfurter (virsli) is added, partly substituting the heavier sausage. Popular food for open fire cooking.
Császármorzsa		Shredded, sweet crepe pieces with sugar sprinkled on top. Often served with jam (apricot or peach, usually) as well. Originates from Austria-Hungary, in Austria it is called Kaiserschmarrn.
Főzelék		A thinner, vegetable stew (almost like a soup, but thicker), similar to pottage. It can be made with a variety of vegetable bases, such as cabbage, potatoes, kidney beans, squash, spinach, lentils, tomatoes, sorrel, peas, dill, or some combination. Meatballs (fasírozott), spicy sausage (kolbász), or a fried egg (tükörtojás) may be added. It usually eaten at home as a home-cooked meal.: Zöldborsó főzelék (green pea stew) has two main variants. One it with whole green peas and a Béchamel sauce, with or without ground red pepper. The other green pea variant is medium smashed, without any flour, and may contain mint.; Lencsefőzelék (lentils stew) is made of brown lentils. Vinegar is added as a flavoring. It can be a side dish for roasted meat.; Tökfőzelék (squash stew) is often made with dill and a bit of vinegar, and served cold on hot summer days.; Sóska (sorrel stew) is often made with a pinch of sugar. On hot summer days that is served cold by itself or as a side dish.
Lecsó		A mixed vegetable stew, made of primarily tomato and Hungarian wax paprika, also found throughout the Balkans and Central Europe. It is somewhat similar to ratatouille, but without squash and zucchini. A variety exists called tojásos lecsó (lecsó with eggs), which has scrambled eggs mixed in. Other popular variant is rizses lecsó (lecsó with rice), which is made with cooked rice and often a bit of potato as well. Lecsós hús is roasted meat served with lecsó stew, often served with rice or tarhonya.
Székelykáposzta		A hearty pork and sauerkraut stew, often flavored with paprika, onion, and sour cream. It is named after the Hungarian writer, József Székely (a friend and contemporary of Sándor Petőfi), who apparently asked a kocsmáros (tavernman) to mix together leftover savanyúkáposzta-főzelék (sauerkraut pottage) and sertéspörkölt (pork stew) to create it.
Fasírozott or fasírt		Flat, pan-fried meatballs, made from minced meat (usually pork, veal or beef) with paprika and salt added for taste. Frequently eaten with főzelék, or served with rice or french fries.
Stefánia szelet		Hungarian meatloaf with hard boiled eggs in the middle. Makes decorative white and yellow rings in the middle of the slices, and is often served with potatoes.
Pörkölt		A stew similar to ragù, made with boneless meat (veal, pork, chicken, beef, lamb), sweet paprika, and some vegetables (always onions, though). Many variations exist throughout Hungary. One famous variation (pictured) is pacalpörkölt, which is often quite spicy and made with tripe. Some others are kakaspörkölt (made with rooster), kakashere pörkölt (made with rooster testicles), and ones using pork or chicken liver (sertésmáj pörkölt and csirkemáj pörkölt, respectively).
Palacsinta		A stuffed crêpe, usually filled with jam. Other fillings that exist are sweet quark cheese (túró) with raisins, Nutella, vanilla pudding, or meat. Some more specific/elaborate variations on the palacsinta are listed in the next few rows.
Csúsztatott palacsinta		Layered crêpes with sweet cottage cheese, raisins, jam, and walnuts, similar to the Mille crêpe. A variation of Rakott palacsinta.
Gundel palacsinta		Literally named Gundel crêpe. It was created by and named after Hungarian restaurateur Károly Gundel. They are stuffed with walnuts and served in chocolate sauce, and often flambéed (with rum). They traditionally also come with candied orange peels.
Hortobágyi palacsinta		A thin savory pancake, filled and covered with a meat stew, typically made from veal, onions, and spices. Often also topped with sour cream.
Rakott palacsinta		Layered crêpes with sweet cottage cheese, raisins, jam, and walnuts.
Liptai túró		A spicy cheese spread with paprika, caraway, and onions.
Rántott sajt		A flat cheese croquette; cheese rolled in breadcrumbs and deep-fried. It is frequently served with french fries, mashed potatoes, rice, rizi-bizi (green peas and rice mixed together, as shown in the picture), or vegetables.
Rántott hús		Originally from Austria. Meat that is tenderized, covered in eggs, flour, and breadcrumbs, then fried. Also known as Wiener schnitzel.
Rántott csirke		A chicken breast rolled in breadcrumbs and deep-fried; similar to Wiener Schnitzel. A rarer dish, rántott galamb, is made the same way, except with pigeon.
Rakott krumpli		A potato casserole made with some combination of eggs, paprika, spicy sausage, thick bacon (szalonna), quark cheese (túró), onions, sour cream or breadcrumbs.
Rakott káposzta		A layered cabbage dish that consists of cabbage, pörkölt, rice, sour cream, and spices. The dish comes from the Hungarians in Transylvania (Erdélyi).
Rakott zöldbab		A layered oven cooked food with cooked whole green beans, fried minced meat and rice. Often covered with smetana.
Slambuc		Similar to paprikás krumpli (potato stew), with added sheet pasta broken in irregular shapes. The pasta is roasted on oil or bacon's fat before adding to the stew. Often cooked on open fire in a cauldron, as cooking it in big quantity is easier.
Sólet		A Jewish-Hungarian stew made with kidney beans, barley, onions, paprika, and perhaps meat and eggs as well. It is similar to cholent.
Szilvásgombóc		Sweet plum dumplings, rolled in sweet, fried, buttered breadcrumbs or streusel. May also be served with nudli, which are made from the leftover dumpling dough.
Túrógombóc		Unlike szilvásgombóc, this sweet quark cheese (túró) dumpling has no filling, and is normally served with sour cream and icing sugar.
Töltött káposzta		A cabbage roll made from pickled cabbage, filled with a light minced pork meat and rice mix. It may contain minced paprika and be served in a tomato sauce with sour cream, but this is not always the case (as in the picture). It is frequently eaten around Christmas and New Year's, but can still be eaten year-round.
Töltött tojás		Literally translates as stuffed egg or casino egg, respectively. Deviled eggs served cold (in mayonnaise) or warm (baked in the oven with sour cream), with parsley, green onions, or paprika powder added to taste.
Töltött paprika		Stuffed peppers filled with pork mince and rice mixture, served in a tomato sauce with salty boiled potatoes. Also found throughout the Balkans, where it is often known as punjena paprika. The Hungarian version uses Hungarian wax pepper of the variant TV (meaning to-be-stuffed).
Pecsenye		A thin pork steak served with cabbage or in the dish fatányéros (pictured), a Hungarian mixed grill on wooden platter.
Cigánypecsenye		A variant on pecsenye which literally translates as Gypsy roast. Consists of fried or spit-roasted pork cutlets, with thick bacon as well, which are spiced with paprika, salt or pepper. Usually served with roasted potatoes or french fries or perhaps savanyúság (pickled vegetables) (pictured).
Vesepecsenye		Beef tenderloins, usually seasoned with paprika and salt.
Szűzpecsenye		Literally means virgin roast. pork tenderloins, which are usually prepared the same as above. May also be made into szűzérme (lit. virgin medallions; pork medallions) or szűztekercs (rouladen; thinly-cut tenderloins, stuffed with minced meat, vegetables or other things).
Brassói aprópecsenye		This dish is clearly named after Brassó, the former Hungarian name for Brașov, but it is unclear how, and various legends have arisen as explanation. It consists of diced pieces of pork and potatoes, which are pan-fried with onions, bacon, and seasoning (salt, pepper or paprika). This dish, despite the simple ingredients, needs some practice to master.
Mákos tészta		Very famous and common, an easy egg noodle dish, made with ground and sweetened poppy seeds. It has a distinct look and taste.
Diós tészta		Boiled egg noodle dish served with ground walnuts and sugar, often with lekvár (jam) or honey.
Gránátos kocka		A home-cooked, simple egg noodle dish, made with potatoes and paprika powder. Often served with pickled gherkins or other pickled vegetables on the side.
Túrós csusza		An egg noodle dish, made with quark cheese (túró) and served savory (with bacon) or sweet (with sugar).
Vadas		Literally translates as with venison. Also known as vadas mártás (vadas sauce). Originally cooked with venison, such as wild boar, deer, wild duck or hare. But often made with beef, veal, rabbit and rarely with chicken. The meat (pre-cooked, in case of red meat) ready cooked in a brown or dark orange coloured vegetable ragout with carrots and other root vegetables. It is typically served with bread dumplings. In some cases the ragout is made separate and served on side of roast venison or beef slices. The venison version often accompanied with mushrooms.
Pásztortarhonya		Literally translates as shepherd egg barley. A hearty dish consisting of egg barley, potatoes, onion, kolbász, and paprika, sometimes also with bacon and other vegetables.
Tarhonyás hús		Egg barley with pieces of minced meat (usually pork), but sometimes potato and kolbász as well, along with various spices.
Mátrai borzaska		Pork loin or chicken breast in fried, grated potato coating, served with sheep cheese gravy and sour cream. A famous palóc dish, which originates from the Mátra region.
Harcsapaprikás		Catfish paprikash, traditionally served with sheep cheese potato dumplings.
Lángos		Translates into flamey. Lángos is the most famous Hungarian street food. A deep fried flatbread typically served with garlic, sour cream and cheese.
Hétvezér tokány		A famous stew dish, which needs to be prepared from at least three kinds of meat: chicken, pork, beef or wild game meat. Vegetables and mushroom is usually also added in the stew and it is served with potato dumplings, fried potatoes or rice. The name translates into stew of the seven chieftains of the Magyars.

=== Others ===
Szárnyas Brassói
a variant of the pecsenye.
Kakashere pörkölt
Rooster Testicle Pörkölt
Cibere
a fermented drink made from wheat or rye bran, popular during Lent. In Romanian it is called Borș.
Sültvér
fried blood often eaten with hot peppers and nokedli.
Kukoricakása
Cornmeal porridge with paprika and cumin
Puliszka
a Hungarian hominy. The Csángó people make Álivánka sponge cake and Bóc out of it, a cottage cheese puliszka-dumplings, often with special blue molded cottage cheese.

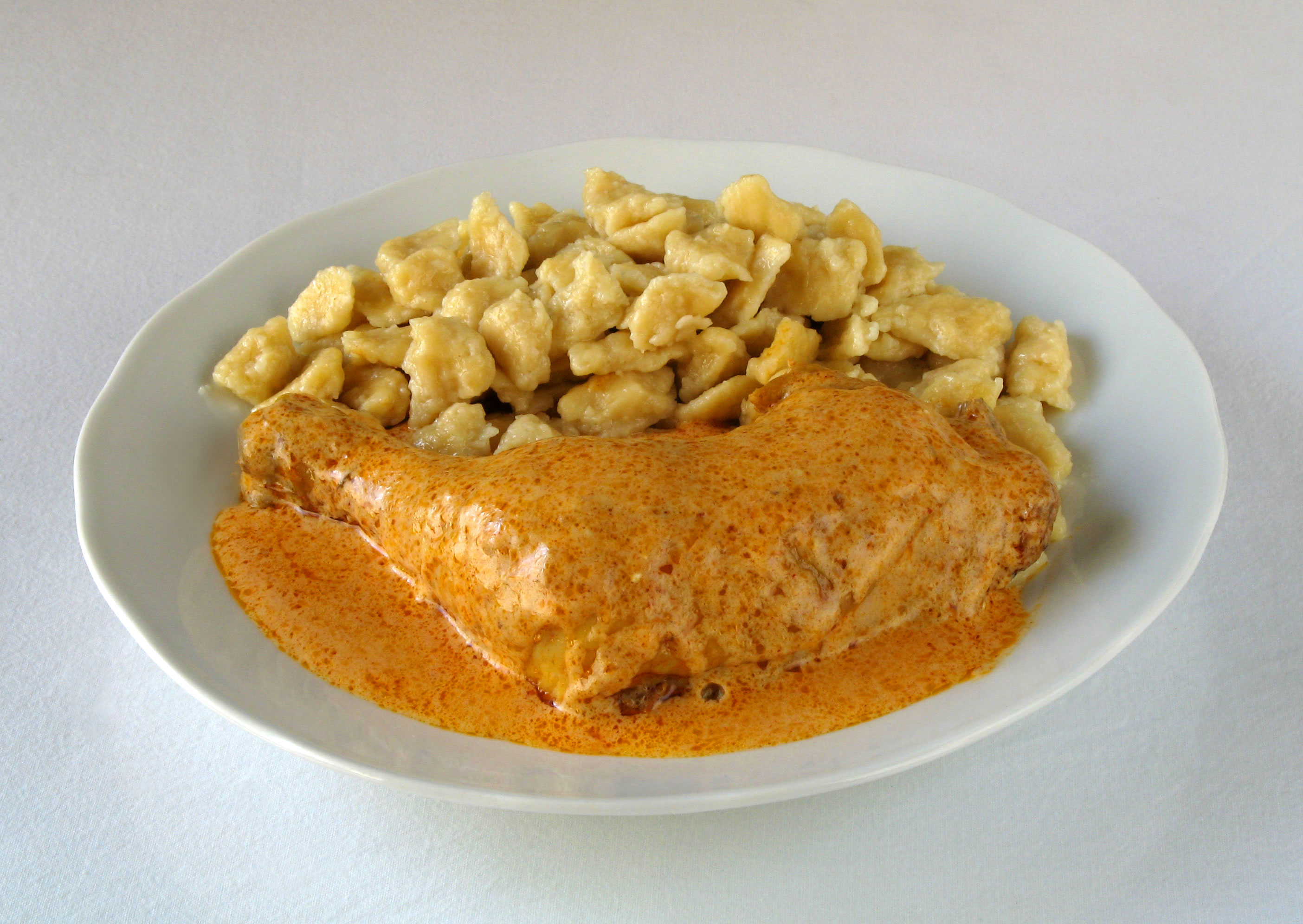
Csirke Paprikás Tejfölösen with nokedli

Nyárlőrinci tutajos (raft of Nyárlőrinc)
Dumplings made of tarhonya, bacon and crushed potatoes. The tripe (pacal) is a very common dish in the country, made into stews and soups and also fried.
Csirke Paprikás Tejfölösen
Chicken Paprikash with sour cream and gravy, usually eaten with fusilli or nokedli. A number of paprikashes exist, including pork- and mushroom - paprikash. Sometimes Pigeon Paprikash was also eaten.
Paradicsomos káposzta
Tomato and cabbage dish eaten with fasirt or pork ribs
Tejleves
a milk-based sweet "soup", in multiple flavours.
Bugaci Vegyes Pörkölt
a pörkölt variant from Bugac which contains pork, beef shank and salo.
Székely lepény
"Szekler pie" a bacon, onion, sour cream and paprika flatbread, somewhat similar to the lángos, but uses a different dough (usually made from lepénykenyér).
Fatányéros
Traditional dish of Transylvanian Hungarians.
Wine soup
Traditional vanilla, cinnamon, white wine flavoured soup.
Tócsni
A Hungarian potato pancake.
Rablóhús
Hungarian skewer of roasted chicken and vegetables
Grenadírmars
potato pasta served with bell pepper and sour cream
Betyárkrumpli
potato dish with eggs, salo and szalonna.
Betyárpörkölt bagolyfül nokedlivel
"betyár's pörkölt with owl-ear shaped nokedli"
Lebbencs leves
potato and smoked bacon soup with lebbencs tészta.
Körömpörkölt
Traditional pork nail pörkölt.
Fish Paprikash
its ingredients similar to the paprikash.
Mundéros hal
a spit-roasted fish.
Pork strew and Pig Pörkölt
Pork is made in both stew (ragu) and pörkölt forms.
Tordai Pogácsa
The Tordai pogácsa, a similar gastronomic attractions to the pecsenye of Torda (now: Turda). The pastry is much larger than the average pogácsa, with the size of a smaller baking tray. The Hungarian peasant population living there has been making it for hundreds of years, albeit with varying recipes.
Káposztás tészta
cabbage pasta dish
Dödölle
toasted flat potato dumplings with sour cream and szalonna.

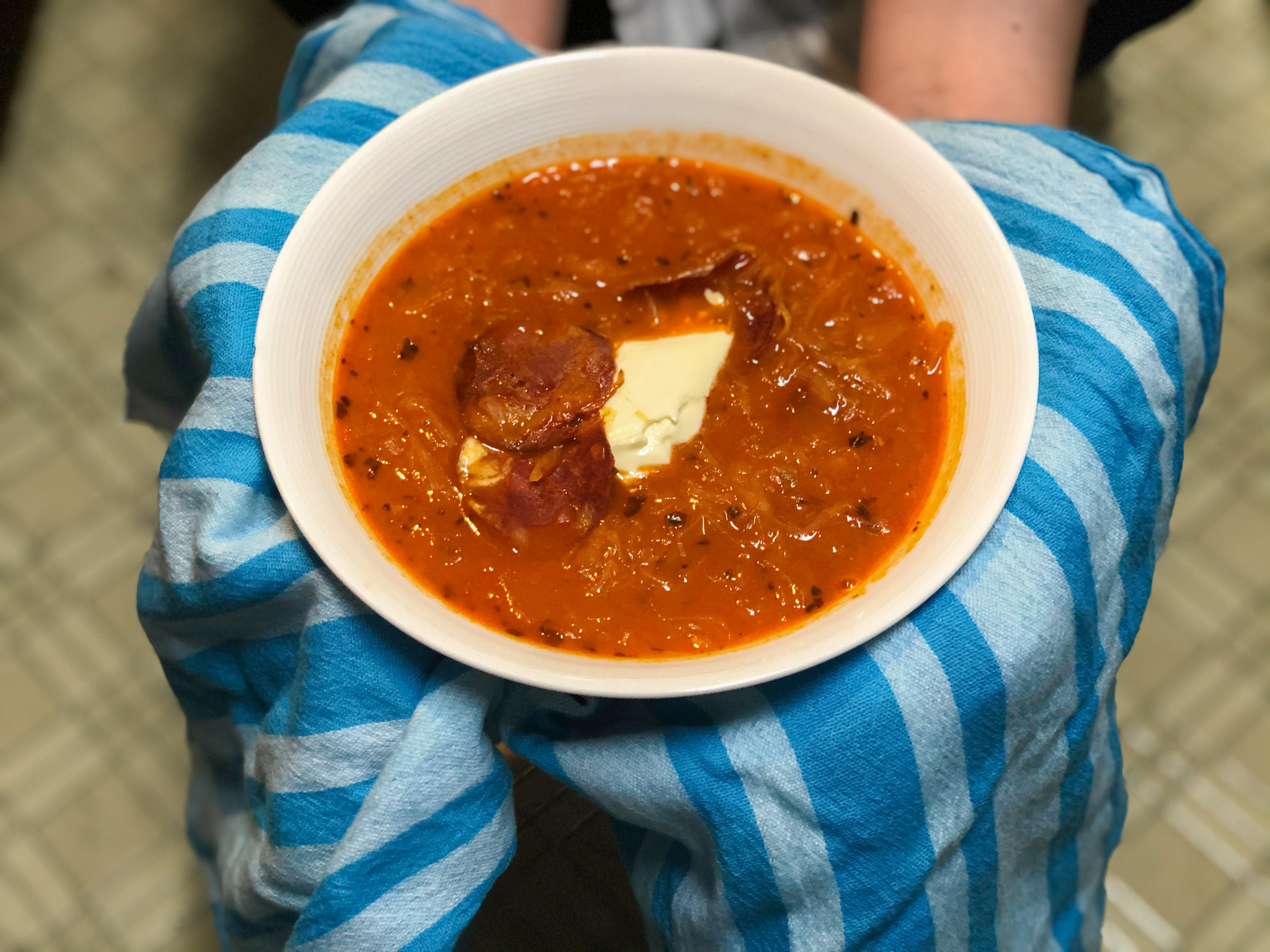
Korhelyleves

Korhelyleves
kolbász-sauerkraut soup with tejföl
Agglegénytál
dish from fried potato, some kolbász, roasted tomatoes and pepper with eggs poured on top.
Kukoricakása
Onion and red onion Cornmeal with bacon, topped with paprika and lard
Parsley Lapcsánka
Deep fried potato flatbread with parsley eaten with tejföl and onion
Rákóczi Rostélyos
button mushroom stew, with pear-shaped pastry ornament
Pljeskavica
grilled dish consisting of a meat patty similar to hamburger, served as a street food in Hungary

==== Bogrács and Herder foods ====
Hortobágyi Húsos Palacsinta
Slambuc
Paprikás krumpli
Alföldi rakott tarhonya
Babgulyás
red bean-goulash soup
Pásztortarhonya
roasted tarhonya and szalonna topped with kolbász, potato, pepper, tomato and paprika.
Betyárkrumpli
a type of rakott krumpli with star shaped szalonna
Tokány
Traditional Hungarian pörkölt type from Máramaros (now: Maramures) with over 20 variations (English: transylvanian pörkölt, Romanians use it as tocană)
Vetrece
Transylvanian food similar to Tokány, eaten with potato-schupfnudels (burgonyanudli), sour cream, and szalonna.
Betyáros
lebbencs pasta with cottage cheese and szalonna
Betyárszelet
this name also refers to a meat dish and a sweet
Birkapörkölt
Mutton pörkölt
Szürkemarha-gulyás
Hungarian-grey-goulash
Steer and Mangalitsa skewers
Harcsapaprikás
Catfish paprikash
Vadas marha
beef dish with carrot-based yellowish sauce and dumplings
Bivalypörkölt
Pörkölt from the Hungarian domestic water buffalo
Sweet pastas
with walnut, poppy seed, and semolina-and-jam toppings

=== Pasta types ===
Csiga pasta: small twisted pasta, made to put in soups

Csipetke or Csipötke: small pebble-shaped pasta. In Szeged it was popular to put in soup.

Galuska: Eaten with paprikash, as tövises galuska or with sour cream, cheeses, eggs.

Gyufa pasta: matchstick shaped pasta, most commonly used in Baja fisherman's fish soups.

Lebbencs tészta: flat rectangular pasta, used in the dishes lebbencs leves and öreglebbencs

Nokedli: Similar to the Galuska. Used in different types of pörkölts and paprikash and in pea soup.

Orsós pasta: similar to Fusilli

Szabógallér: triangular lace-edged pasta

Tarhonya: Very small, caviar-sized pasta.

Tördelt tészta: pasta straps, used in Mácsik (poppy seed pasta variety)

=== Főzelék ===
Főzeléks are considered very important for health. It is neither a soup nor a main course. It is similar to Goulash which, although a soup, can be a substitute for a main course. Common flavours include yellow pea, bean, green pea, red lentil, broccoli, spinach, onion, potato, pumpkin, carrot, apple, and sometimes even cherry.

=== Sausages and cold cuts ===
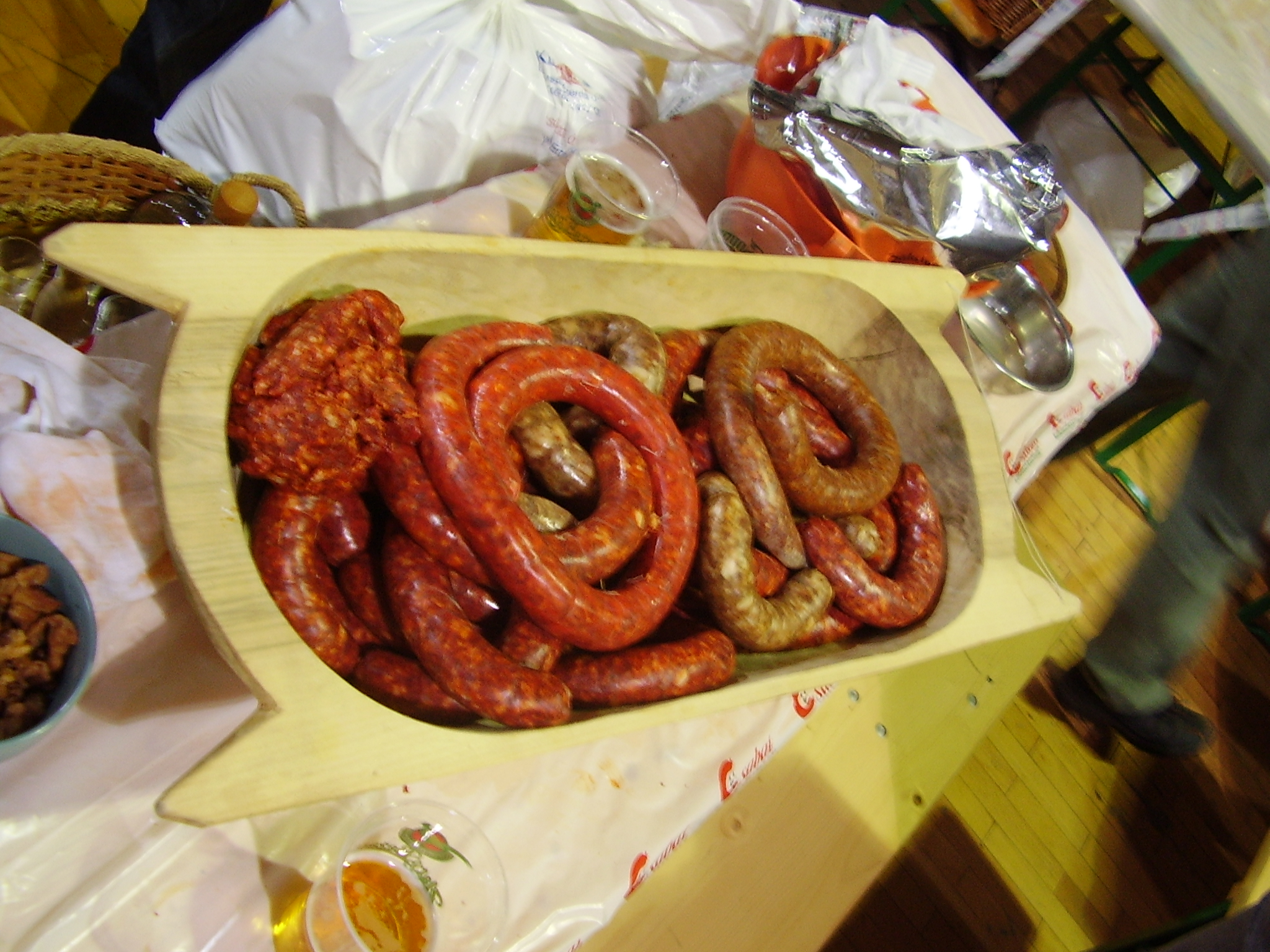
Various Hungarian sausages at the Csaba Sausage Festival in Békéscsaba, Hungary

- Hurka (boiled sausage, three main types: liver sausage called májas hurka, made of pork liver, meat and rice; a liverless variant of the májas hurka called húsos hurka and black sausage called véres hurka, which is equivalent to the black pudding)
- Téliszalámi (or Winter salami, salami made of spiced meat, cold smoked, and dry ripened, the most famous brand made by Pick Szeged)
- Herz Szalámi
- Csabai szalámi and kolbász (spicy salami and smoked sausage, made in the town of Békéscsaba)
- Gyulai kolbász (spicy sausage, made in the town of Gyula)
- Debreceni kolbász (Debrecener sausage)
- Disznósajt (a special type of head cheese, made of mixed meat slices, spices, paprika, and pieces of bacon cooked in spicy stock, which is then stuffed into a pig's stomach. Disznófejsajt is also popular)
- Szalonna (Hungarian bacon, fatback, back bacon rind, has more fat than usual breakfast bacon)
- Virsli (a Frankfurter-like long and thin sausage, consumed boiled with bread and mustard)
- Lókolbász (Horse sausage)

=== Pastry culture ===
In Hungary, there are a great variety of pastries and baked goods and the language even classifies them. For example, in general, a batyu is a square or pentagonal pastry (e.g. cherry or cottage cheese batyu), a "fonottka" is yarn-ball shaped, "párna" as the name suggests is any pillow-shaped usually puffed pastry, but the "táska" (e.g. virslis táska, cherry táska) is usually used for triangular, rolled or braided filled-pastries.

Molnárka: Along the kifli and the cipó this is another iconic breadtype. It has a shiny texture like hamburger buns, but is oval shaped. It is commonly used to make sandwiches.

Cipó: A circular loaf, smaller than normal bread (the average Hungarian bread being 3 kg). According to official governmental definition (from MÉ), a bread smaller than 500g margin is classified as a cipó.

Pityókás kenyér: potato bread common in Transylvania.

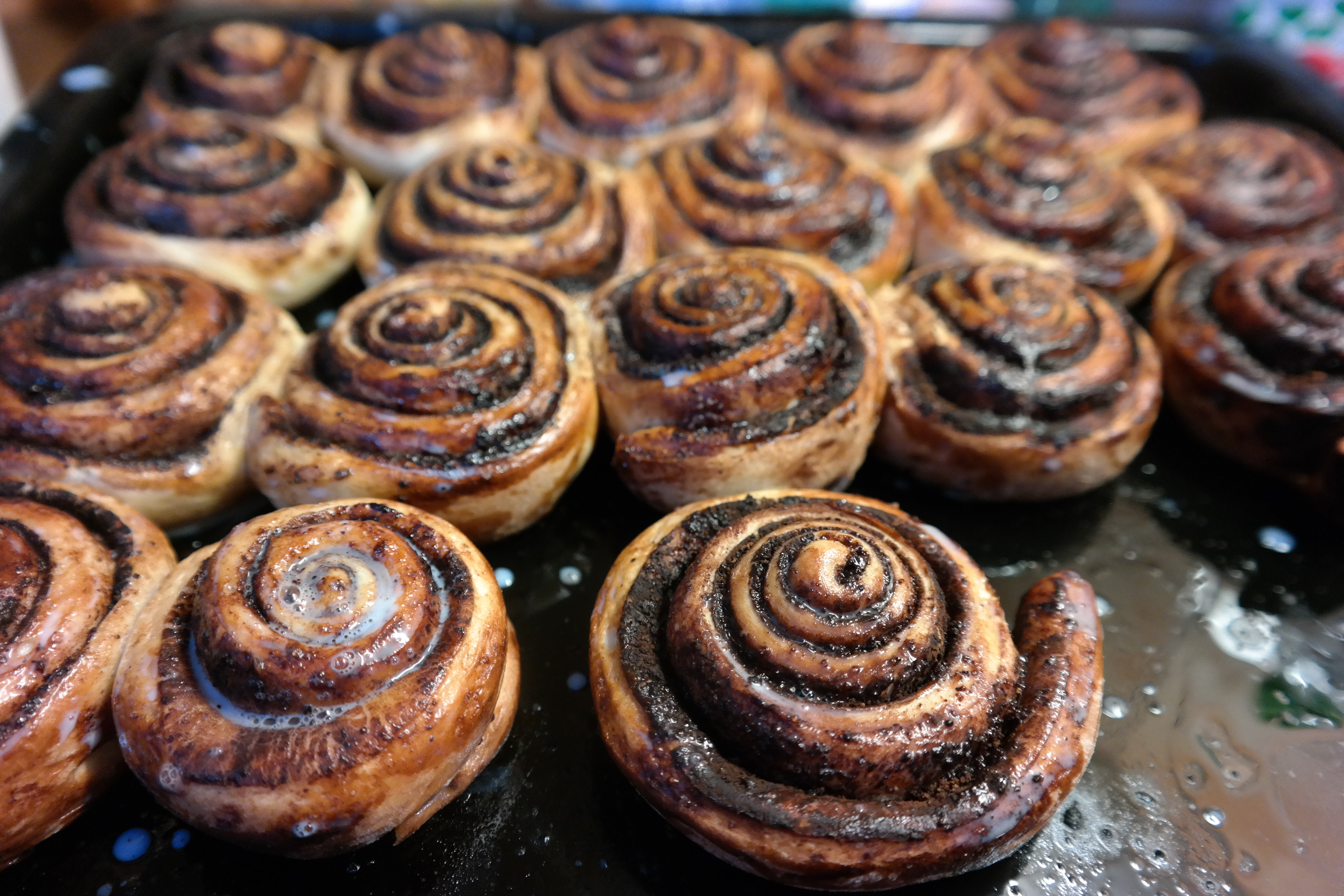
Kakaós csiga

Kakaós csiga: ("Chocolate snails") traditional Hungarian pastry with chocolate filling. It was originally called csokoládés tekerge. They are often dusted with icing sugar or covered with white chocolate.

Molnárpogácsa: a large flattened pogácsa type pastry. The story goes that it was given to the miller's apprentices as payment.

Stangli: Often used to describe straight (both twisted and smooth) kifli. A stangli is a rectangular bread stick, usually 30 cm long, sprinkled with cheese or seeds. Most often sold in 8–10 cm bars in boxes as snacks for gatherings.

Dübbencs: Smooth surface rolled bread flavoured with dill

Béles: The Béles is a pastry filled with raisin and curd or fruit jams. In Transylvania, porridge-filled Béles was often eaten on New Year's Eve.

Darázsfészek: a traditional Hungarian vanilla roll, originating from Northern Hungary, and the palóc regions.

=== Sweets and cakes ===
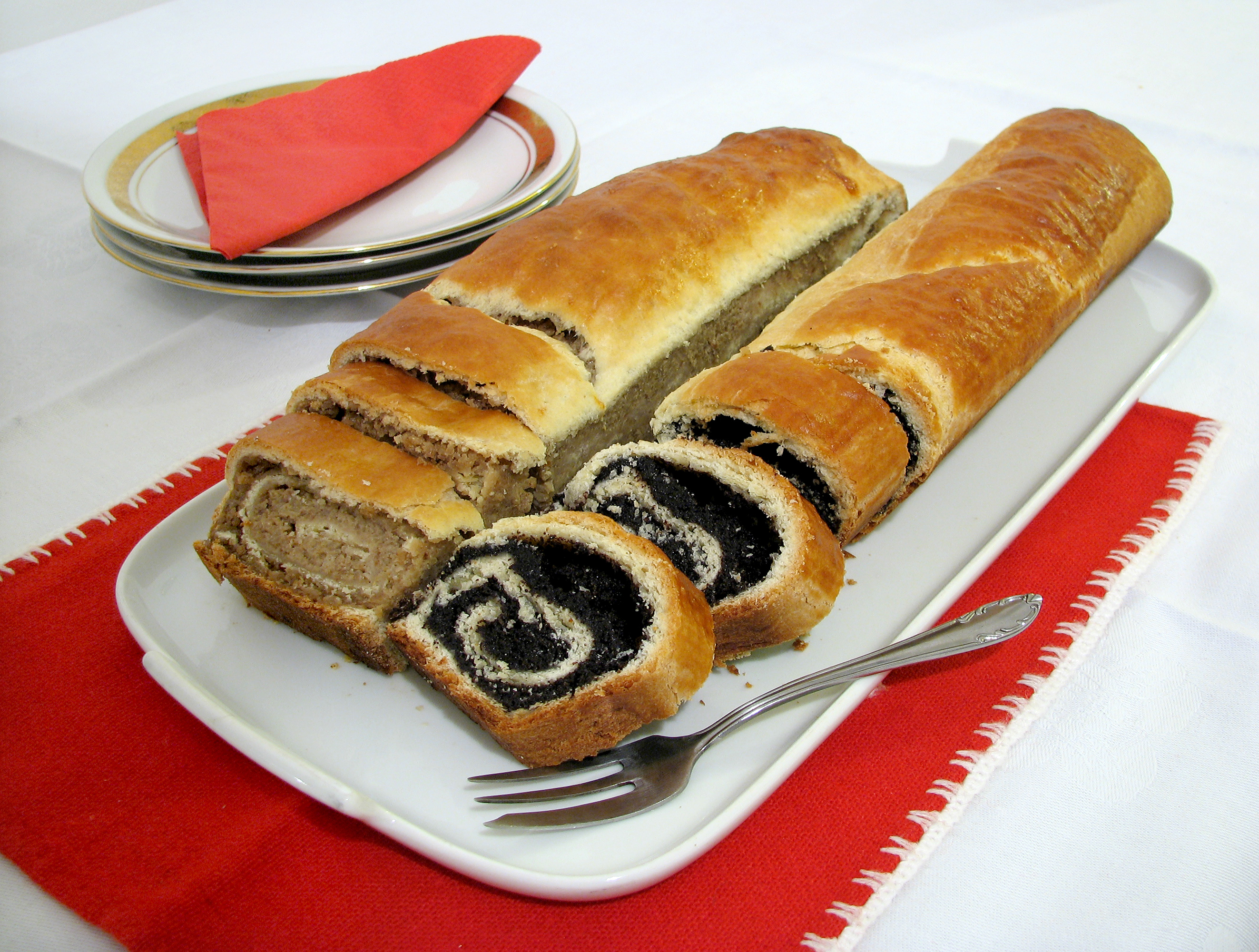
Bejgli, poppy seed roll

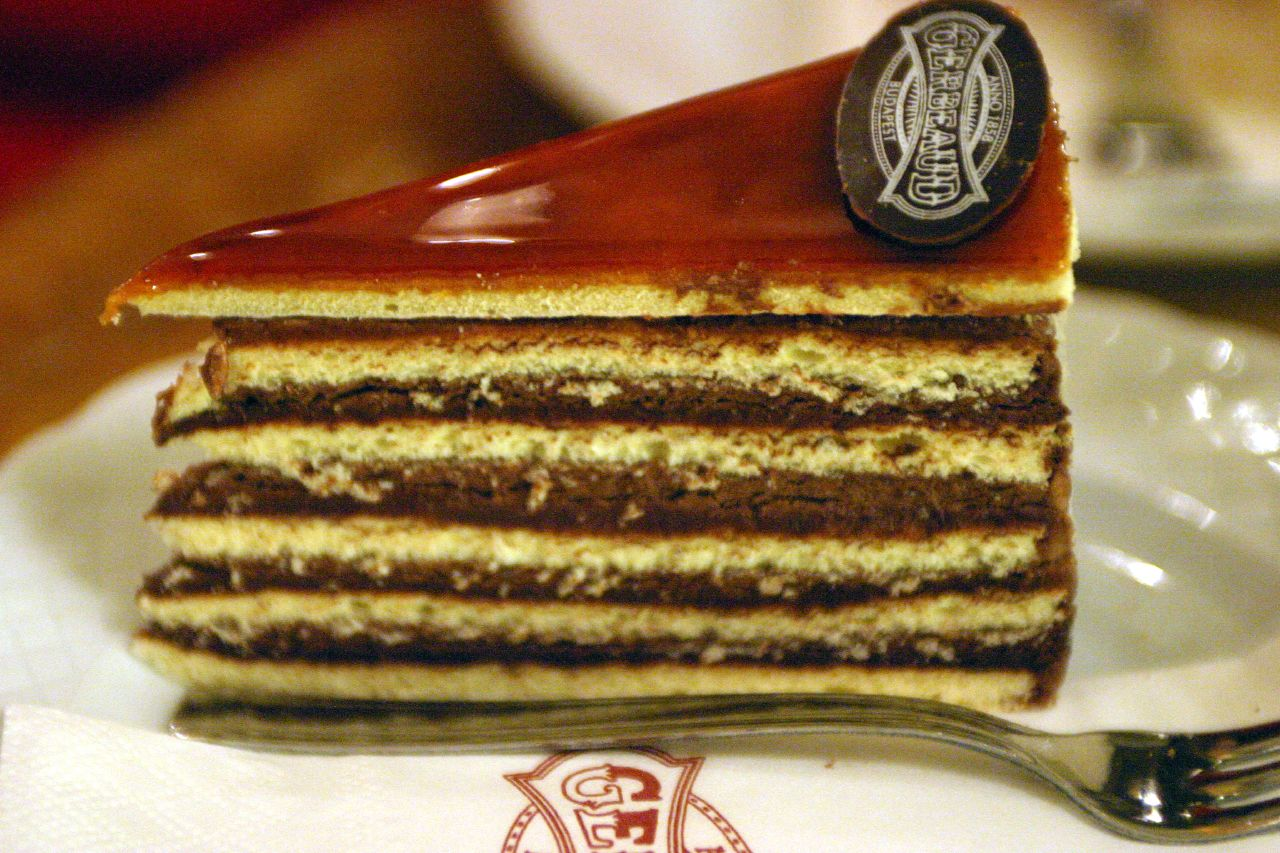
Dobos cake

- Dobos Cake (sponge cake layered with chocolate paste and glazed with caramel and nuts)
- Rákóczi Túrós (an iconic túró cake name after János Rákóczi)
- Derelye (a type of pierogi filled with plums, cottage cheese, sour cherries or sometimes potatoes. In the 17th century ones stuffed with minced meat were also common)
- Rigó Jancsi (Cube-shaped sponge cake with dark chocolate glaze)
- Gesztenyepüré (cooked and mashed sweet chestnuts with sugar and rum, topped with whipped cream)
- Barátfüle (A pierogi filled with poppy seeds, cottage cheese or plum jam. The Barátfüle is similar to derelye but the Szentesi barátfüle, like a hamantash has a hard crust.
- Bejgli (cake roll eaten at Christmas and Easter)
- Borzas Kata or Borzas gombóc refers to spiked dumplings, made by putting a small lump of laskadough in the middle of a vanilla cream and frying the whole thing in lard. But the Borzas Kata is more commonly used a walnut-peach jam or chocolate cake slice with a similar "spiky" top, hince the similarity.
- Kürtőskalács Stove cake or Chimney cake, cooked over an open fire — a Transylvanian specialty, famous as Hungary's oldest pastry.
- Fonott kalács ("braided kalach") is circular or rod-shaped and braided while the Easter pászkakalács cylindrical, with braided decoration. The rózsakalács is shaped like a bouquet of roses. There are many other variants such as Jász ostoros, kulcsos and even has a paprika flavoured variant.
- Babka (kalach with creamy filling, where this filling is in the ridges)
- Fumu (special swaddled infant shaped kalach)
- There are many other kalács types, such as the Fatörzskifli (a breakfast kifli-shaped kalach) the Guduc kalács (a large circular pastry from Torda)
- Angel wings (the Csörögefánk or Forgácsfánk a crispy, light Hungarian Angel Wing fry cookies, a twisted thin fried cookie made of yeast dough, dusted with powdered sugar)
- Vaníliás kifli (vanilla croissant, small, crescent shaped biscuits)
- Piskóta (thin, light, sweet delicate, crispy cookie)
- Krémes (Known as vanilla slice or custard slice, is a custard and chantilly cream cream cake dessert commonly associated with the former Austro-Hungarian Monarchy)
- Rétes (layered pastry with a filling that is usually sweet)
- Csiga (literally snail - a rolled pastry that comes in many different coatings and flavors, usually walnut, poppy seed, chocolate, and vanilla pudding)
- Flódni (cake with four different fillings, which are poppy seed, walnut, apple, and plum jam)
- Képviselő Fánk (Hungarian Cream Puff made from choux paste and filled with vanilla cream. Literal Translation - 'Ambassador Doughnut')
- Kuglóf (Kuglóf cake, a traditional Austro-Hungarian coffee party cake)
- Lekváros Bukta (a baked brick-shaped dessert filled with jam, túró or ground walnuts)
- Lekváros tekercs (rolled up soft sponge cake filled with jam)
- Lekvár (thick Hungarian jam)
- Birsalma sajt (Quince cheese, or quince jelly made of quince fruits. Its plum version is called szilvéz)
- Törökméz (a sweet sticky white nougat paste cooked with sugar, eggwhites, honey, bits of walnuts, spread between two wafer sheets)
- Halva (a Transylvanian sweet confection, made with sunflower seeds, of Turkish origin)
- Madártej (Floating island, a dessert made of milk custard with eggwhite dumplings floating on top)

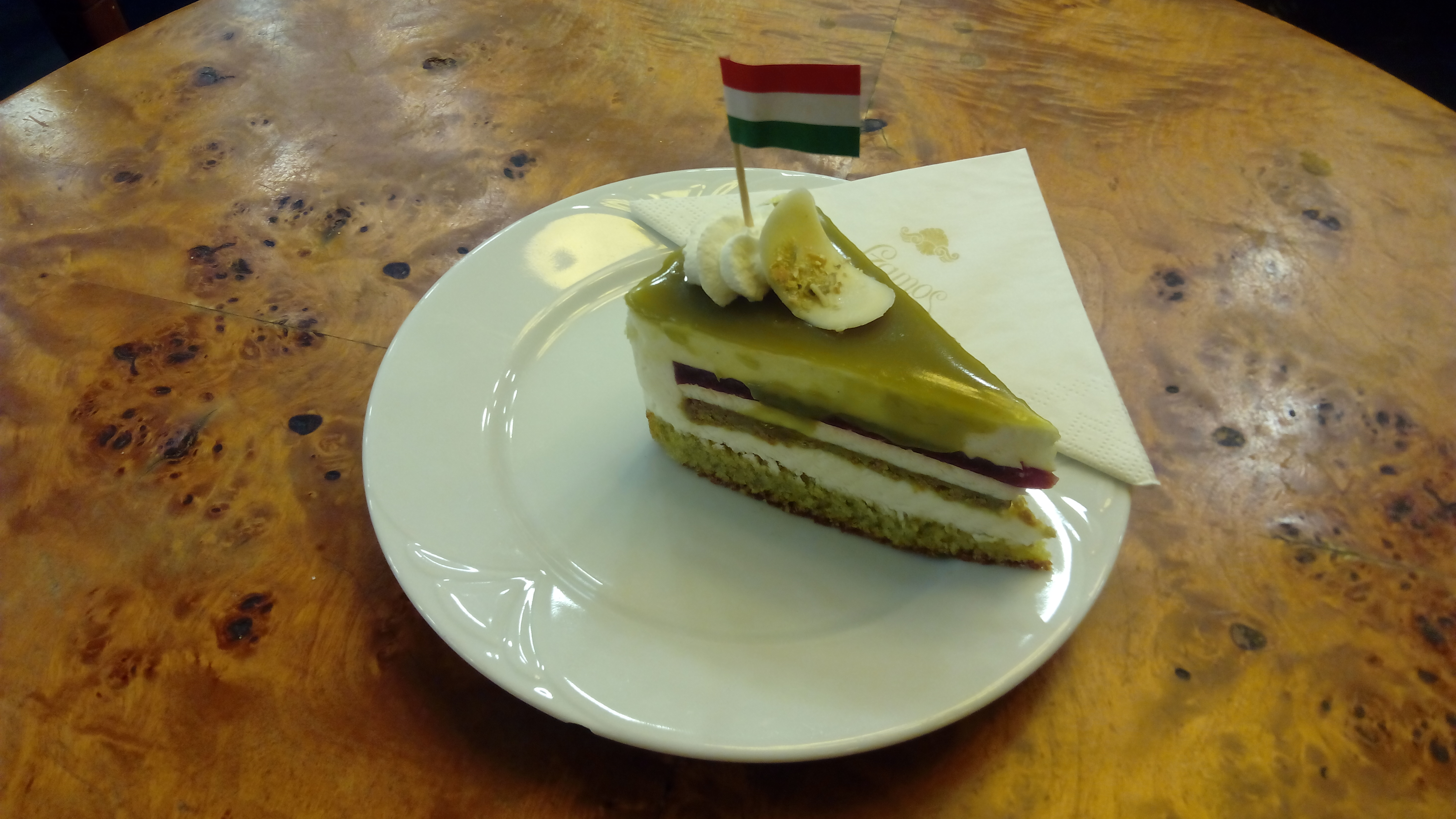
Őrség Zöld Aranya ("The Green Gold of Őrség")

- Őrség Zöld Aranya (white chocolate pumpkin seed cream cake, using special pumpkin seed oil from the Őrség region.)
- Túró Rudi (sweet quark cheese - called túró - filled chocolate bar)
- Szaloncukor (flavoured candies that hang on the Christmas tree, eaten at Christmas)
- Arany galuska (dumplings, or dough balls rolled in butter, sugar, and nuts and packed together to make a pull-apart cake, with vanilla custard)
- Vargabéles (Hungarian strudel or Noodle Pie)
- Eszterházy torta (Consists of buttercream spiced with cognac or vanilla and walnuts)
- Somlói galuska (Somló-style Sponge Cake)
- Molnár kalács (a round wafer elaborately decorated with folk symbols and pictures. It is eaten with sweet toppings or with szalonna baked into it. It is a traditional Luca nap food)
- Linzer torta (a tart with crisscross design of pastry strips on top) and Isler cookies are both Austro-Hungarian sweets
- Minyon / Kugler (Austro-Hungarian sponge cake cubes usually flavoured with rum, chocolate, lemon, vanilla or punch)
- Palacsinta (crêpe-like variety of pancake)
- Rakott palacsinta (traditional pancake cake, with different fillings, ofthen with 30 tiers)
- Győri édes and Pilóta (both are popular cookies) Vargabéles (It uses rétes dough with vanilla-cottage cheese cream, with vermicelli keeping it together. It was invented by a famous Hungarian cook from Kolozsvar (now Cluj-Napoca), Marika Darvas.)
- Mézes Puszedli (Hungarian cookie, which evolved from the busserl but has a different recipe)
- Mákos guba (a poppy seed-based dessert found throughout Central Europe; consists of slices of sweet(ened) kifli and poppy seeds boiled in milk with butter, often with various nuts and dried fruits as toppings)
- Túrós lepény or túrós pite (dessert bars made from sweetened túró. A variant called kapros-túrós lepény also exists, which has dill added)
- The Balaton, Zala, Néger, László, Kókusz, Jeges and Somogy Kocka and the Boci Szelet are all different types of small cube-shaped cakes
- Ökörszem (cake-cup filled with túró)
- Zserbó (chocolate, peach jam, walnut cream cake)
- Hájas süti (trough shaped biscuits usually filled with jam)
- Máglyarakás (fruity cake cube with a thick layer of eggwhite foam on top)
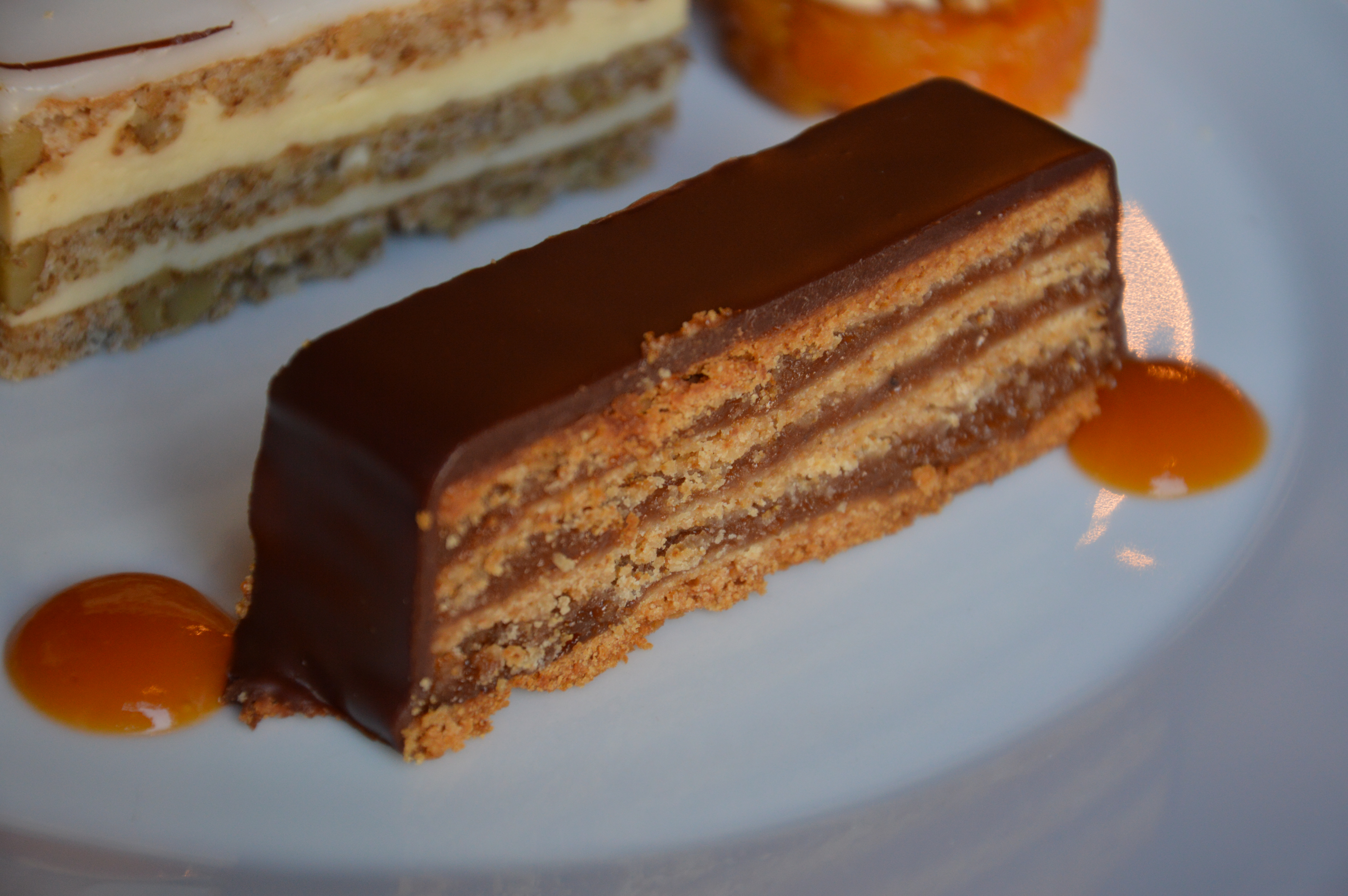
  Zserbó on Vörösmarty tér
- Levendula fagylalt (lavender ice cream)
- Ibolya fagylalt (viola (plant) ice cream)
- Almás kalács (Hungarian apple pie)
- Puncs szelet (or puncsos kalács, is the Hungarian version of Punschkrapfen)
- Zacher torta (also known as Sachertorte, a chocolate cake of Austrian origin)
- Fekete erdő torta (also known as Black Forest gateau, a cake of German origin, consisting of chocolate, cream and cherry filling)
- Csokoládészalámi (Hungarian version of Chocolate salami, which can be made of both dark or white chocolate. Broken biscuit, almond, peanut, fig, dried fruit, gummy candy is added in the chocolate)
- Mézeskalács (Hungarian Gingerbread which is usually prepared in the winter)
- Habos túrós (translates into foamy curdy, and it has three layers: pie pastry, vanilla curd cheese cream and egg white foam on the top. Typical dessert made for celebrations and festives.)

=== Others ===
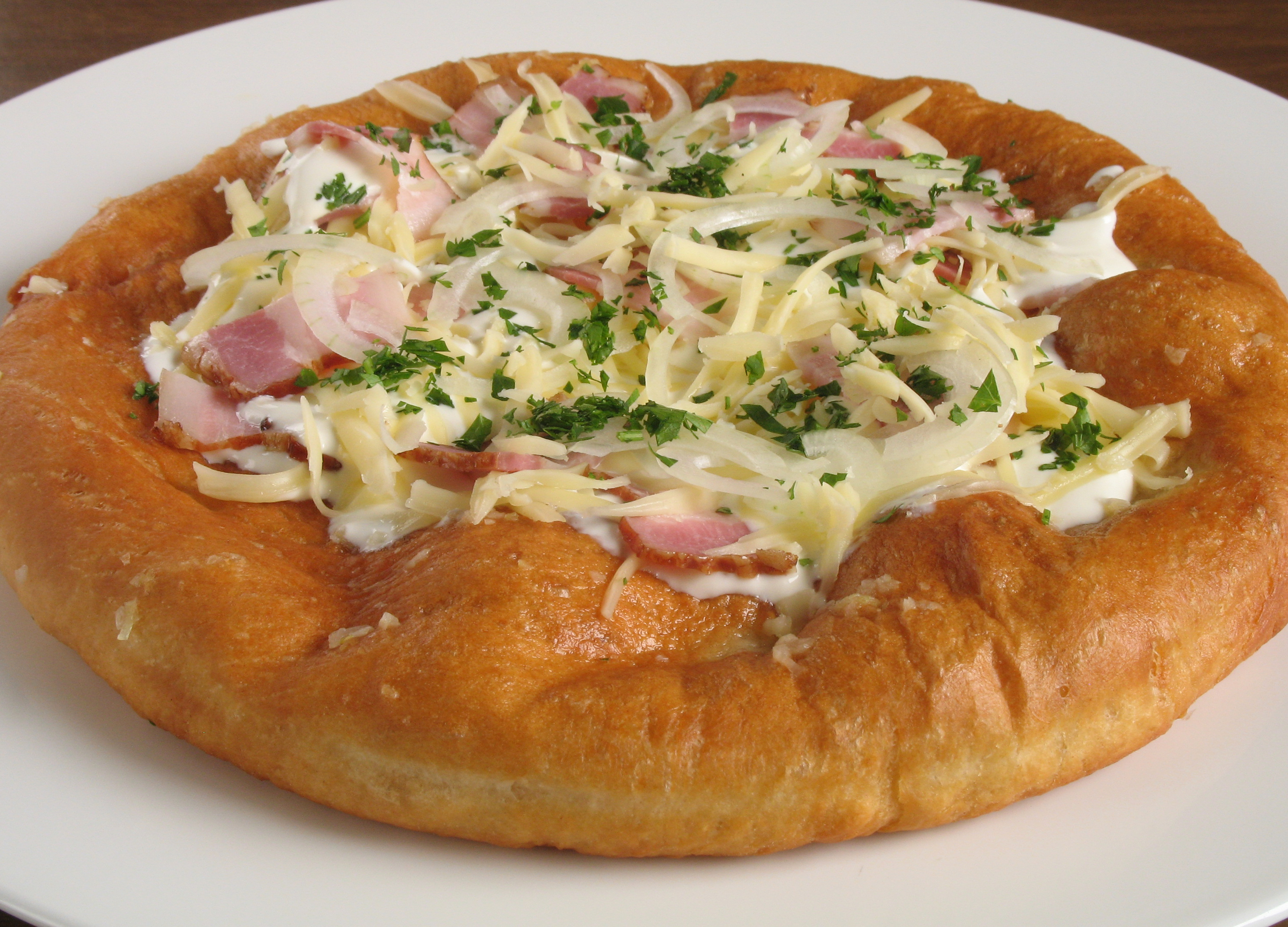
Lángos

- Lángos (fried bread dough)
- Pogácsa (a type of bun, round puffed pastry with bacon, traditionally cooked on the fire)
- Zsemle (round small breads, eaten cut in half, with butter, cold cuts or jam, often for breakfast)
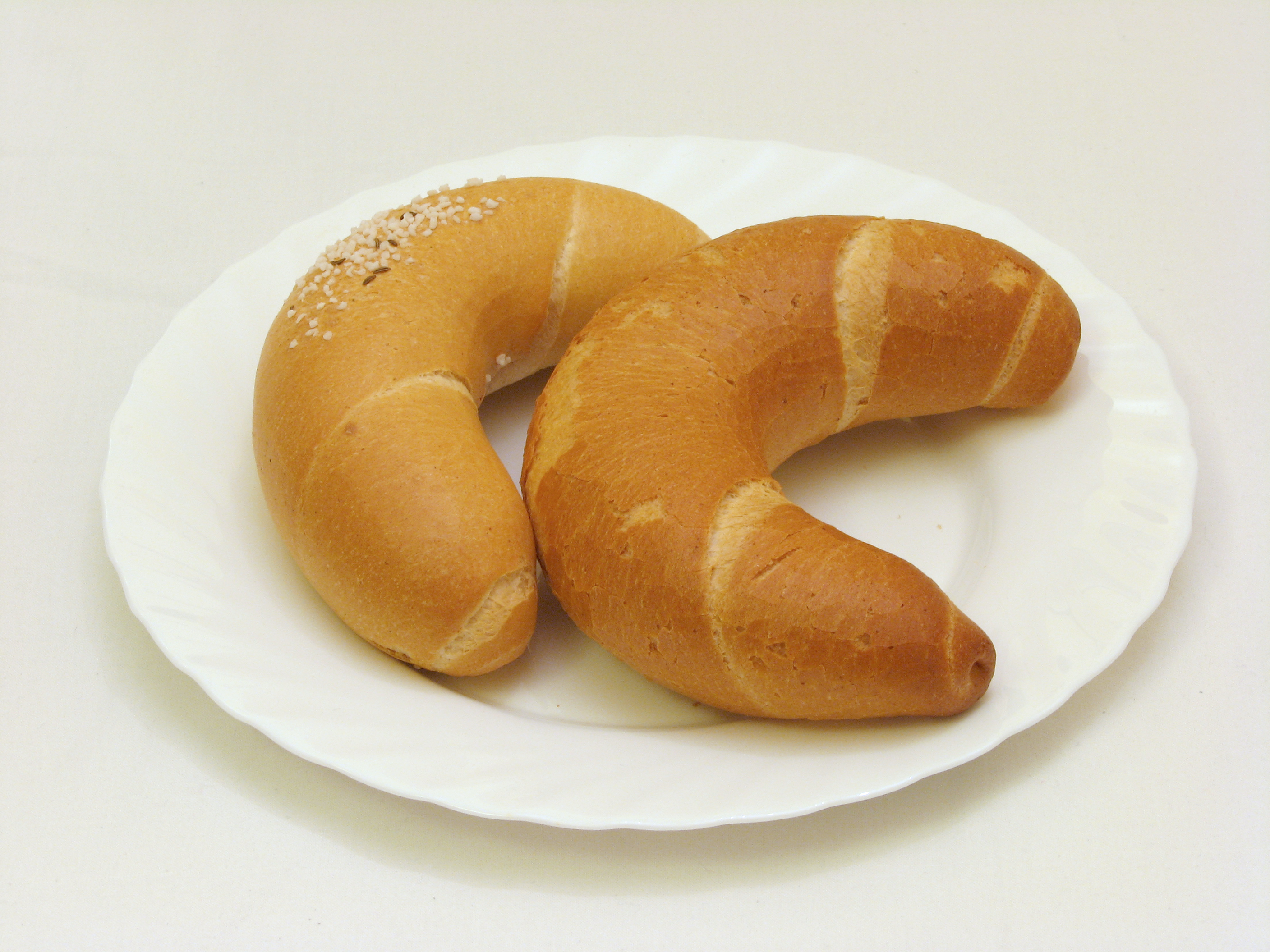
  Kifli, a crescent-shaped bread
- Fánk or Bismarck Doughnuts, typically made for Farsang
- Kifli (crescent-shaped bread. It can be made plain, salted, with seeds or sweet; see picture)
- laska (potato-dough, thicker palacsinta)
- Hókifli (Hungarian traditional Vanillekipferl)
- Sajtoskifli is kifli with cheddar cheese, which usually does not have the crescent shape.
- Dunakavics ("Danube pebbles", a popular Hungarian dragée variety.)
- Perec (Hungarian Pretzel, usually in salted, nutty, and cheese varieties, much softer than its German counterpart.)
- Sajtos tallér (popular cheese flavoured Hungarian snack, similar in shape to lukken cookies. Most people no longer make it at home, but buy it from a shop)
- Diákcsemege (pupil's snack) a traditional mix of nuts, traditionally consisting of raisins, almonds, hazelnuts, peanuts and sunflower seeds(szotyola).
- Keszőce (A dilute sauce made from gooseberries, wild cherries or other fruit)
- Májgaluska (small liver dumplings used in different soups, for example, liverball soup)
- Grízgaluska (Hungarian boiled semolina dumplings used in soup)
- Tarhonya (a kind of large Hungarian "couscous", big pasta grain, served as a side dish; also an ingredient of Tarhonyás hús, meat with egg barley)
- Rizi-bizi (white rice cooked with green peas, served as a side dish)
- Vinetta or padlizsán krém (Transylvanian mashed eggplant salad made of grilled, peeled and finely chopped eggplants)
- Körözött or Liptai túró (cheese spread with ground sweet paprika and onions)
- Libamájpástétom (Hungarian delicacy: foie gras - goose liver pâté)
- Málé (Sweet corn flatbreads. It does not use sweeteners. It is made using the chemical property of the corn, which gives it a sweet taste when baked in a pasta mix of flour and hot water, kept warm for a few hours. To make it work, it was often sung to, in the countryside, "Málé, Málé, just you be sweet...". One of its variants is the Tejes Málé (known in Romania as mălai cu lapte) which is made of milk or soured milk)
- The Kőtes palacsinta (this palacsinta also has the size of the Crêpe, but it's also as thick as American pancakes), and the Pánkó (Szekler doughnut) are traditional foods of the Szeklers of Bukovina.
- Poroja (flat fatty sponge cake of the Banat Hungarians)
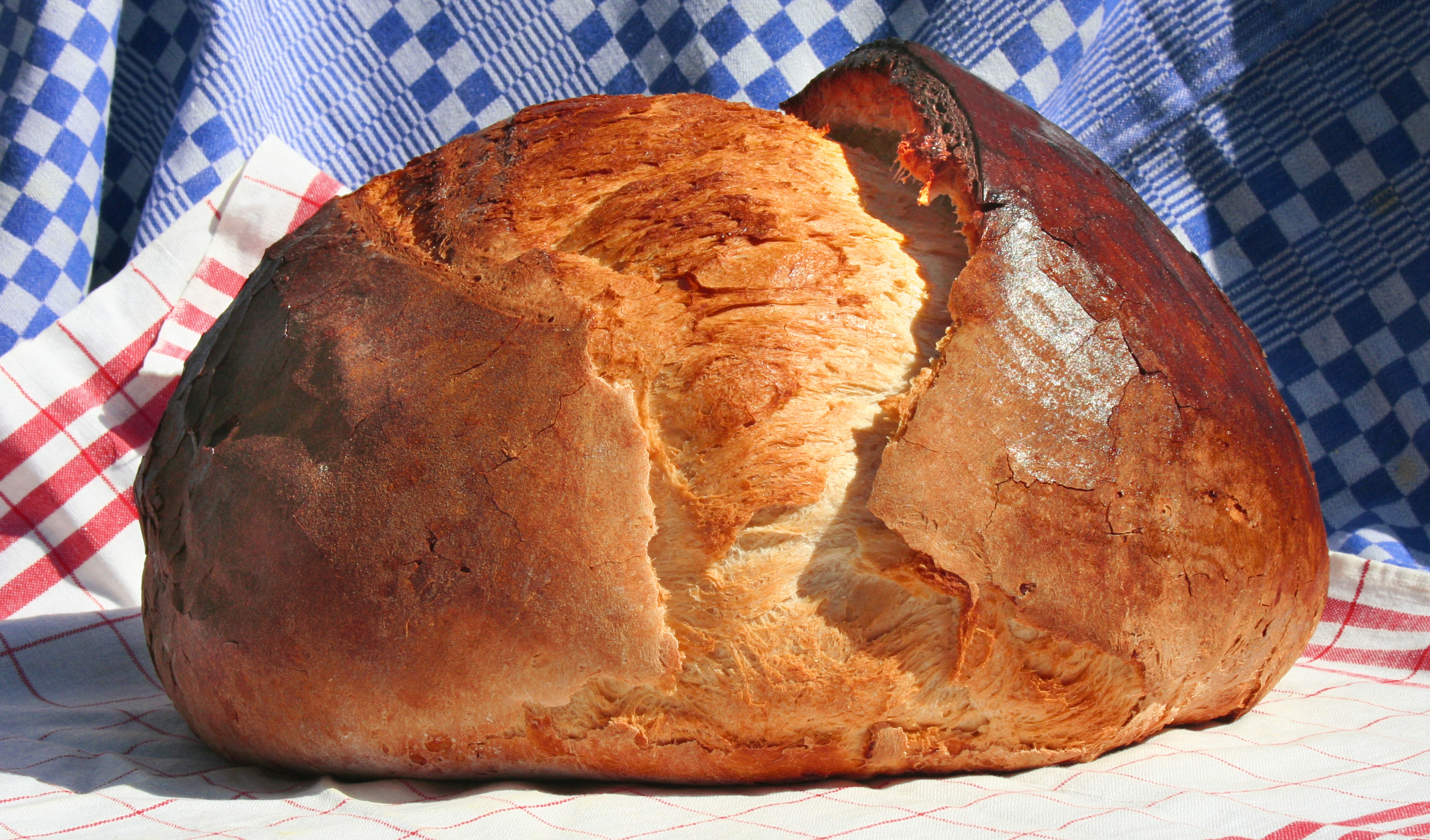
  Hungarian bread. Traditionally Hungarians buy their bread freshly made every second or third day from the local bakery, not in plastic bags or frozen.
- Bundáskenyér (literally "bread with a fur", a savoury French toast or Gypsy toast or bread fritter, a breakfast food or sometimes as a side dish)
- Bread - (The large Hungarian bread that is baked fresh every morning in the bakeries. The traditional form called cipó is the smaller, round and has a hard thick crust. The other bread type is vekni: long loaves with crispy crust, thicker or thinner, like the baguette.)
- Kenyérlángos (smaller piece of bread dough baked in a flat form, often topped with sour cream, bacon and onions; traditionally a snack for children on the day bread was baked at home, now sold mostly on festivals and markets. It's thicker than a lepény, which has similar toppings (cheese, salami, ham, onion, tejföl, tomatoes, chopped meat))

== Drinks ==
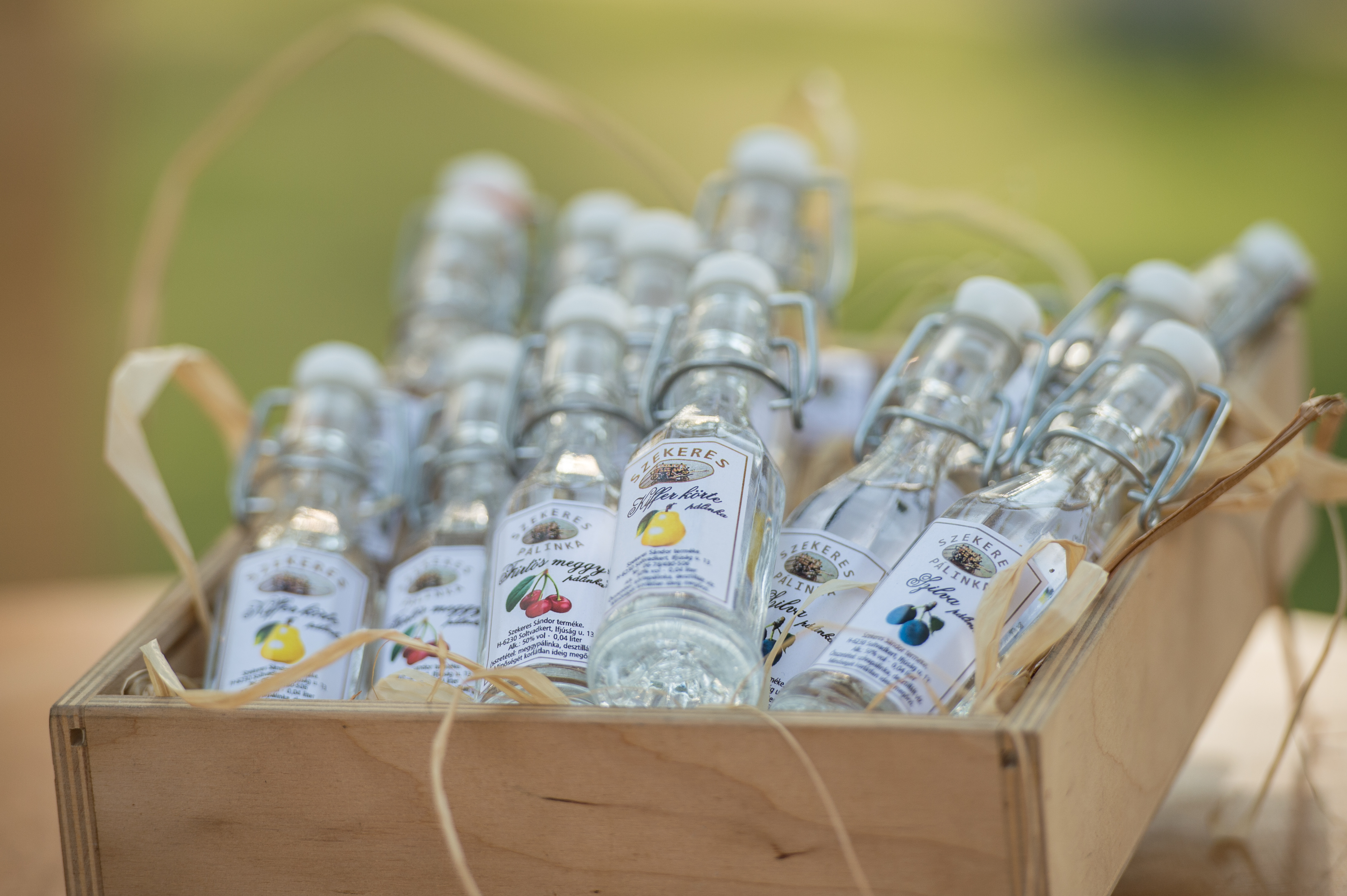
Bottles of cherry, pear, and plum-based pálinka, a traditional Hungarian fruit brandy

Hungarian winemaking predates their settlement in the Carpathian Basin in the early 10th century. The Hungarian tribes brought with them winemaking traditions rooted in the Caucasus and Inner Asia. The Hungarian word for wine, bor, is of Old Turkic origin, comparable to Uyghur bor. However, winemaking in the territory of present-day Hungary dates back to at least the establishment of the Roman province of Pannonia in the 1st century AD, possibly to local Celtic tribes of the 3rd century BC.

The best-known wines are the white dessert wine called Tokaji Aszú (after the North-Eastern region of Hungary, Tokaj) and the red wines from Villány (Southern part of Hungary). Famous is also the wine called Bull's Blood (Egri Bikavér), a dark, full-bodied red wine. Hungarian fruit wines, such as red-currant wine, are mild and soft in taste and texture. A special kind of wine is the Ürmös in which next to the grapes, wormwood is also put into the barrel.

Hungary's most notable liquors are Unicum, a herbal bitters, and Pálinka, a range of fruit brandies (plum, apricot and pear are popular). Also notable are the 21 brands of Hungarian mineral waters (for example, Apenta and Kékkúti). Some of them have therapeutic value, such as Mira.

The elderberry (bodza), currant, wild strawberry (szamóca), viola (plant) (ibolya), lavender and raspberry (málna) szörp (a concentrate created from sugar and fruits or flowers) is also common. The Jaffa flavoured Szobi szörp was an iconic soft drink before the change of regime. Traubi or Traubisoda, is another soft drink based on an Austrian license produced in Balatonvilágos since 1971.

== See also ==
- List of Hungarian dishes
- List of restaurants in Hungary
- Hungarian Food Safety Office
- Ottoman cuisine
- National symbols of Hungary
