= Paprika =

Spice made from red peppers

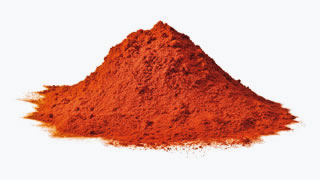
- Mallorcan pimentón tap de cortí paprika
- Food energy (per 100 g serving): 282 kcal (1,180 kJ)
Nutritional value
(per 100 g serving)
- Protein: 14 g
- Fat: 13 g
- Carbohydrate: 54 g

Paprika (Note: (/pəˈpriːkə/ pə-pree-kə, US also /pæˈprikə/ pap-REE-kə, UK also /ˈpæprɪkə/ PAP-rik-ə)) is a spice made from dried and ground red peppers, Capsicum annuum. It is traditionally made from Capsicum annuum varietals in the Longum group, and while it can have varying levels of heat, the peppers used tend to be milder and have thinner flesh than those used to produce chili powder. The milder, sweet paprika is mainly composed of the fruit of the pepper with most of the seeds removed; whereas some seeds and stalks are retained in the peppers used for hotter paprika.

Paprika, like all capsicum varieties and their derivatives, is descended from wild ancestors from the Amazon River, cultivated in ancient times in South, Central and North America, particularly in central Mexico. The peppers were introduced to Western Europe via Spain and Portugal in the 16th century. The trade in paprika expanded from the Iberian Peninsula to Africa and Asia and ultimately reached the Balkans via the Ottoman Empire, from which it spread throughout Central and Eastern Europe.

In Europe, paprika is a frequent and major ingredient in the cuisines of Hungary, Serbia, North Macedonia, Spain and Portugal. It is widely used in the Middle East, especially in Turkey, and in North Africa.

== History ==
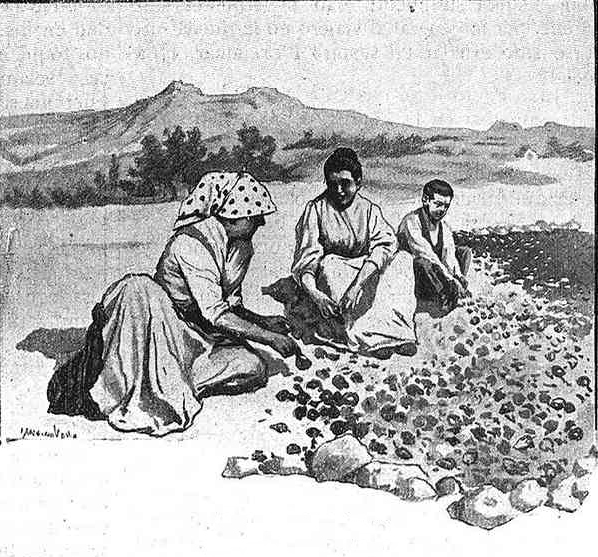
Opening the pepper, an illustration of Medina Vera

Paprika is a spice made from dried and powdered red peppers, and while the modern spice is usually made from European varieties of Capsicum annuum in the Longum group, Capsicum annuum itself is native to northern regions of South America and to southwestern North America. Peppers were being gathered and eaten in Mexico c.7000 BC, and were cultivated before 3500 BC. The food writer Alan Davidson comments that Christopher Columbus probably came across them on his first voyage in 1492, and may have brought plants back to Europe. The Spaniards and Portuguese also took them to India and south-east Asia and they were quickly taken up and grown in the Middle East, the Balkans and Europe – to Italy by 1526, Germany by 1543 and known in Hungary by 1569.

Paprika was also taken up in the Ottoman Empire, which for much of the 16th and 17th centuries, ruled the central region of Hungary. Industrialized production of paprika started near the end of the 17th century and grew to be highly developed by the 18th century. The long period of Turkish presence introduced several foodstuffs to the region, including filo pastry (which evolved into the strudel), pilafs, pita bread and paprika. The plant used to make the Hungarian version of the spice was first grown in 1569. Central European paprika was hot until the 1920s, when a Szeged breeder found a plant that produced sweet fruit, which he grafted onto other plants. According to George Lang in his Cuisine of Hungary (1994), the earliest reference to paprika peppers in a Hungarian dictionary was in 1604, when the name used was Török-bors (Turkish pepper). The name "paprika" did not come into currency in Hungary until 1775, when J. Csapé, in his Herbarium, called it "paprika garden pepper".

The first recorded use of the word paprika in English is from 1830. The Times mentioned "A' borsos levecskét – the pepper soup, or paprika soup, made of the capsicum annuum of Linne ... a favourite dish among the Magyars, Turks, and Servians". In Spices, Salt and Aromatics in the English Kitchen (1970), Elizabeth David notes that in cookery books of the Edwardian era, paprika is sometimes referred to as "Krona pepper".

== Etymology ==
The word "paprika" is from Hungarian paprika, a diminutive from Serbo-Croatian papar (pepper), which in turn was derived from the Latin piper or modern Greek piperi. "Paprika" and similar words, including "peperke", "piperke" and "paparka", are used in various languages for peppers.

Paprika (and similar words such as peperke, piperke and paparka) are used in various languages and regional varieties of English to refer to the plant and the fruit from which the spice is made, as well as to peppers in the Grossum group such as bell peppers.

== Varieties ==
Paprika can have varying levels of heat, but the chili peppers used for hot paprika tend to be milder and have thinner flesh than those used to produce chili powder. Sweet paprika is mostly composed of the pericarp, with more than half of the seeds removed; hot paprika contains some seeds, stalks, ovules and calyces. Whether paprika is red, orange, or yellow depends on its mix of carotenoids. Yellow-orange shades of paprika derive primarily from α-carotene and β-carotene (provitamin A compounds), zeaxanthin, lutein and β-cryptoxanthin; reds derive from capsanthin and capsorubin. One study found high concentrations of zeaxanthin in orange paprika. The same study found that orange paprika contains much more lutein than red or yellow paprika. Other studies have found that yellow paprika powder exhibits a significantly higher antioxidant capacity than other varieties of paprika. Paprika peppers also have several shape varieties, such as blocky, mini, and conical.

== Production ==
Paprika is commonly produced by sun drying the peppers, a process that can take up to 10 days in optimal conditions. In addition to drying method, pepper cultivar and duration of storage also affect paprika color qualities.

China and India, which together account for more than 22 million tonnes of paprika annually, are major producers, with Hungary and Spain also having significant production.

=== Hungary ===
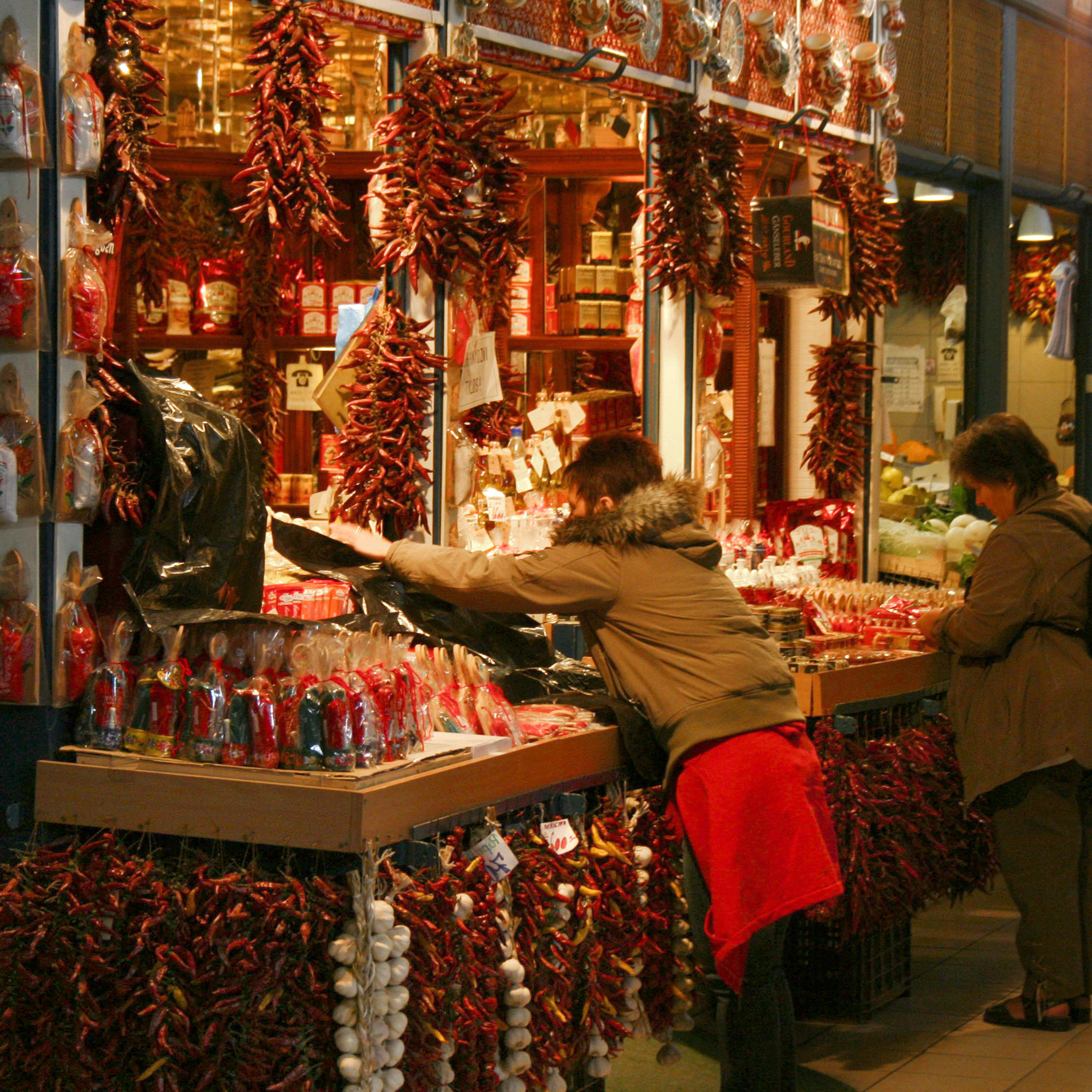
Hungarian paprika vendor in the Budapest Great Market Hall

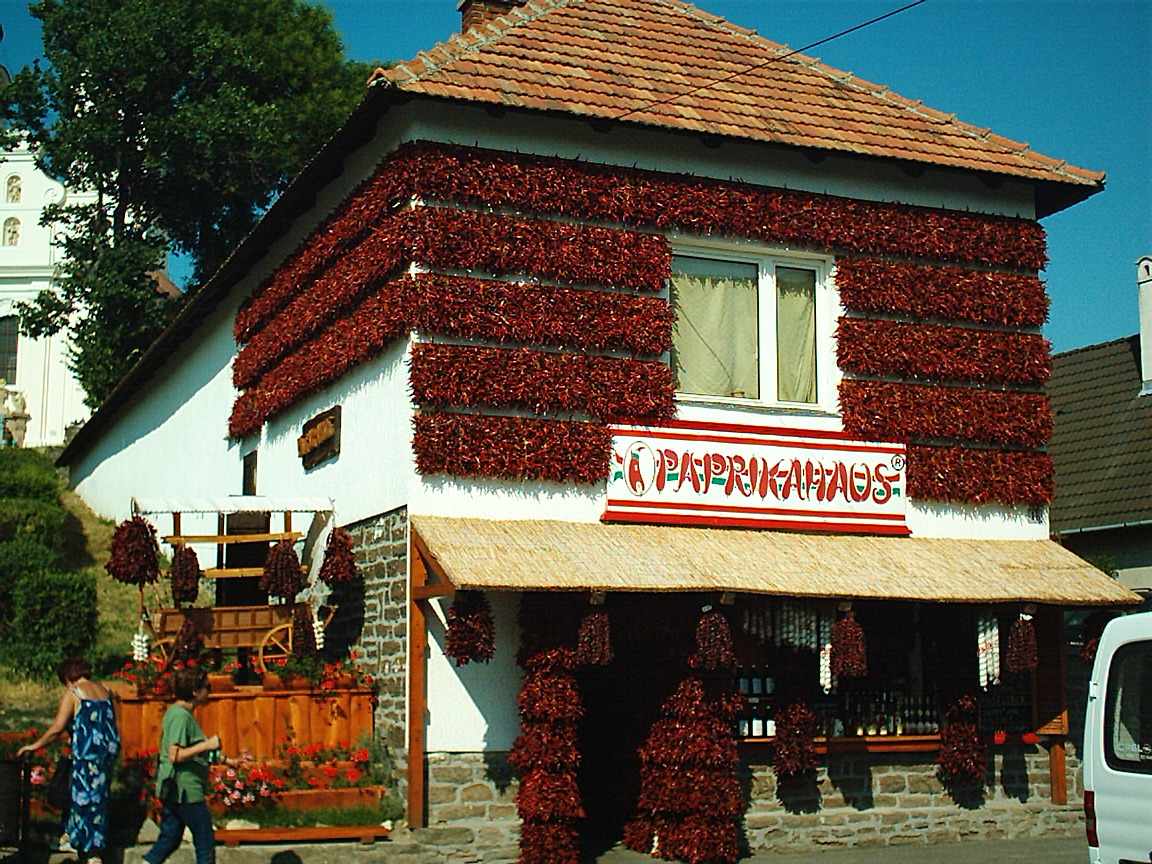
The Tihany Paprikaház, a paprika museum in Hungary

Hungary is a major source of paprika, and it is the spice most closely associated with Hungary.

The five commercial grades of Hungarian paprika, ranked by quality, are:

- különleges – exquisite, delicate
- édesnemes – delicate, sweet-noble
- félédes – semi-sweet
- rózsa – rose
- erős – hot

The two principal growing areas in Hungary are in the south of the country, one around the city of Szeged and the other in Kalocsa, on the Danube.

=== Spain ===
Pimentón is a powdered spice produced in Spain from the small round fruits of several varieties of capsicum annuum. According to the Oxford Companion to Food:

it may reasonably be regarded as a Spanish version of paprika: it is almost sweet in taste and it is used both as a colouring agent and as a spice in itself. It is added to seafood, sausages, rice, and many other savoury dishes.

There are three versions of Spanish paprika: mild (pimentón dulce), mildly spicy (pimentón agridulce) and spicy (pimentón picante). The most common, pimentón de la Vera, has a distinct smoky taste and smell, as it is dried by smoking, typically using oak wood. Currently, according to the Denomination of Origin Regulation Council (Consejo Regulador de la DOP "Pimentón de La Vera"), the crop of La Vera paprika covers around 1,500 hectares (3,700 acres) and has an annual production of 4.5 million kg (5,000 short tons), certified as Denomination of Origin. Pimentón de Murcia is an unsmoked variety made with bola/ñora peppers and traditionally dried in the sun or in kilns.

== Use ==
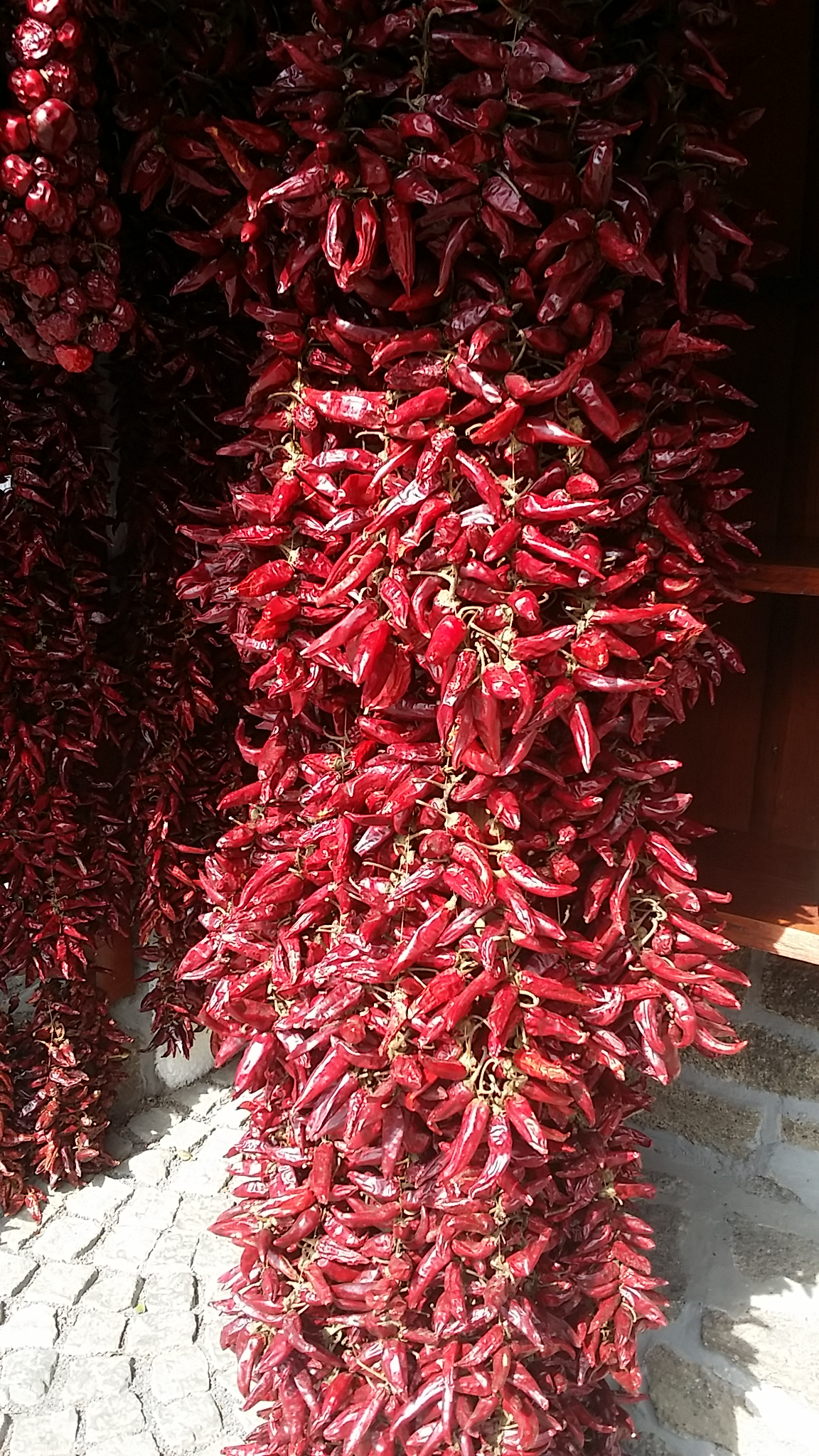
In Hungary this traditional food is called veresbors; the pepper itself is called fűszerpaprika.

Paprika is used as an ingredient throughout the world in dishes such as rice, stews and soups and in the preparation of sausages, mixed with meats and other spices.

=== Hungary ===
Hungary's best-known national dishes both incorporate paprika: a meat soup, gulyás, and a stew internationally known as goulash but called in Hungary pörkölt, porkélt or paprikás. Paprikash, a sauce combining paprika, onions and sour cream, is used in chicken and veal dishes and with savoury crèpes. David comments on paprika:

Unending arguments as to which is best for what kind of goulash or other central European speciality are a Hungarian pastime; don’t ever ask a Hungarian food expert to tell you about paprika unless you are prepared to hear more about the subject than you want to know. ... It is a spice which could be useful, since it is mild and sweet, but it keeps badly. (Note: Craig Claiborne agrees that paprika does not keep well and comments that the best way to check its freshness "is by its colour. A spice like paprika or cayenne pepper is bright red when it is freshest. Later it takes on a dull and brownish look.")

In a 2016 study Zsuzsa Gille writes that paprika is:

... in practically every Hungarian dish, such as in the roux of the various pörkölts, paprikashes and goulashes; they sprinkle it on sandwiches, omelettes and soups. On restaurant tables, the customary salt and pepper shakers are usually accompanied by one full of paprika.

=== Spain and Portugal ===
In Spanish cuisine, paprika is an essential ingredient of chorizo pork sausages. In contrast to the less well-known chorizo from the French side of the Pyrenees, which is traditionally spiced with piment d'Espelette, Spanish chorizos are spiced with pimentón. The sausage may be mild or spicy depending on the type of paprika used. Valencian paella uses both paprika and saffron in the mix of rice, meat and vegetables. Paprika features in Basque cuisine. David instances Moules au riz à la Basquaise (mussels with spiced rice, Basque style) and Faisan au riz Basquais (pheasant with spiced rice). In sofrito, the aromatic mixture of diced vegetables used as the basis of many stews and casseroles, Spanish cooks typically add paprika to the mix.

In Portuguese cuisine, where it is known as colorau, paprika plays an important part. It accounts for the orange shade and piquant taste of many of Portugal's pork and poultry dishes, and is similar to a hot Hungarian paprika. Paprika is also much used in fish dishes including eels, cuttlefish and the mixed fish stew caldeirada. It deepens the shade of some Portuguese cheeses, and adds spice to the local equivalent of chorizo, chouriço.

=== France ===
Paprika plays a part in French cuisine. In their Mastering the Art of French Cooking, Simone Beck, Louisette Bertholle and Julia Child give recipes for fricassée de poulet au paprika (chicken fricassee with paprika) and suprêmes de volaille Archiduc (chicken breasts with paprika, onions and cream). Some French dishes featuring paprika as an important ingredient are called "hongroise" (Hungarian). Most of them use sauce hongroise – chopped onions cooked with paprika and white wine – and generally have cream added to the cooked sauce. They include potage de haricots hongroise (bean and bacon soup with paprika and sour cream), anguille hongroise (eel), pieds de veau à la hongroise (calves' feet), oeufs hongroise (hard-boiled eggs), grenouilles hongroise (frogs' legs), homard hongroise (lobster), sole hongroise, turbot hongroise and escalope de veau hongroise. Pommes de terre hongroise – Hungarian potatoes – consist of large rounds of potatoes, with chopped onions, cooked in butter and paprika, with diced tomatoes and moistened with consommé. Rouille, a French sauce with paprika and garlic, is traditionally served with bouillabaisse.

=== Germany and Austria ===
In German cookery, paprika is used in many dishes, from fish stews to braised duck, casseroled hare, braised veal, fried goose liver, stuffed cabbage leaves, meat dumplings, and beef goulash (known in German as Rindergulasch). According to the chef Rick Stein, "The people of Vienna love goulash so much they’ve taken the Hungarian dish and made it their own. The secret is to use lots of onion". The recipe calls for both sweet and hot paprika.

=== Other cuisines ===
In Moroccan cuisine, paprika (tahmira) is much used in dishes such as bissara and chermoula. In Arabian food paprika is an ingredient of the spice mix Baharat. Throughout the Middle East, paprika may be sprinked onto hummus just before it is served, and it is frequently used to garnish baba ghanoush.

Paprika is little used in Italian cuisine. The Friuli region in the north-east, a former part of the Austro-Hungarian Empire, features a spread called Liptauer, in which salted anchovies are mixed with ricotta, butter, paprika, chopped onion and other ingredients, and further south, in Molise, paprika is used in the salami ventricina. Unlike the Spanish sofrito, Italian soffritto typically uses garlic rather than paprika.

== Gallery ==
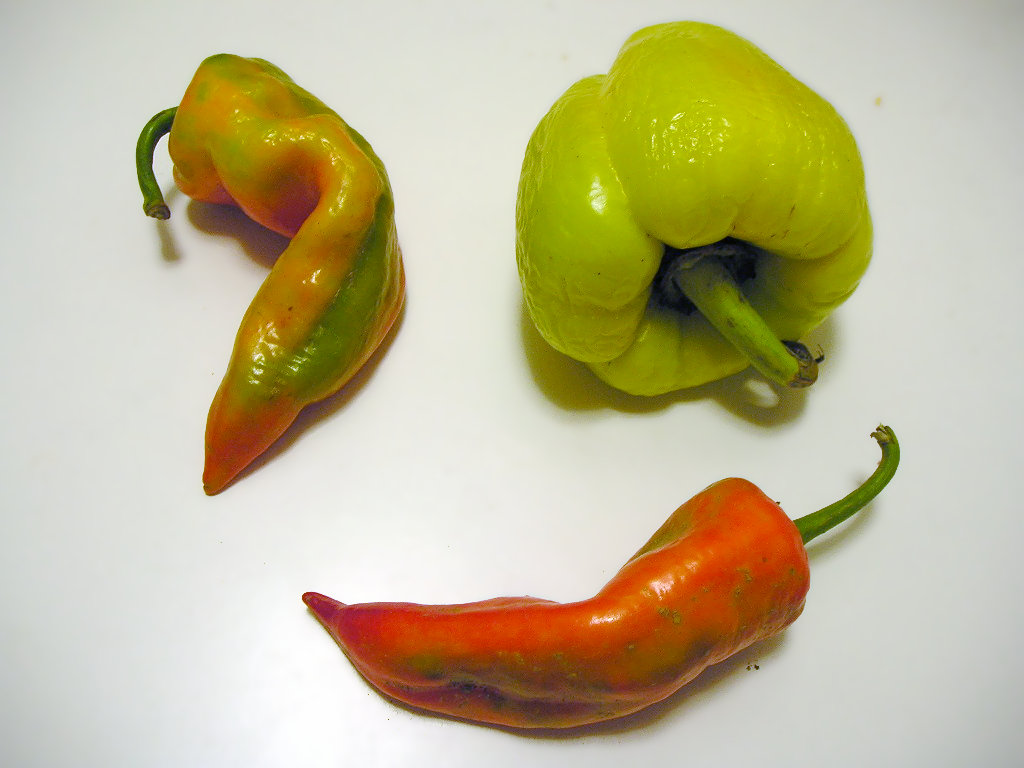
There are various peppers which are called paprika in Hungarian but aren't used for the spice production.

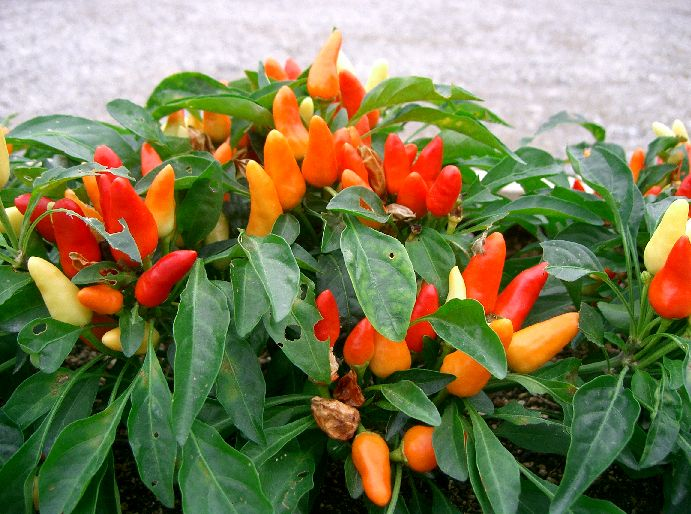
A Capsicum annuum plant, with fruit of varied ripeness.

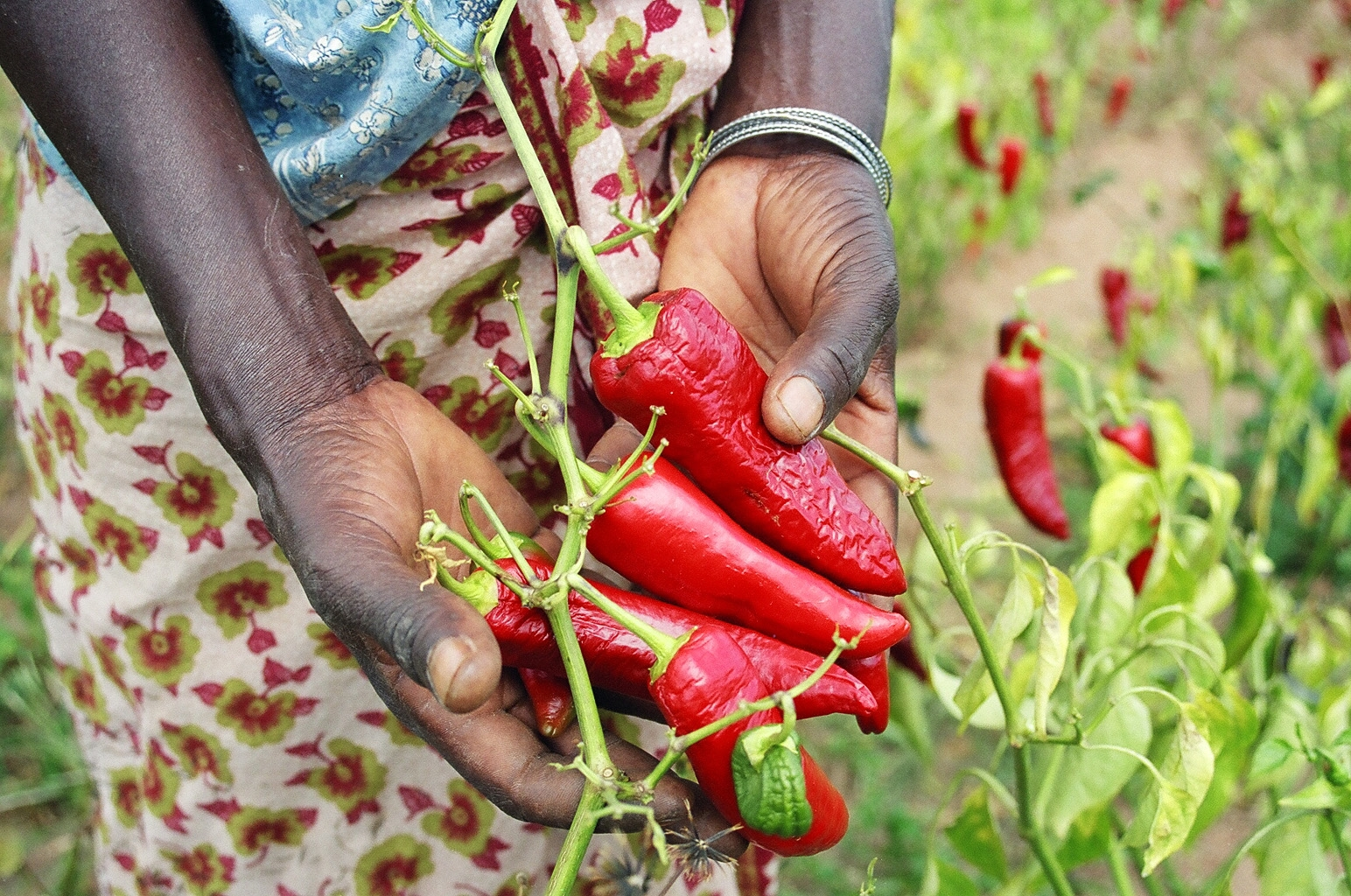
Paprika pepper farmer in Tanzania

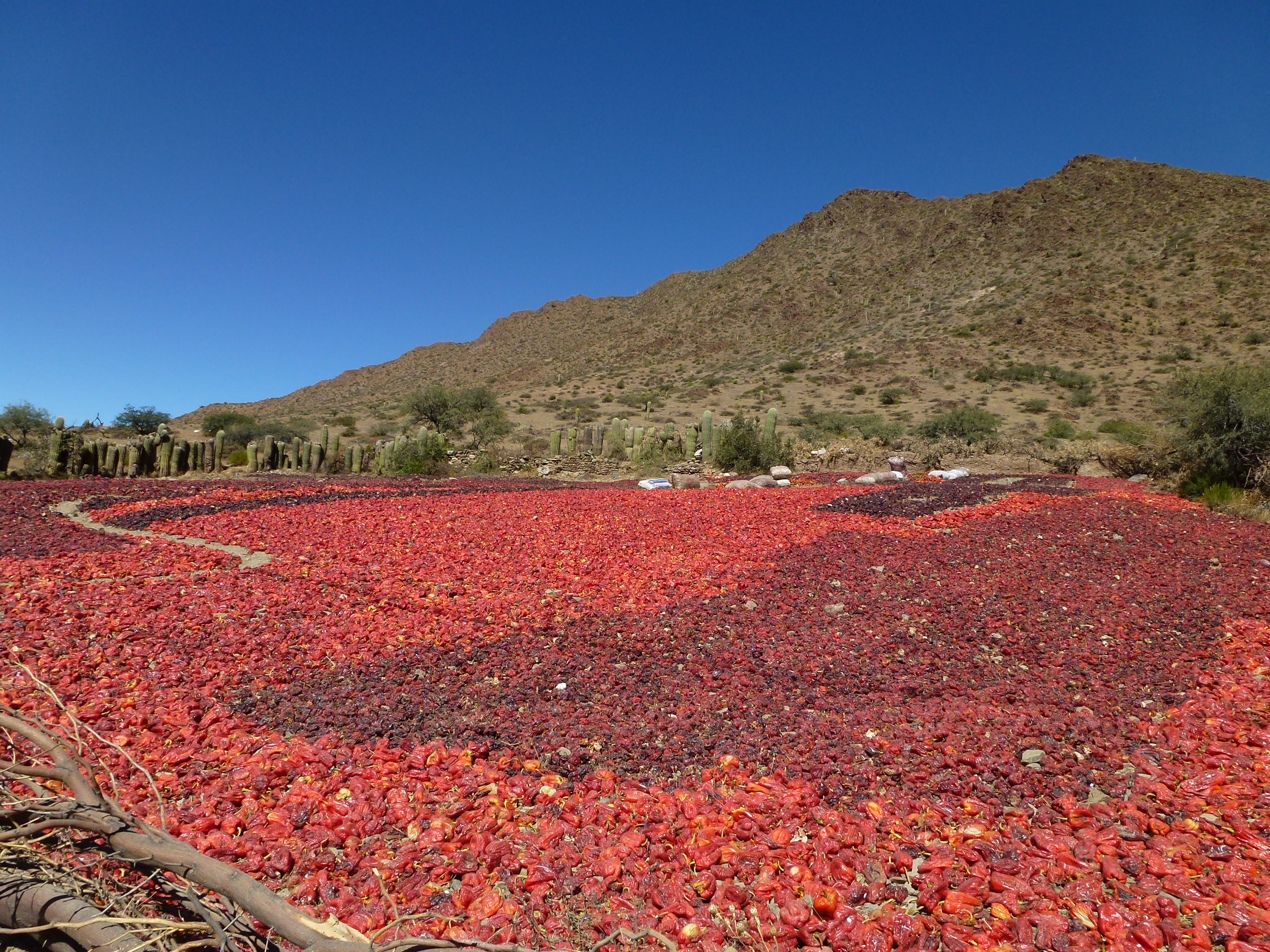
Red peppers in Cachi, Argentina are air-dried before being processed into powder.

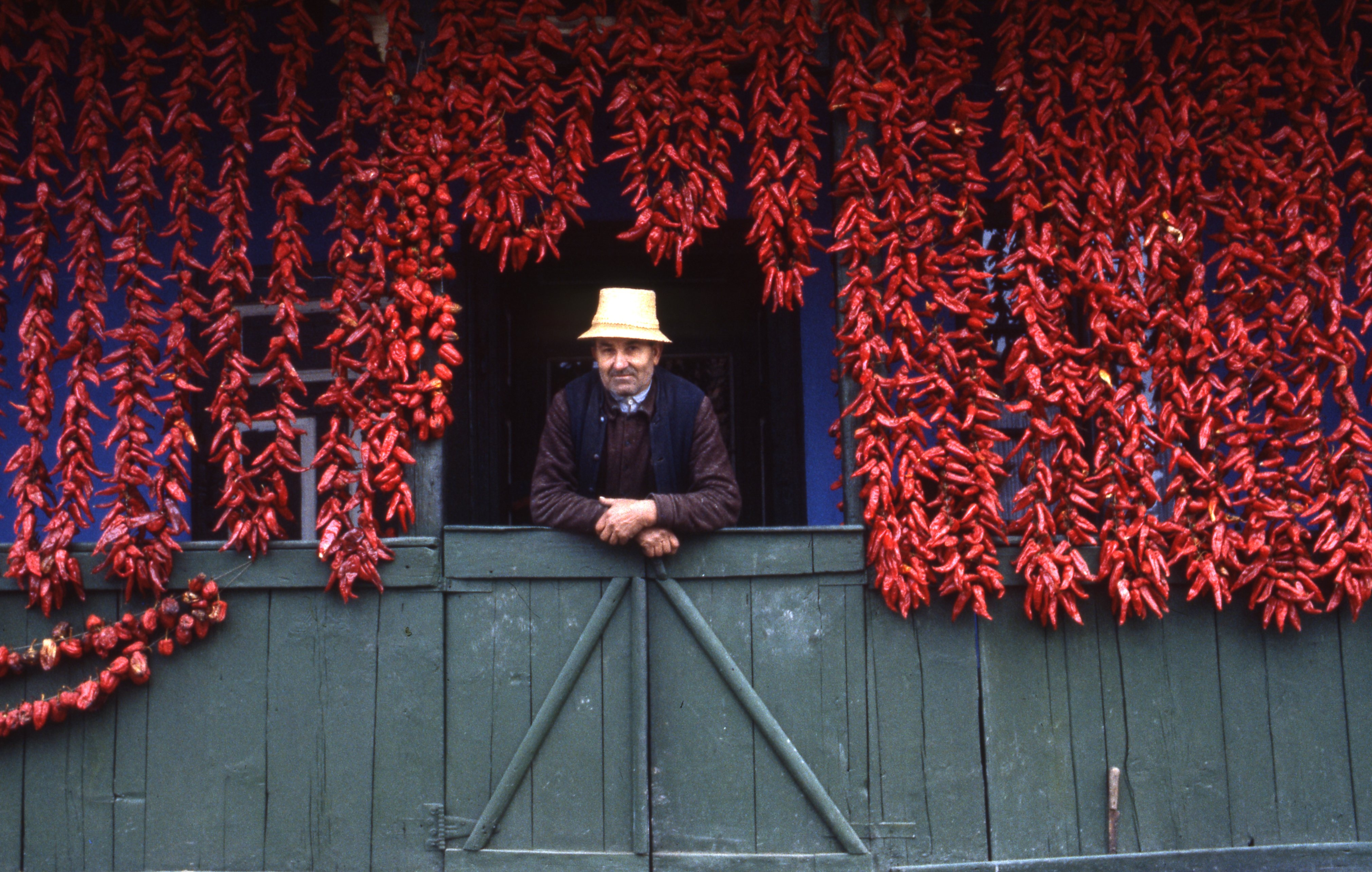
A man surrounded by drying peppers in Transylvania

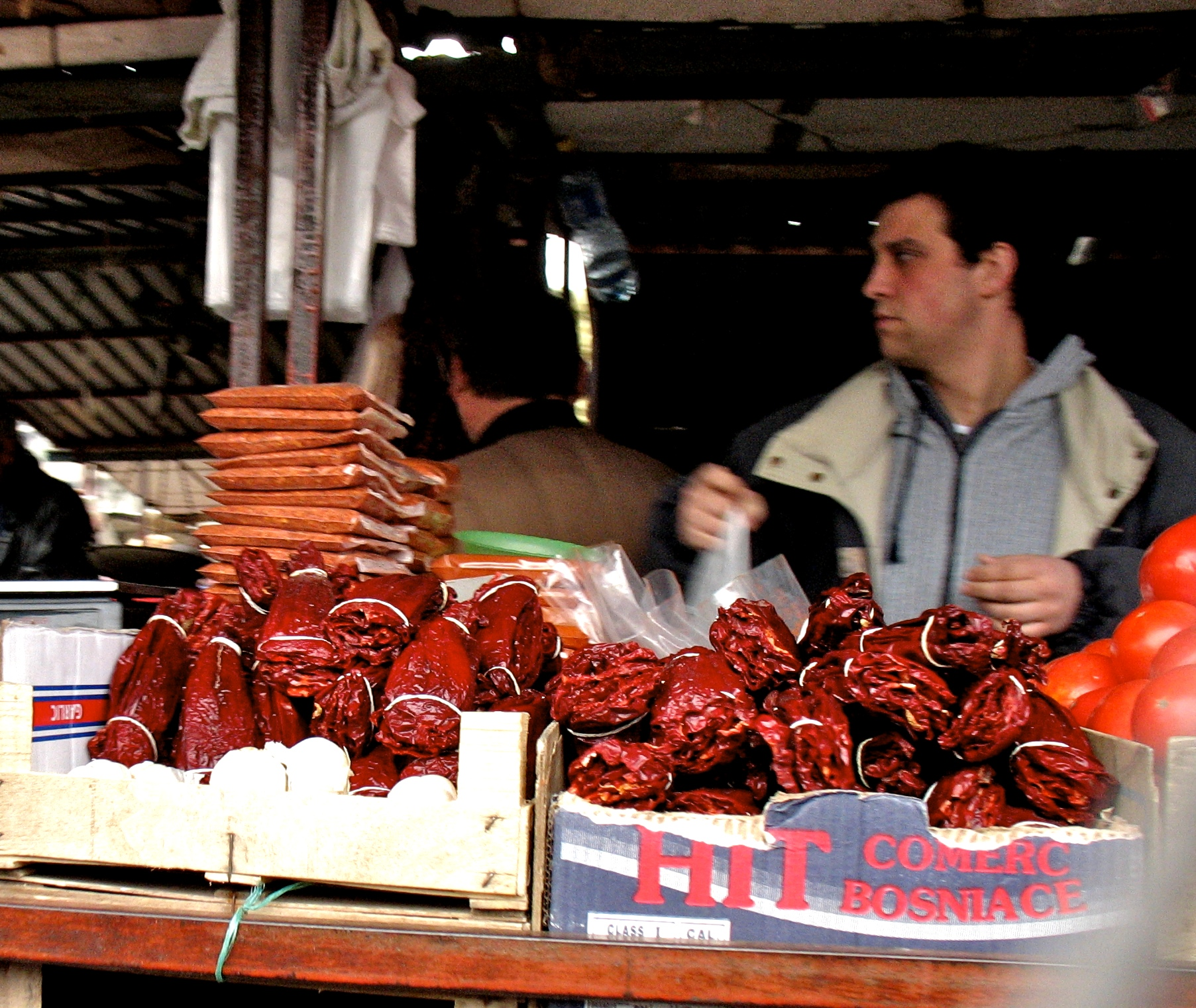
Packaged ground and whole dried paprika for sale at a marketplace in Belgrade, Serbia

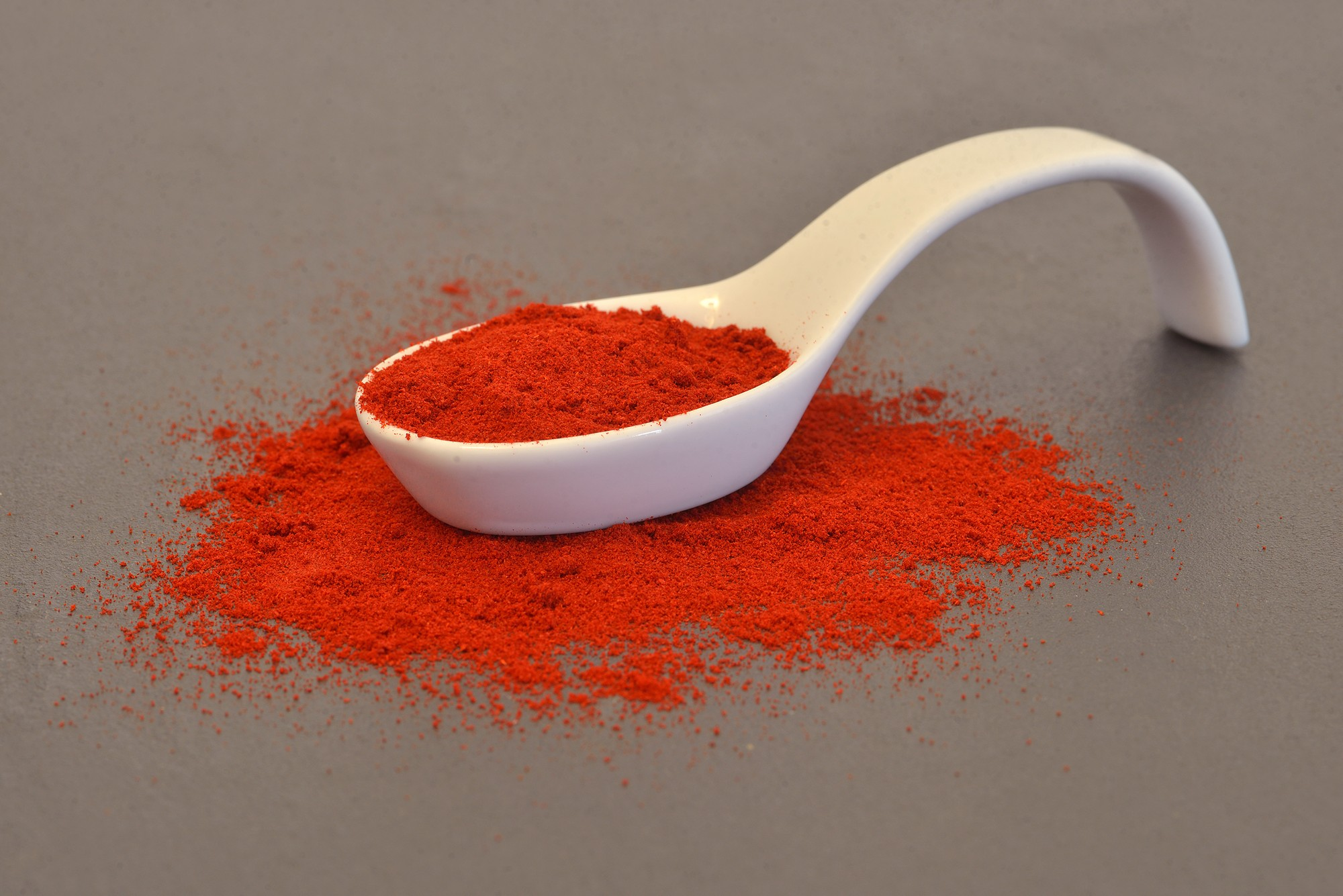
Smoked paprika, called pimentón in Spanish

== See also ==
- Ajvar
- Cayenne pepper
- Chili powder
- Crushed red pepper
- Food powder
- List of Capsicum cultivars
- List of smoked foods
- Paprika Tap de Cortí
- Pimiento
- Gochugaru

== Sources ==
- Anderson, Jean (1987). The Food of Portugal. London: Hale. ISBN 978-0-70-903054-6.
- Andrews, Jean (1995). Peppers: The Domesticated Capsicums. Austin: University of Texas Press. ISBN 978-0-29-270467-1.
- Beck, Simone; Louisette Bertholle; Julia Child (2012) [1961]. Mastering the Art of French Cooking, Volume One. London: Particular. ISBN 978-0-241-95339-6.
- Bickel, Walter (1989). Hering's Dictionary of Classical and Modern Cookery (eleventh ed.). London: Virtue. ISBN 978-3-8057-0307-9.
- Chirinian, Linda (1987). Secrets of Cooking: Armenian, Lebanese, Persian. New Canaan: Lionhart. ISBN 0-9617033-0-X.
- Claiborne, Craig (1973). A Kitchen Primer. London: Penguin. ISBN 0-14-046172-8.
- Cunha, Rosa Maria; Helena Raposo (1992). Traditional Portuguese Cooking and Typical Sweets (Third ed.). Lisbon: Distribuidora Editora Três. ISBN 978-9-72-917801-6.
- David, Elizabeth (2000) [1970]. Spices, Salt and Aromatics in the English Kitchen. London: Grub Street. ISBN 978-1-902304-66-3.
- David, Elizabeth (2008) [1960]. French Provincial Cooking. London: Folio Society. OCLC 809349711.
- Davidson, Alan (1999). Alan Davidson (ed.). The Oxford Companion to Food. Oxford: Oxford University Press. ISBN 978-0-19-211579-9.
- Gille, Zsuzsa (2016). Paprika, Foie Gras, and Red Mud: The Politics of Materiality in the European Union. Bloomington: Indiana University Press. ISBN 978-0-253-01938-7.
- Hargitai, György (2001). Hungarian Cuisine. Budapest: Média Nova. ISBN 963-00-7408-7.
- Hirigoyen, Gerald (1999). The Basque Kitchen. London: Harper Collins. ISBN 0-06-757461-0.
- Howe, Robin (1983). German Cooking. London: André Deutsch. ISBN 0-23-397583-7.
- Gundel, Karoly (1992). Gundel's Hungarian Cookbook. Budapest: Corvina. ISBN 963-13-3600-X.
- Lang, George (1994). George Lang's Cuisine of Hungary. New York: Wings Books. ISBN 0-51-711868-8.
- Malinowski, Ruth (1978). German Cooking. New York: Weathervane Books. OCLC 1413385831.
- Riley, Gillian (2009). The Oxford Companion to Italian Food. Oxford: Oxford University Press. ISBN 978-0-19-538710-0.
- Sasvari, Joanne (2005). Paprika: A Spicy Memoir from Hungary. Toronto: CanWest Books. ISBN 978-1-89-722905-7.
- Saulnier, Louis (1978) [1923]. Le répertoire de la cuisine (fourteenth ed.). London: Jaeggi. OCLC 1086737491.
- Schmaeling, Tony (1984). German Traditional Cooking. Ware: Omega. ISBN 0-90-785305-6.
- Szathmary, Louis (1999). "Goulash". In Alan Davidson (ed.). The Oxford Companion to Food. Oxford: Oxford University Press. ISBN 978-0-19-211579-9.
- Thompson, Renée (2013). Moroccan. London: New Holland. ISBN 978-1-74-257389-2.
