= Pörkölt =

Hungarian stew

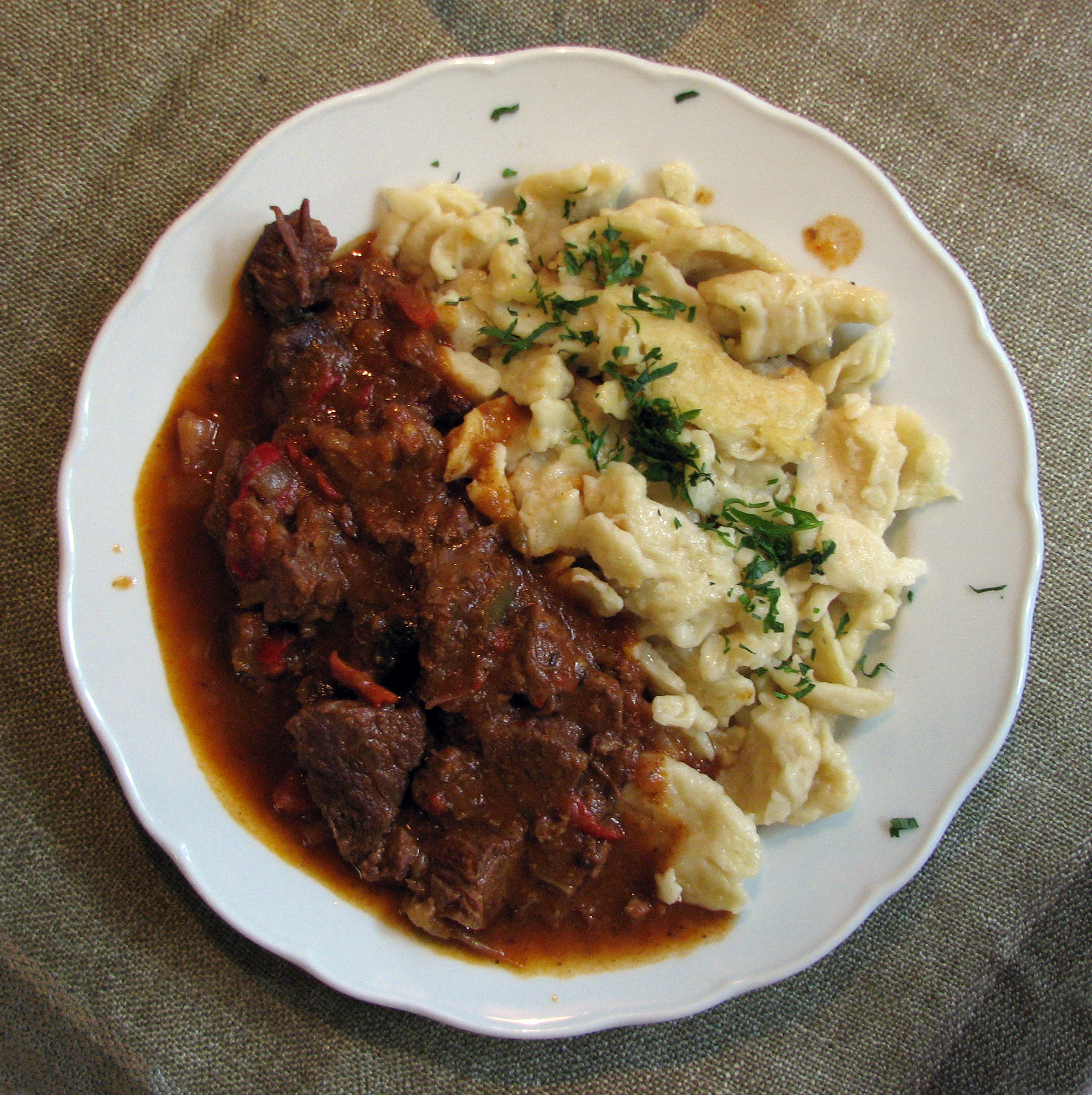
- Hungarian style beef stew with dumplings
- Type: Stew
- Place of origin: Hungary
- Main ingredients: Meat, paprika, onion
- Ingredients generally used: Vegetables

Pörkölt (Hungarian: [ˈpørkølt]) is a meat stew originating in Hungary. It is popular in Hungary as well as Croatia, Romania, Serbia and Slovakia.

== In Hungary ==
Pörkölt is a Hungarian stew with boneless meat, paprika, and some vegetables. It should not be confused with gulyás, a stew with more gravy or a soup (using meat with bones, paprika, caraway, vegetables and potato or different tiny dumplings or pasta simmered along with the meat), or paprikás, which uses only meat, paprika and thick heavy sour cream). Pörkölt, paprikás and gulyás are considered national dishes of Hungary.

There are different pörkölt variations from region to region. In most parts of Hungary, pörkölt is made with beef or pork. The word pörkölt means 'roasted'. Pörkölt is made of meat, onion, and sweet paprika powder. Tomatoes or tomato paste, green pepper, marjoram, and garlic are common additions to the basic recipe.

If no paprika powder is available, a mild or heatless chili powder is a suitable substitute but may slightly alter the character of the dish.

Any kind of meat can be used when making pörkölt. Most common are beef, lamb, chicken, and pork, but game, tripe and liver can also be used. A variant of pörkölt, called pacalpörkölt, is prepared using tripe. Another variation is gombapörkölt, which has mushrooms in it instead of meat.

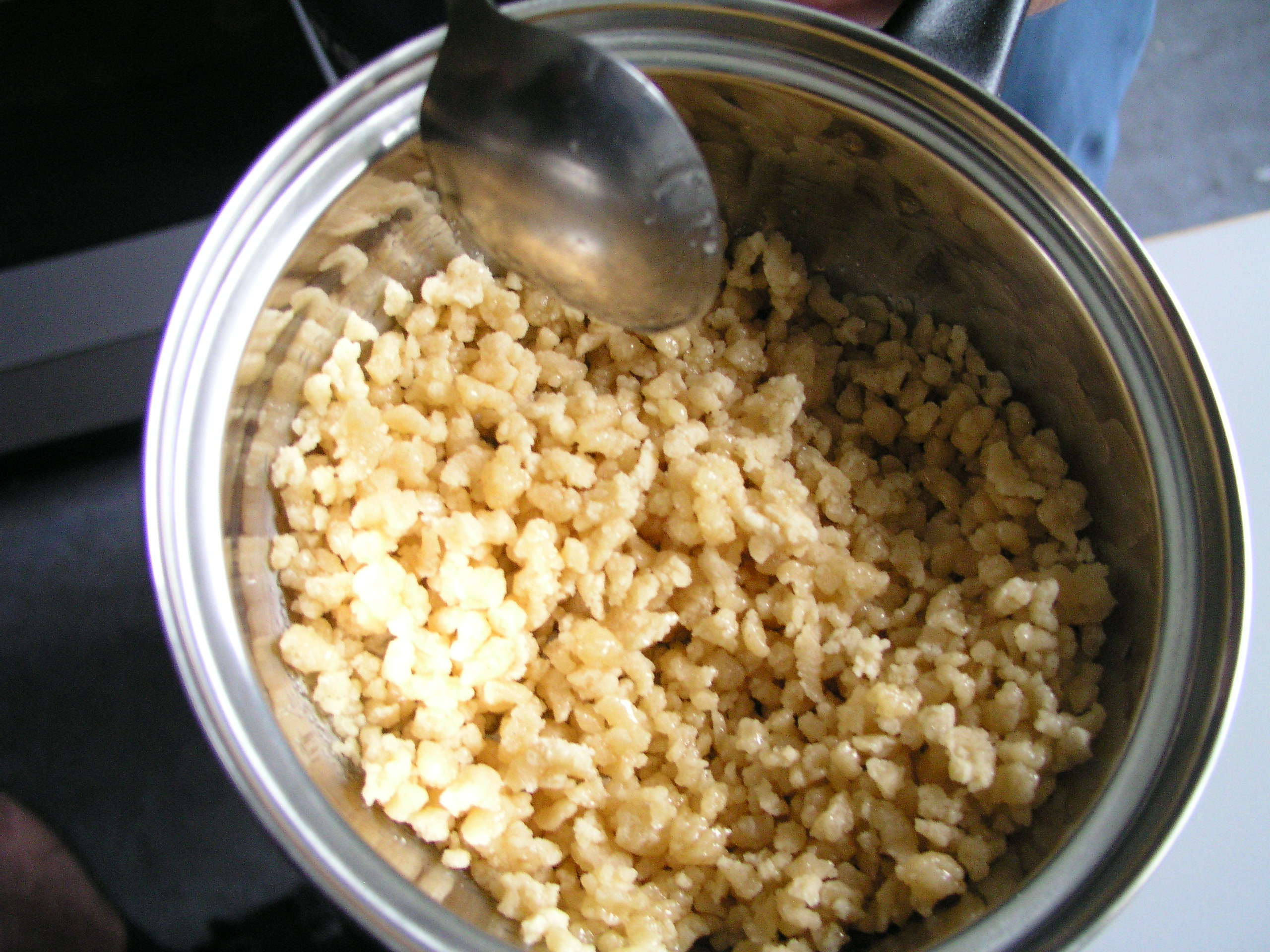
Nokedli used as side dish

Much of the quality of a pot of pörkölt is found in the use of the very few ingredients. The spiciness and the taste of the paprika powder used is very important to the taste.

A simple Hungarian trick for making good pörkölt is first frying the onions in lard or oil, before making anything else. Then set aside the pot and immediately add paprika powder and the meat and "stir-fry" (this is the origin of the verb pörkölni – 'to roast'). This way the juices are kept inside. Water is added, the same volume as the meat. Pörkölt should be simmered slowly in very little liquid. Flour should never be used to thicken a Hungarian pörkölt. In Hungary, pörkölt is served with pasta (tészta), tarhonya (big Hungarian pasta grains), galuska, or nokedli as a side dish. Boiled potato is also a common garnish, and pickles may complement the dish.

Romani people have their own version of the dish.

== Outside Hungary ==
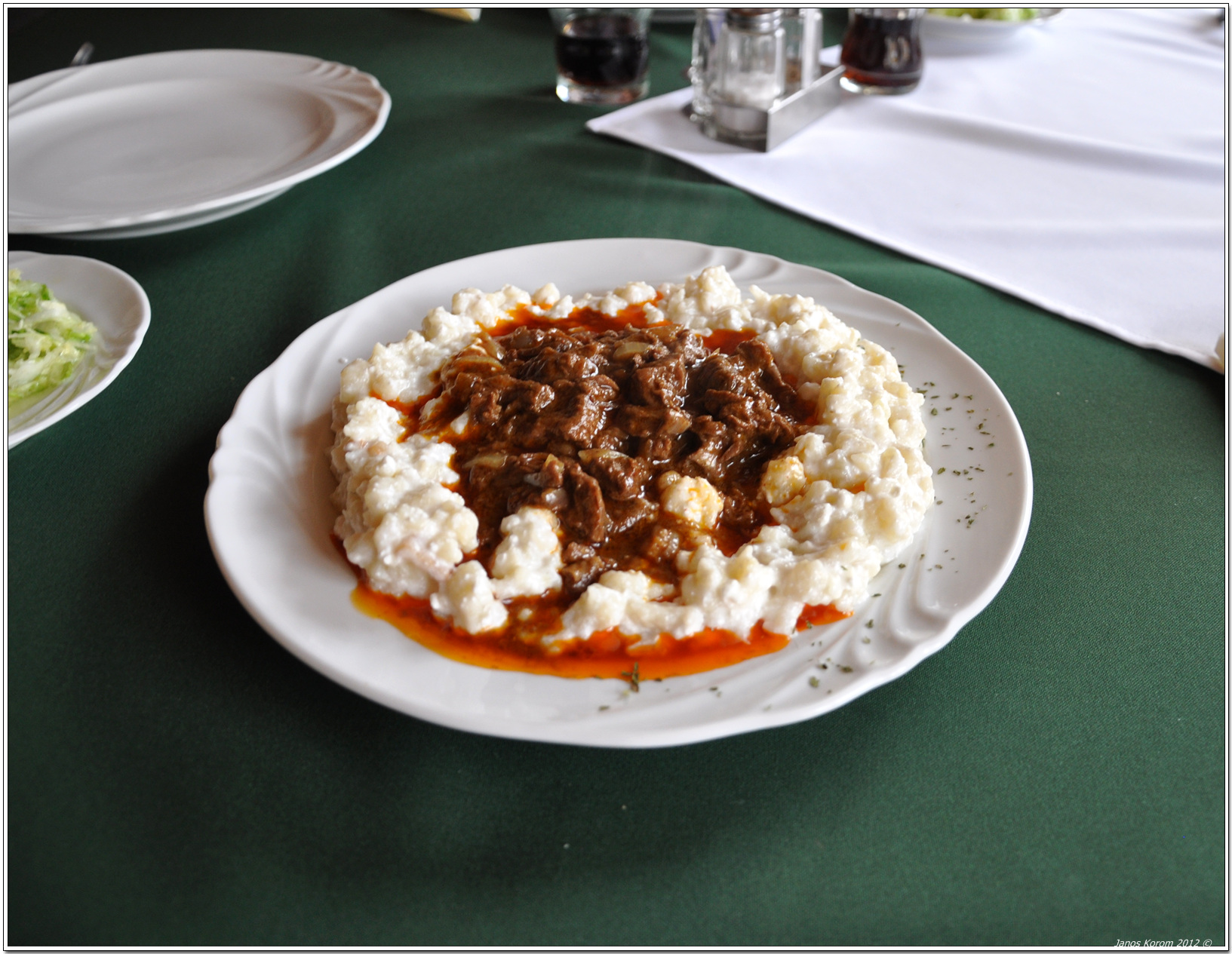
Beef stew with sheep's cottage cheese

There is a different style Hungarian pörkölt stew, tokány, a Transylvanian stew that does not emphasize the use of paprika as much as the pörkölt in Hungary proper. These are stews using black pepper and kitchen herbs like marjoram for spices instead, often made with mixed meats, vegetables and wild mushrooms, depending on the season and the region. Tokány is often served topped with sour cream, and puliszka (polenta) or boiled potatoes are served as the side dish. In Slovakia, the dish is called perkelt and is served with Halušky dumplings.

== See also ==
- List of stews
