= Bogrács =

Cookware for over a campfire

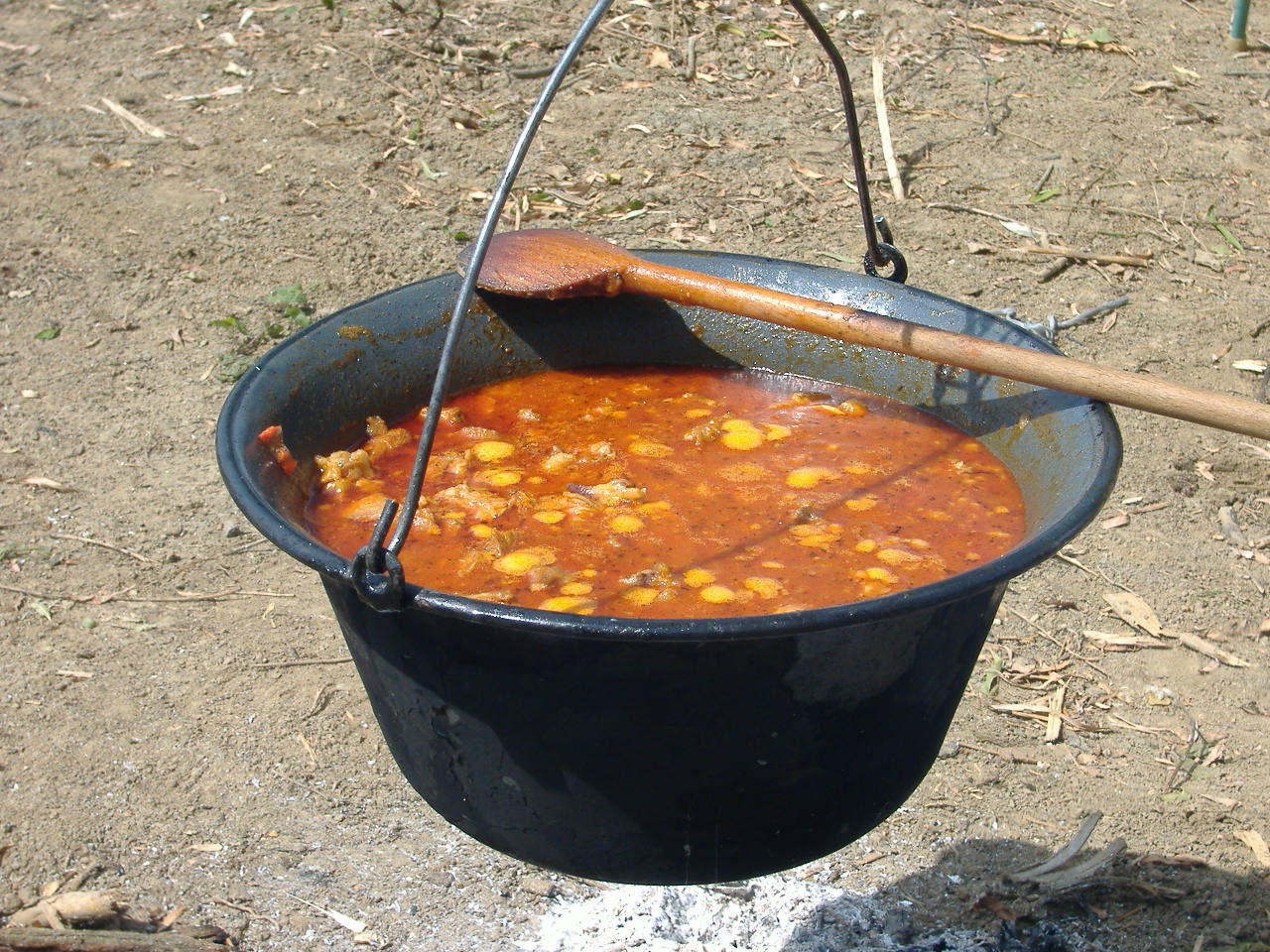
A bogrács over a campfire with goulash in it

A bogrács (Hungarian: [ˈboɡraːt͡ʃ]) is an outside fire cooking pot made of metal. It is suspended from a chain over a campfire. Its distinctive shape and diagonal handle distinguish it from similar cookware. The bogrács was commonly used by the serfs. Its spread can be traced back to the nomadic equestrian cultures, with the cauldron. The ancestor to the bogrács was brought to the Carpathian Basin by the first Hungarians. There are many types of bogrács used, made with different sizes, materials and uses. The word 'bogrács' comes from the word 'bakraç' - an Ottoman-Turkish word meaning 'copper bucket'. It is also considered a dish of Carpathian cuisine.
