= Goulash =

Hungarian meat and vegetable stew

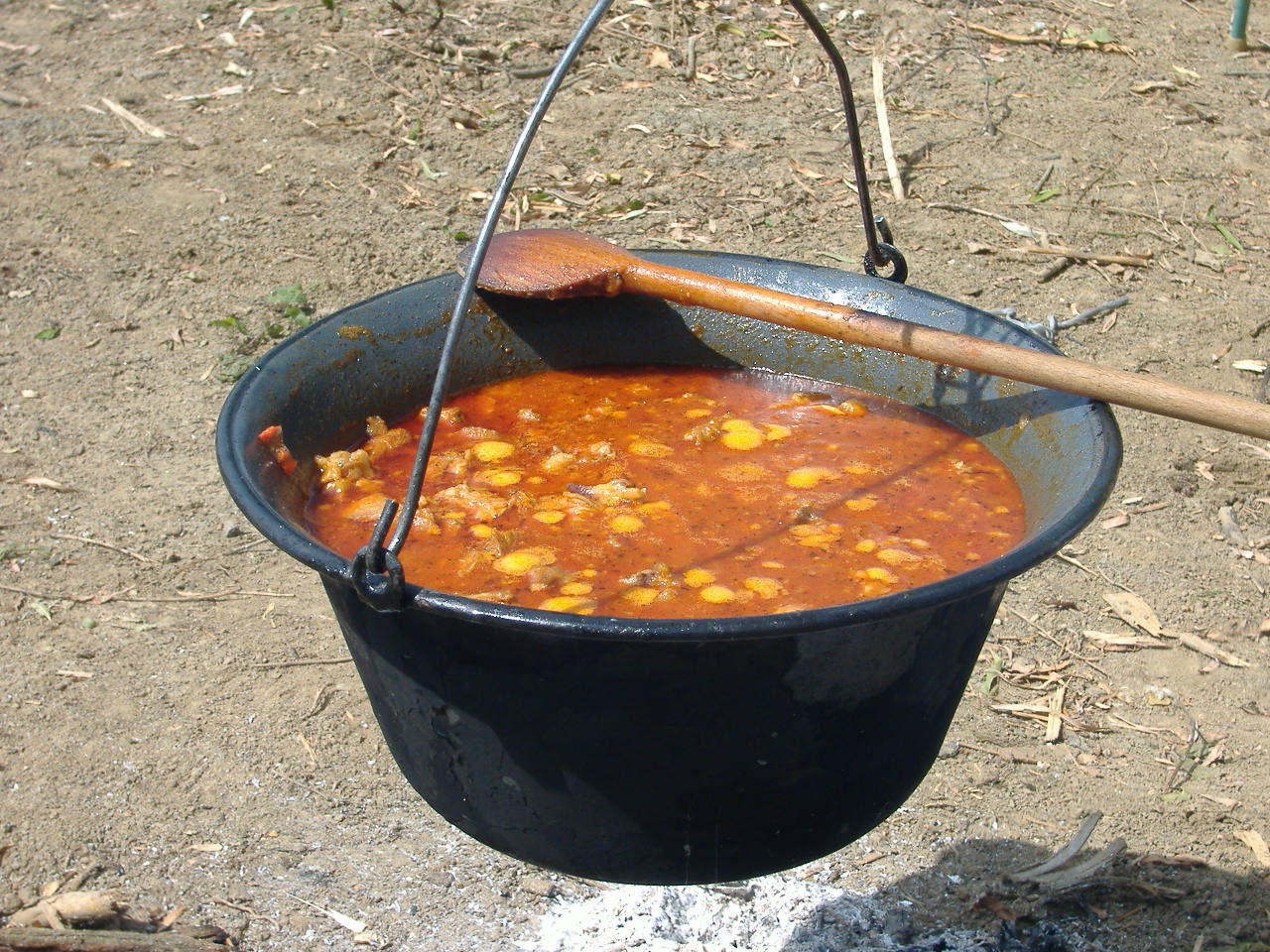
- Goulash cooking in a bogrács (traditional Hungarian cauldron)
- Alternative names: Gulash / Gulyás / Gulaš
- Type: Soup
- Place of origin: Hungary
- Region or state: Central Europe; Balkans
- Serving temperature: Hot

Goulash (Hungarian: Gulyás, Hungarian pronunciation: [ˈgujaːʃlɛvɛʃ]) is a meal made of meat and vegetables seasoned with paprika and other spices. Originating in Hungary, goulash is a common meal predominantly eaten in Central Europe but also in other parts of Europe. It is one of the national dishes of Hungary and a symbol of the country.

Its origins may be traced back as far as the 10th century to stews eaten by Hungarian shepherds. At that time, the cooked and flavoured meat was sun-dried and packed into bags produced from sheep's stomachs, needing only water to make it into a meal. Earlier versions of goulash did not include paprika, as it was not introduced to Europe until the 16th century.

== Etymology ==
The name originates from the Hungarian gulyás [ˈɡujaːʃ]. The word gulya means 'herd of cattle' in Hungarian, and gulyás means 'cattle herder' or 'cowboy'. Over time the dish became gulyáshús ('goulash meat') – a meat dish which was prepared by herdsmen.

Today, gulyás refers both to the herdsmen, and the stew. From the Middle Ages until well into the 19th century, the Puszta was home to enormous herds of cattle sold at cattle markets in Moravia, Vienna, Nuremberg and Venice. The herdsmen used cows slaughtered along the way to market to prepare gulyáshús.

== In Hungarian culture ==
=== Gulyás ===
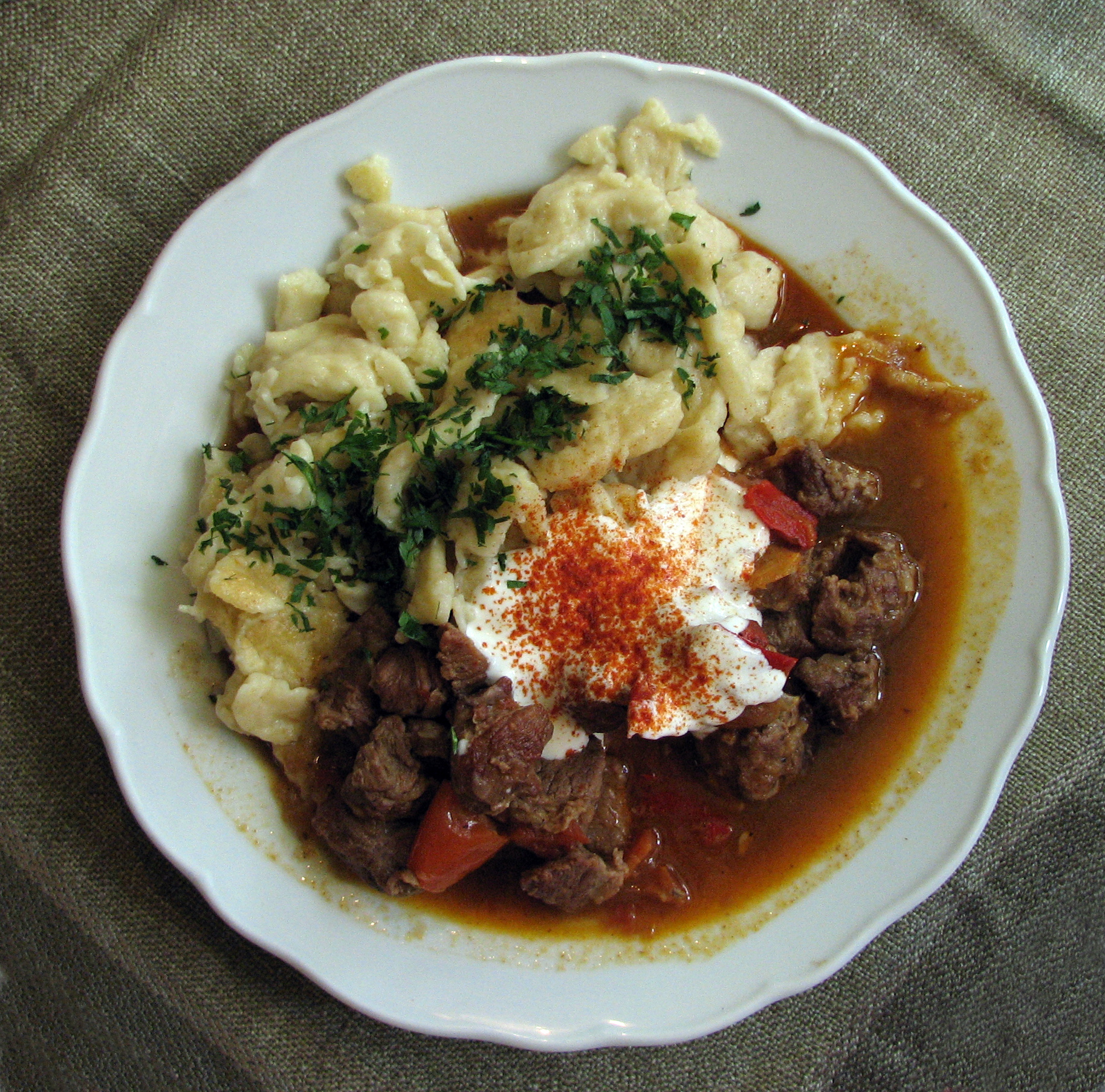
Pörkölt

In Hungarian cuisine, traditional gulyás, pörkölt, and paprikás are dishes which evolved from the food of the cattle herders of the Hungarian plains.

In present-day Hungary, gulyás is known as a soup. It is also called gulyásleves, which translates to gulyás soup, although gulyás is understood commonly as a soup without specifying. While it may have more solid parts than broth and some versions may be called by English speakers a stew, the Hungarian language makes a strict distinction between stews and gulyás. The dish called gulyás is quite conservative with very little variations through the country. The basic ingredients include beef, onions, paprika, caraway seeds, potatoes, carrots and fresh noodles added directly to the soup (csipetke). Altered versions have their own name, like babgulyás which has beans or hamisgulyás ("fake goulash") which is meatless. Bográcsgulyás means a gulyás prepared traditionally in a kettle or cauldron, called bogrács, outdoors, over open fire. It can be prepared anywhere because it needs only the bogrács, an iron tripod, a chain and a campfire. Every type of gulyás is a strictly one-pot dish and considered a main course, even if it is a more soupy version.

Except for paprikás, Hungarian stews do not rely on flour or roux for thickening. Original Hungarian recipes rarely use tomatoes and only in small quantities, the deep red colors come all from the authentic Hungarian paprika spice.

Modern gulyás is made from beef, while the original herdsmen had more access to mutton (called birkagulyás). Typical cuts include the shank, shin, or shoulder; in Hungary beef from older cattle is more common, which takes longer to cook but is perceived by some diners as more tasty. Meat is cut into chunks, seasoned with salt, and then browned with sliced onion in a pot with oil or lard. Paprika is added, along with water. After that the gulyás is left to simmer. After cooking a while, whole or ground caraway seed, and soup vegetables like potato, carrot, or parsley root are added. However, paprika and potatoes are post-16th century additions, while gulyás traces its origin back to the Hungarians' nomadic past. At the end small egg noodles called csipetke can be added. The name csipetke comes from pinching small, fingernail-sized bits out of fresh dough (csipet being Hungarian for 'pinch') before adding them to the boiling soup. Stew-like versions of gulyás are made the same way with letting the broth simmer down.

Restaurants use altered recipes, where the extreme long cooking time is replaced with broth, and the csipetke noodles are substituted by nokedli.

International goulash is a dish closer to the Hungarian dish pörkölt, a stew which evolved from the original gulyás, or paprikás, the version of pörkölt with sour cream. After the former herdsmen's dish became popular throughout the whole of Hungarian society, variations arose which did not strictly adhere to the techniques used for outdoor cooking. Nokedli or galuska, a Hungarian version of the traditional German noodle Spaetzle, became a side dish for stews. Nokedli is made by grating liquid dough into boiling water. While gulyás is always made of beef or mutton, pörkölt and paprikás can have a wider variety of meats like chicken or pork. The type of the meat is marked in the name of the dishes, usually: marhapörkölt (beef), sertéspörkölt (pork), csirkepörkölt (chicken) or kakaspörkölt (rooster). These don't include fish with the notable exception of harcsapaprikás (catfish paprikás).

=== Hungarian varieties ===
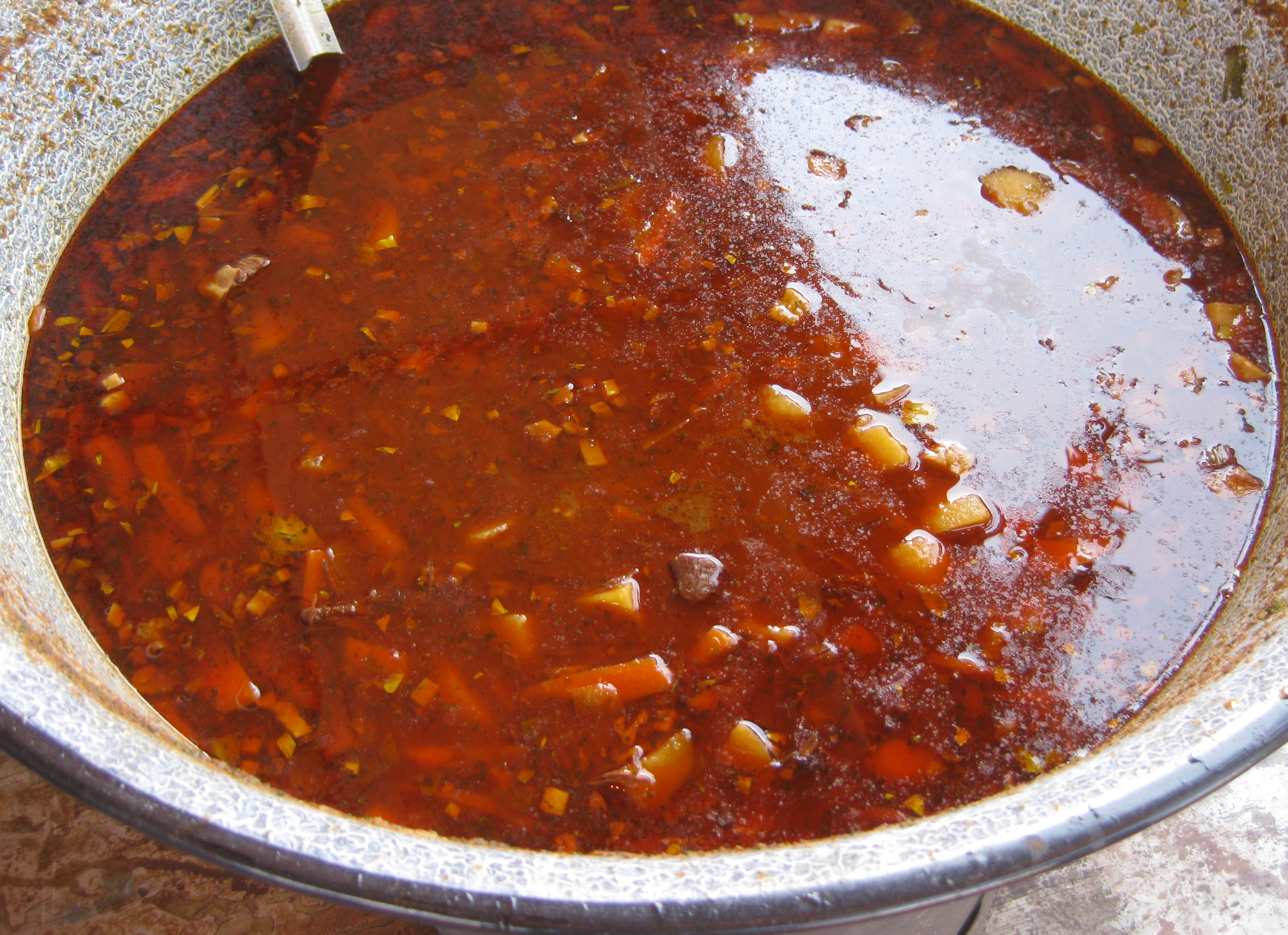
Bográcsgulyás (Cauldron Goulash)

Hungarian goulash variations include:

- Bográcsgulyás. Gulyásleves prepared in a kettle or cauldron, called bogrács.
- Székely Gulyás. Omit the potatoes and add sauerkraut and sour cream.
- Gulyás Hungarian Plain Style. Omit the homemade soup pasta (csipetke) and add vegetables
- Mock Gulyás. Substitute beef bones for the meat and add vegetables. Also called Hamisgulyás (fake goulash)
- Bean Gulyás. Omit the potatoes and the caraway seeds. Use kidney beans instead.
- Csángó Gulyás. Add sauerkraut instead of pasta and potatoes.
- Betyár Gulyás. Use smoked beef or smoked pork for meat.
- Likócsi Pork Gulyás. Use pork and thin vermicelli in the goulash instead of potato and soup pasta. Flavour with lemon juice.
- Mutton Gulyás or Birkagulyás. Made with mutton. Add red wine for flavour.

A thicker and richer goulash, similar to a stew, originally made with three kinds of meat, is called Székely gulyás, named after the Hungarian writer, journalist and archivist József Székely (1825–1895).

=== Paprikás krumpli ===
"Paprikás krumpli" is a traditional paprika-based potato stew with diced potatoes, onion, ground paprika, and some bacon or sliced spicy sausage, like the smoked Debrecener, in lieu of beef.

In German-speaking countries, this inexpensive peasant stew is made with sausage and known as Kartoffelgulasch ("potato goulash"). Bell pepper is sometimes added.

== Outside Hungary ==
Thick stews similar to pörkölt and the original cattlemen stew are popular throughout almost all the former Austrian-Hungarian Empire, from Northeast Italy to the Carpathians. Like pörkölt, these stews are generally served with boiled or mashed potato, polenta, dumplings (e.g. nokedli, or galuska), spätzle or, alternatively, as a stand-alone dish with bread. Romani people have their own version of goulash.

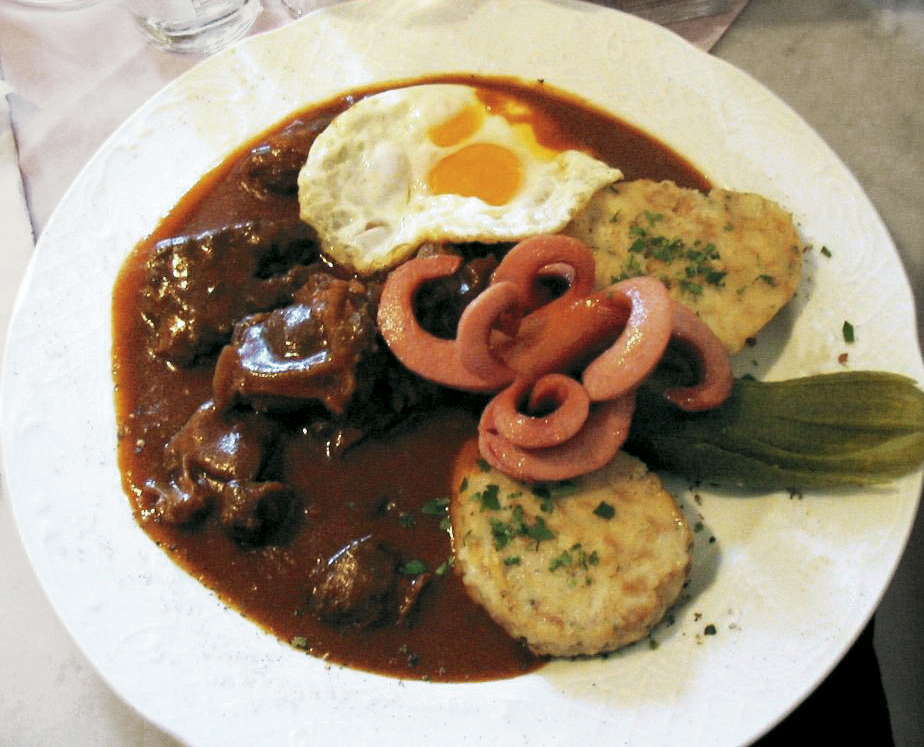
Fiakergulasch as served in Vienna, Austria

=== Austria ===
In Vienna, the former center of the Austro-Hungarian Empire, a special kind of goulash has developed. The Wiener Saftgulasch or the Fiakergulasch (Fiacre being a horse-drawn cab) on the menu in traditional restaurants is a rich pörkölt-like stew; more onions but no tomatoes or other vegetables are used, and it usually comes just with dark bread. A variation of the Wiener Saftgulasch is the Fiakergulasch, which is served with fried egg, fried sausage, pickles, and dumplings named Semmelknödel.

=== Bosnia and Herzegovina ===
In Bosnia and Herzegovina, goulash (Bosnian: gulaš) is a very popular and traditional dish. Introduced during the Austro-Hungarian Empire, it has become a staple with the Bosnian variant consisting of a thicker consistency, with emphasis on slow-cooked onions and meat. It is typically served with bread, mashed potatoes, or polenta, and regional variations may include veal, carrots, or beans.

=== Croatia ===
Goulash (Croatian: gulaš) is also very popular in most parts of Croatia, especially north (Hrvatsko Zagorje) and Lika. In Gorski Kotar and Lika, venison or wild boar frequently replace beef (lovački gulaš). There is also a kind of goulash with porcini mushrooms (gulaš od vrganja). Bacon is an important ingredient.

Gulaš is often served with fuži, njoki, polenta or pasta. It is augmented with vegetables. Green and red bell peppers and carrots are most commonly used. Sometimes one or more other kinds of meat are added, e.g., pork loin, bacon, or mutton.

=== Czech Republic and Slovakia ===
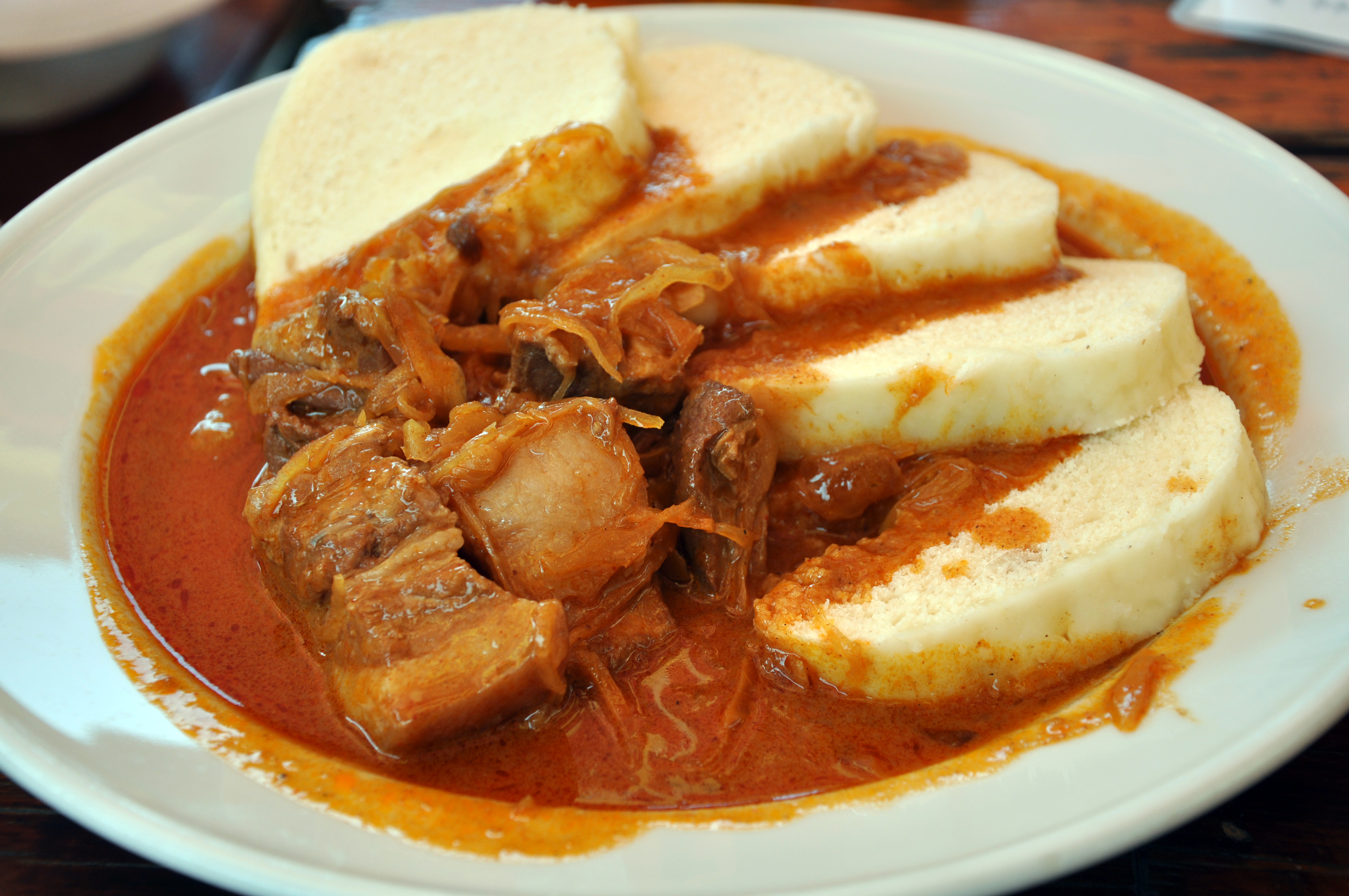
Szeged goulash served in a Prague pub with Czech knedliky

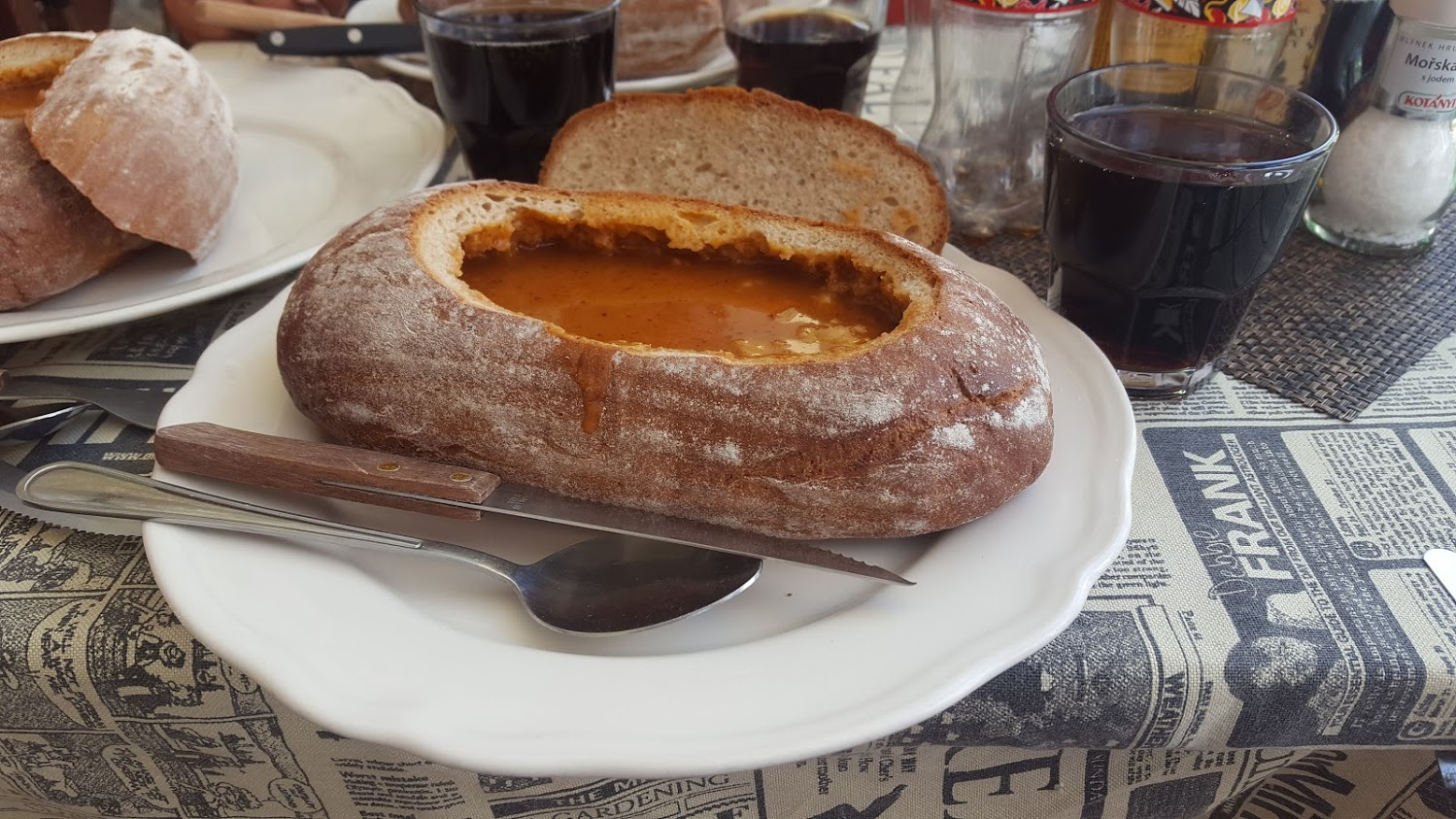
Goulash served in bread in a restaurant in Prague

In the Czech Republic and Slovakia, goulash (Czech and Slovak: guláš) is usually made with beef, although pork varieties exist, and served with boiled or steamed bread dumplings (goulash with beef in Czech hovězí guláš s knedlíkem, in Slovak hovädzí guláš s knedľou), in Slovakia more typically with bread. In pubs it is often garnished with slices of fresh onion, and is typically accompanied by beer. Beer can be also added to the stew in the process of cooking. Seasonal varieties of goulash include venison or wild boar goulashes. Another popular variant of guláš is segedínský guláš (Székelygulyás), with sauerkraut.

In Czech and Slovak slang, the word guláš means "mishmash", typically used as mít v tom guláš: to be disoriented or to lack understanding of something.

=== Germany ===
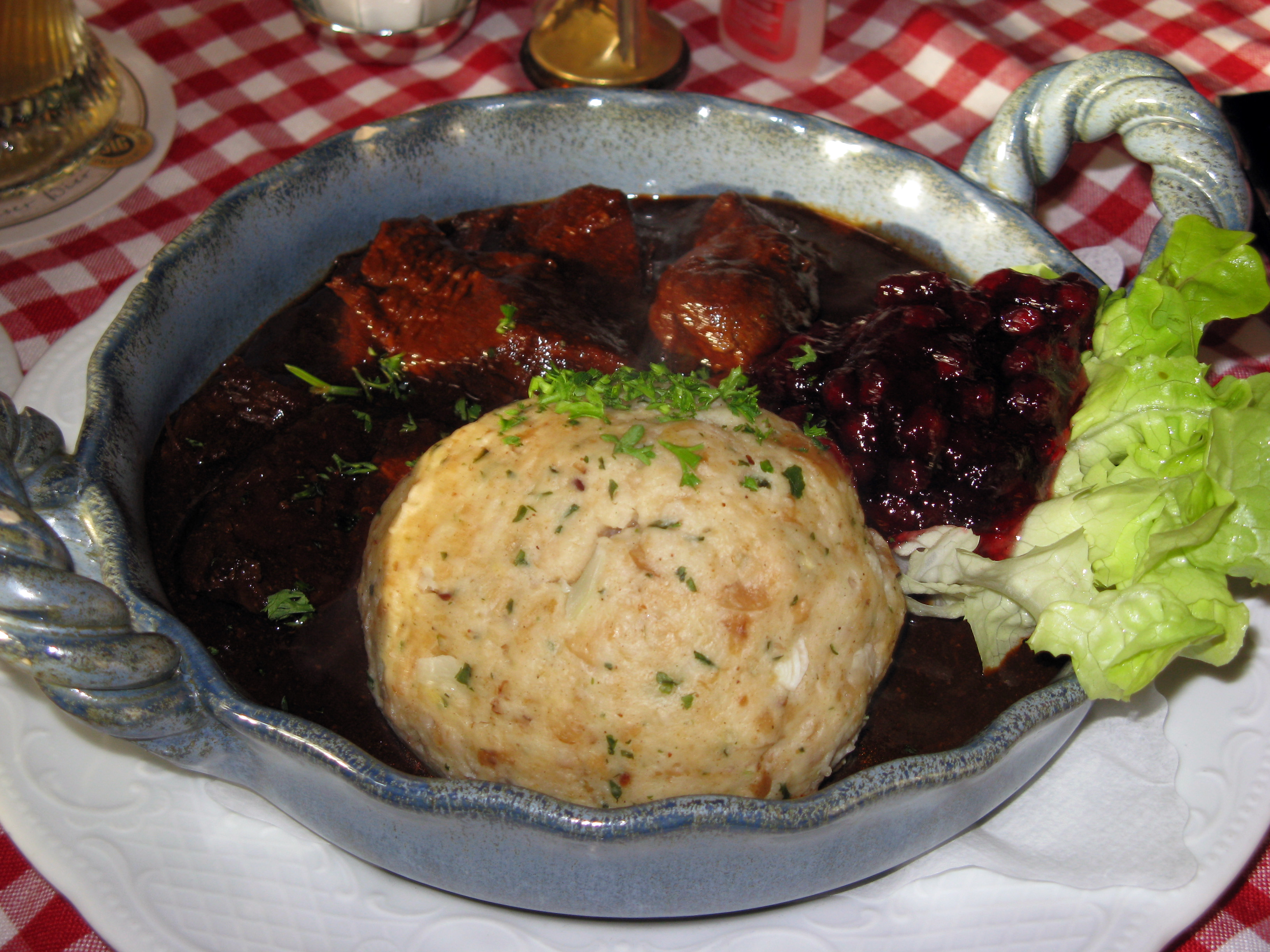
Venison goulash with Bavarian bread dumpling

German Gulasch is either a beef (Rindergulasch), pork (Schweinegulasch), venison (Hirschgulasch), or wild boar (Wildschweingulasch) stew that may include red wine and is usually served with potatoes (in the north), white rice or spirelli noodles (mostly in canteens), and dumplings (in the south). Gulaschsuppe (goulash soup) is the same concept served as a soup, usually with pieces of white bread.

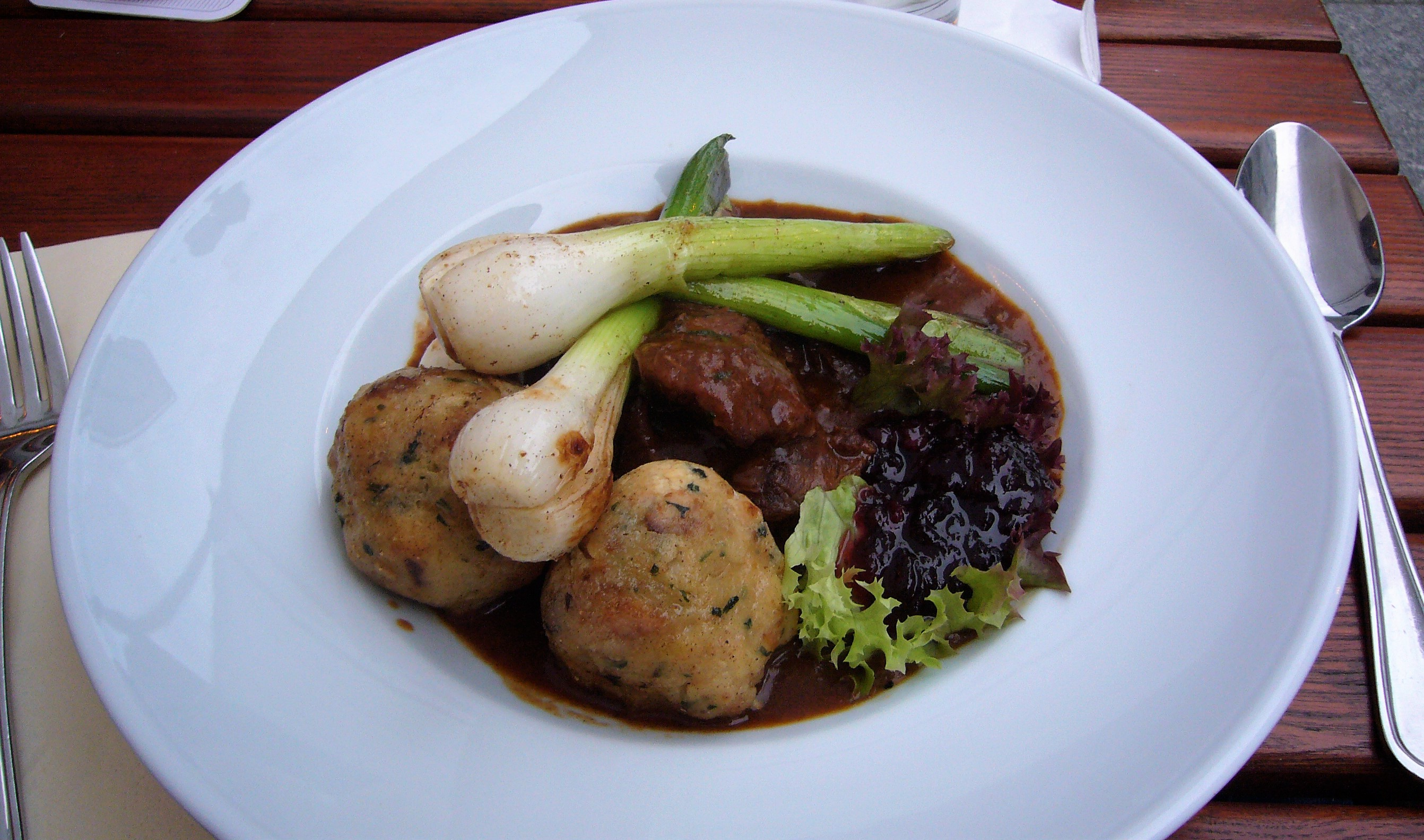
Venison goulash with dumplings, leeks, and lingonberry sauce served in Berlin

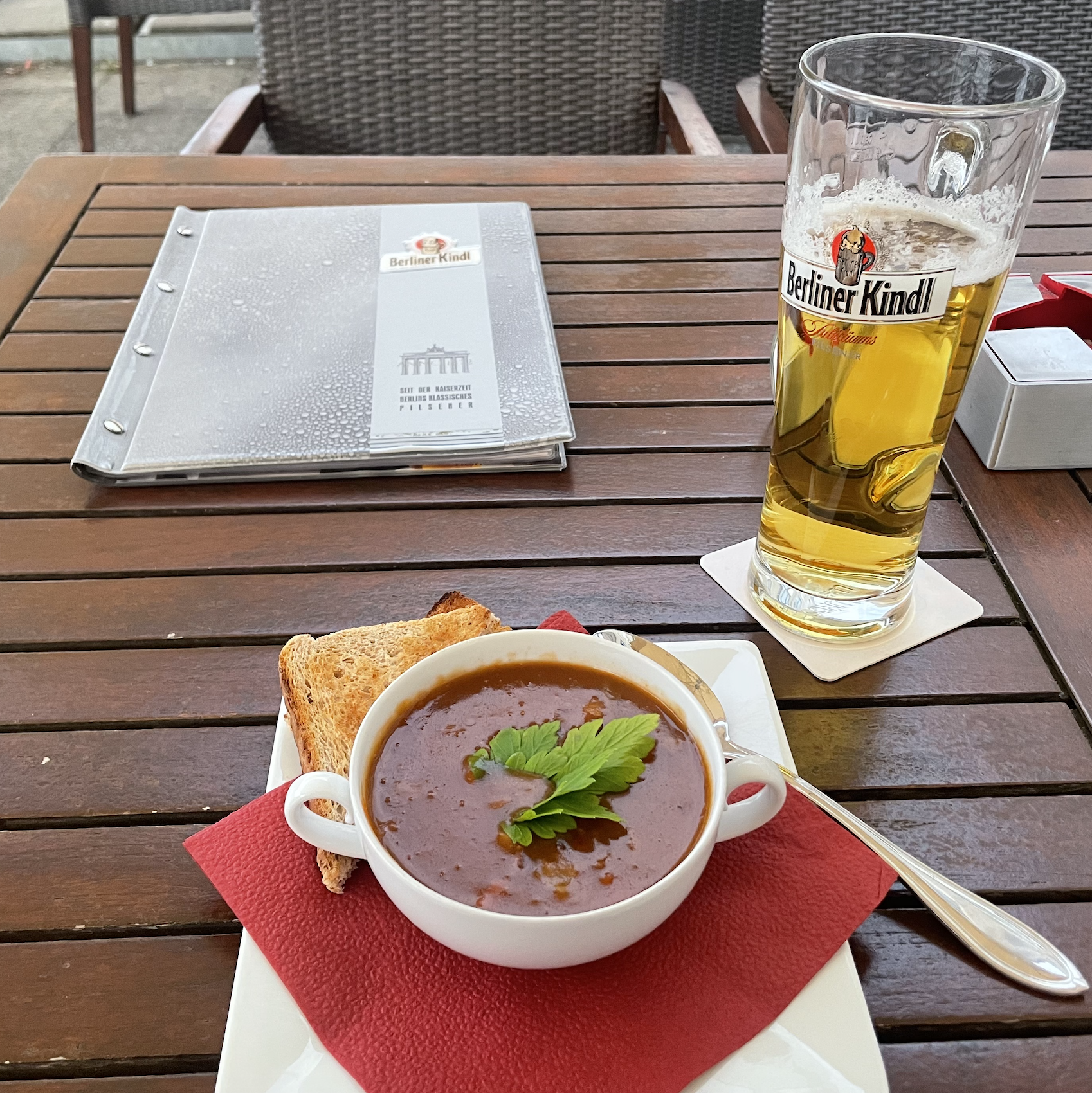
Tomato-based goulash with root vegetables, paprika, and beef. Served with beer and brown bread at an outdoor café in Berlin

=== Italy ===
Goulash in Italy is eaten in the autonomous regions of Friuli-Venezia Giulia and Trentino-Alto Adige/Südtirol, that once had been part of the Austro-Hungarian Empire. It is eaten as a regular Sunday dish. It can also, although less typically so, be found in the nearby Veneto. An interesting regional recipe comes from the Pustertal (Val Pusteria, Puster Valley) in South Tyrol. It is made of beef and red wine, and seasoned with rosemary, red paprika, bay leaf, marjoram and lemon zest, served with crusty white bread or polenta. Goulash is also quite popular in the city of Ancona, which is culturally quite near to eastern Europe.

=== Netherlands ===
In the Netherlands, goulash is usually prepared with beef. It is typically consumed as a stew, and is thus closer to pörkölt.

=== Poland ===
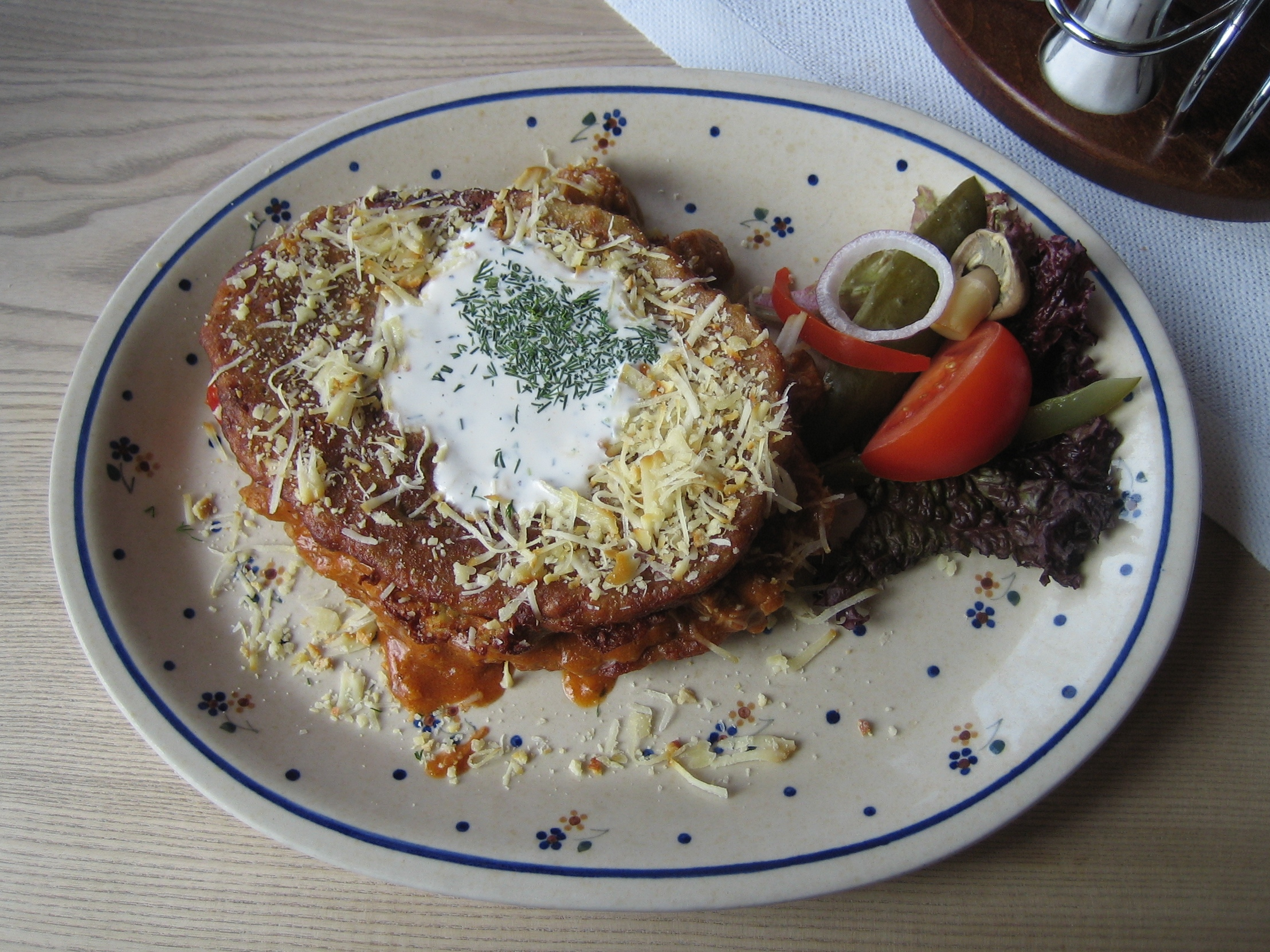
Polish potato pancake and spicy goulash with sheep milk cheese and sour cream

In Poland, goulash (Polish: gulasz) is eaten in most parts of the country. A variant dish exists that is similar to Hungarian pörkölt. It came into being around the 9th century. It is usually served with mashed potatoes or various forms of noodles and dumplings, such as pyzy.

=== Serbia ===
In Serbia, goulash (Serbian: гулаш) is eaten in most parts of the country, especially in Vojvodina, where it was probably introduced by the province's Hungarian population. It is a pörkölt-like stew, usually made with beef, veal or pork, but also with game meat like venison and boar. Compulsory ingredients are meat and onions, usually in 50-50% ratio, paprika, and lard or oil, other ingredients being optional: garlic, parsley, chili pepper, black pepper, cinnamon, bell peppers, carrots, tomatoes, red wine, mushrooms, bacon. Sometimes, goulash is sweetened by adding tomato paste, sugar or dark chocolate at the very end. In Serbia, goulash is most often served with macaroni or potato mash.

=== Slovenia ===
In Slovene partizanski golaž, "partisan goulash", favoured by Slovenian partisans during the Second World War, is still regularly served at mass public events. "Partisan golaž" uses onion in equal proportion to meat; two or more types of meat are usually used in preparing this dish. The most widespread form of golaž in home cooking is a thick beef stew that is most commonly served with mashed potatoes. As elsewhere in the wider region, Szeged goulash, usually referred to as segedin, is also a popular dish for home preparation.

=== United States and Canada ===
North American goulash, mentioned in cookbooks since at least 1914, exists in a number of variant recipes. Originally a dish of seasoned beef, core ingredients of American goulash now usually include elbow macaroni, cubed steak or ground beef, and tomatoes in some form, whether canned whole, as tomato sauce, tomato soup, and/or tomato paste. As a descendant, of sorts, of Hungarian goulash, it probably originated as a variation of the Hungarian bográcsgulyás which mixes all the ingredients together in the end. This mixture of ingredients has probably led to many variations where any mixture of meat and paprika is often called goulash. In English, the word “goulash” has an alternative meaning of "a mixture of heterogeneous elements or hodgepodge or jumble". The dish is popular among American Jews.

== See also ==
- List of Hungarian dishes
- Goulash Communism
