= Székelykáposzta =

Hungarian stew dish

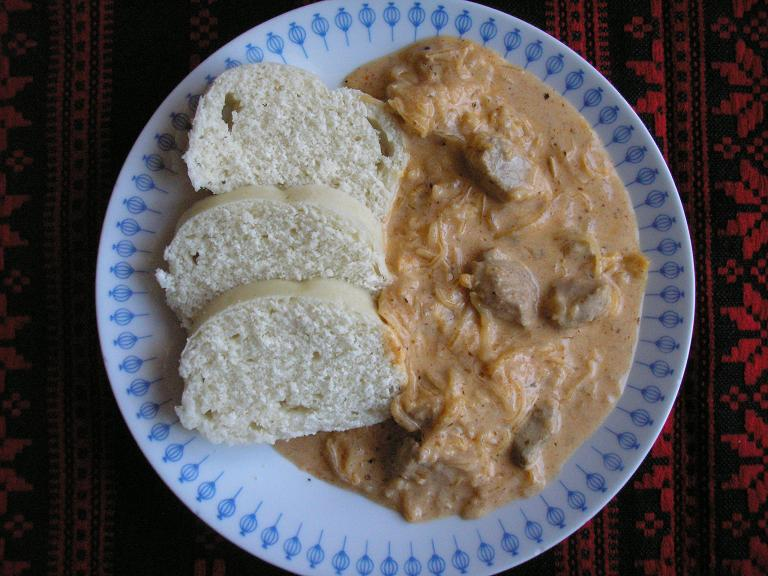
- Székelykáposzta
- Type: Stew
- Course: Main dish
- Place of origin: Hungary
- Main ingredients: Pork, sauerkraut, spices, tomatoes, bell peppers, broth, sour cream, bread

Székelykáposzta also known as "cabbage stew à la Székely" or "Székely goulash" (known as "segedínský guláš" in Czech, "segedínsky guláš" in Slovak, "Szegediner Gulasch" in German, "segedin golaž" in Slovenian and "gulasz segedyński" in Polish) is a distinctive dish in Hungarian and Eastern European cuisine. Contrary to its name, it does not originate from the Székely people, and traditional Transylvanian cuisine does not recognize it.

== History ==
According to legend, the recipe for this dish is attributed to József Székely, a county archivist from the 19th century who was a contemporary and friend of the Hungarian poet Sándor Petőfi. In 1846, while dining at the Komló Garden on Gránát Street in Pest, they found the available dishes running out. In response to Székely's request, the innkeeper served a concoction made by mixing leftover sauerkraut stew with pork stew. Allegedly, Petőfi ordered the same dish on a subsequent occasion, referring to it as "Székely-cabbage."

The recipe is not found in József C. Dobos's 1881 Hungarian-French cookbook, but it does appear in Ágnes Zilahy's 1891 "Valódi magyar szakácskönyv" (Genuine Hungarian Cookbook) in the section on side dishes.

The occasional appearance of "Szeged goulash" on international menus is likely the result of a mishearing of the name "Székely goulash" in Vienna. Alternatively, the name may suggest the inclusion of Szeged paprika, although such dishes do not originate from or characterize Szeged. In Hungary, "Szeged goulash" refers to a different dish made with vegetables and dumplings.

== Serving ==
It is typically served with slices of a bread-like dumpling, accompanied by a light, spicy red wine (such as kadarka), cold sour cream, and chili pepper cream.
