= Paprika Tap de Cortí =

Spice made from red peppers

Paprika Tap de Cortí is the result of grinding the Tap de Cortí variety of red pepper (Capsicum annuum), which is cultivated and processed only in Majorca and is responsible for giving colour, aroma and taste to the typical dishes and cold meats of Majorca.

These peppers are the fruit of an herbaceous annual plant of the family Solanaceae. It is short—4–7 cm (1.6–2.8 in)—triangular and pointed at the end (similar to a bottle cap with a fresh weight of between 17–20 grams, a dry yield (whole pepper) about 18–20% and sweet. The collection is done in steps, three harvests, and is unique because the fruits grow erect, looking skyward.

== Origins ==
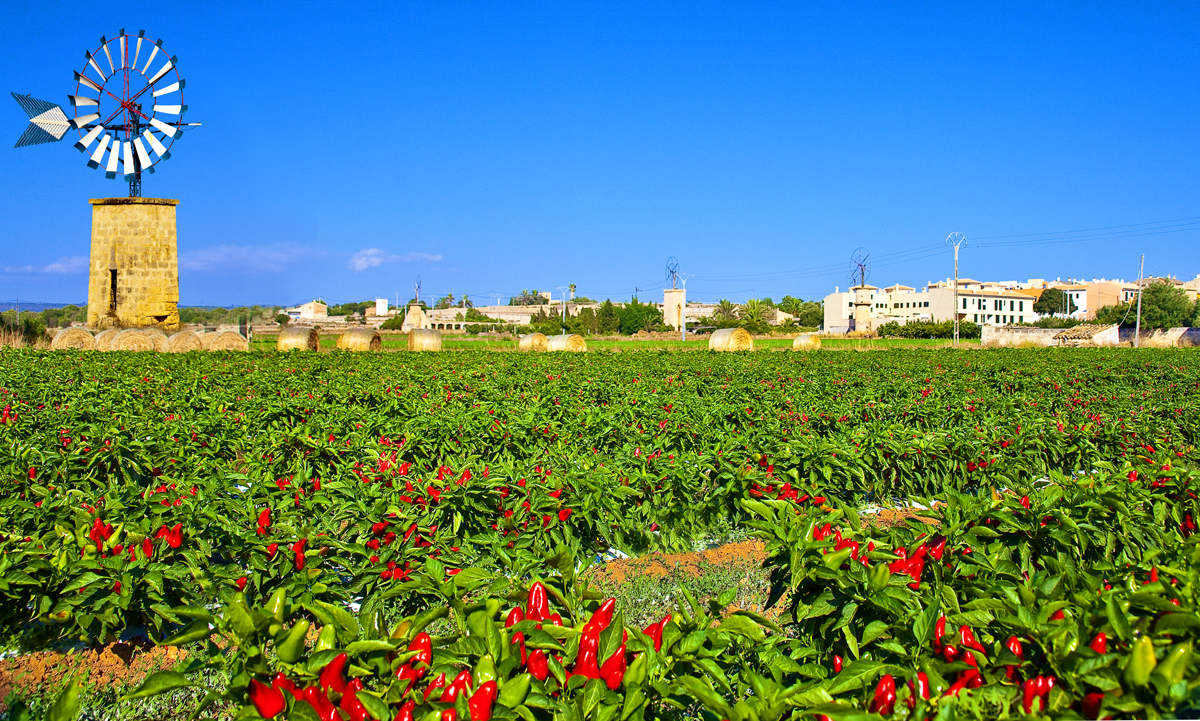
Tap de Cortí Plantation in Sant Jordi, Palma de Mallorca

Paprika arrived in Majorca in the late sixteenth century from America and it quickly became a popular condiment. Already in the nineteenth century Archduke Ludwig Salvador of Austria (known as the King of the Balearen) pointed out that its main use was intended as a condiment, after being sun-dried. He also stresses that the quality of the local pepper was much higher than the pepper from outside.

The pepper Tap de Cortí is cultivated in most villages of Majorca: Felanitx, Sa Pobla, Manacor, Sant Joan, Santa Maria, Sant Jordi, Muro, Llucmajor and Campos among others. Later, between August and October, the façade of the houses in these villages were completely covered with strings of pepper, sun-dried to keep their antioxidants or preservative power, this gave a decorative touch to the Majorca landscape. Nails can be found even today in some of the façades. Nevertheless, these images are not as common as 30 years ago.

From the 70's the Tap de Cortí production started to decrease due to the loss of competitiveness caused by the entry of the paprika from Murcia at a price unreachable by the Majorca farmer.

== Resurgence ==
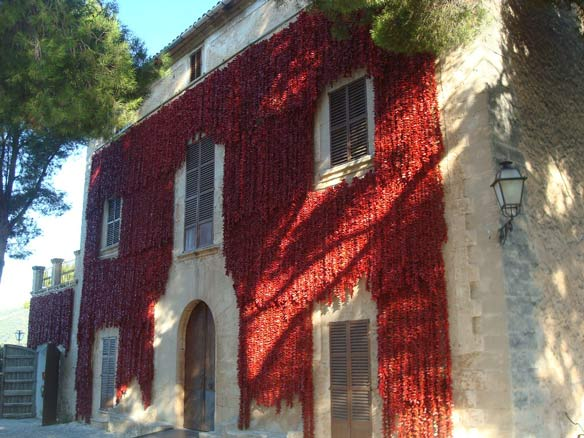
Facade of the Pilar and Joan Miró Foundation covered with peppers Tap of Corti. Son Boter, Mallorca

In order to preserve the local products, in 2008 a traditional Majorcan company started a recovery campaign of paprika Tap de Cortí, seeding approximately 6,000 plants, that has led to the agricultural and gastronomic resurgence.

In 2009 an eco-gastronomic association that believed in the potential of the product, started another recovery campaign distributing about 16,000 free seedlings to a group of ecological farmers committed to the conservation of seeds and local plant varieties. All of them were aware that a union with a diverse groups of gastronomes offered huge possibilities to bring back to the marketplace this variety of paprika on the verge of extinction.

The project included different groups of volunteers like the people from the village of Santa María, inmates from the island's prison and a NGO working with drug addicts. Among all of them strung 3,000 kilos of peppers, in a total of 950 strings that were hung in buildings as ca s'Apotecari of Santa María del Camí.

== Preparation ==
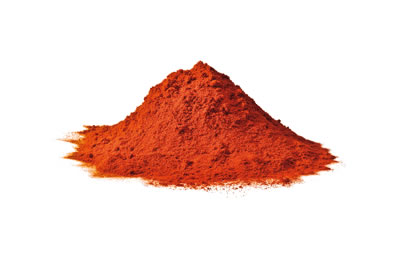
Paprika Tap de Cortí

The peppers are collected by steps, there are until three or four harvests, when the fruit is very ripe and preferable when it has to lose a high humidity grade in the plant. The optimal dried is in the sun with traditional strings of peppers (normally in form of helices or also named three ended points) that are hung in the house's façade, looking for a properly solar orientation, during fifteen days approximately, depending on various factors as the climatological. In this way the pepper natural antioxidant are not lost, like the Vitamin C, and that is the reason why the paprika become the best preservative of the sobrassada.

Then it is baked at a low temperature, below 50–60 °C, to eliminate the last degree of moisture and facilitate the grinding. The stem is removed leaving a portion of the seeds, and crushed before grinding. The ground is done using stone mills and is necessary to do it from 5 to 6 times. Finally it is sieved and packaged.

== Properties ==
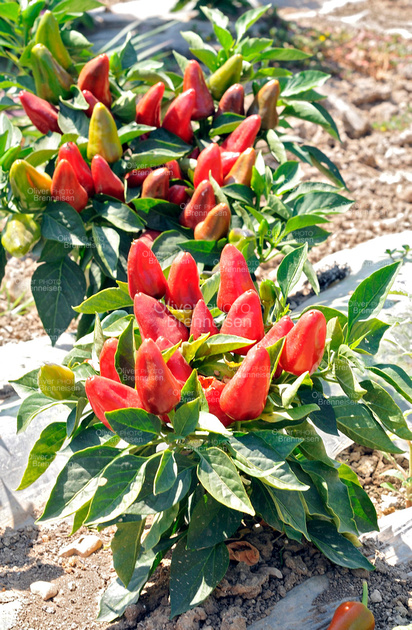
Tap de Corti peppers are pointing to the sky

This paprika is characterized by its red colour, inimitable aroma, and a sweet taste. The ASTA index (a measure of colour) of paprika Tap de Cortí is between 130 and 140 ASTAS ground with its seeds that gives to Tap de Cortí vitamin E. This is a natural antioxidant which is good for seasoning typical dishes of the islands but also for Majorcan sobrassada. Furthermore, as Capsicum annuum also contains a high level of vitamin C.

The Tap de Cortí is hygroscopic; this means that once it is dried and even ground it can absorb some of the lost moisture from the atmosphere.

== Uses ==
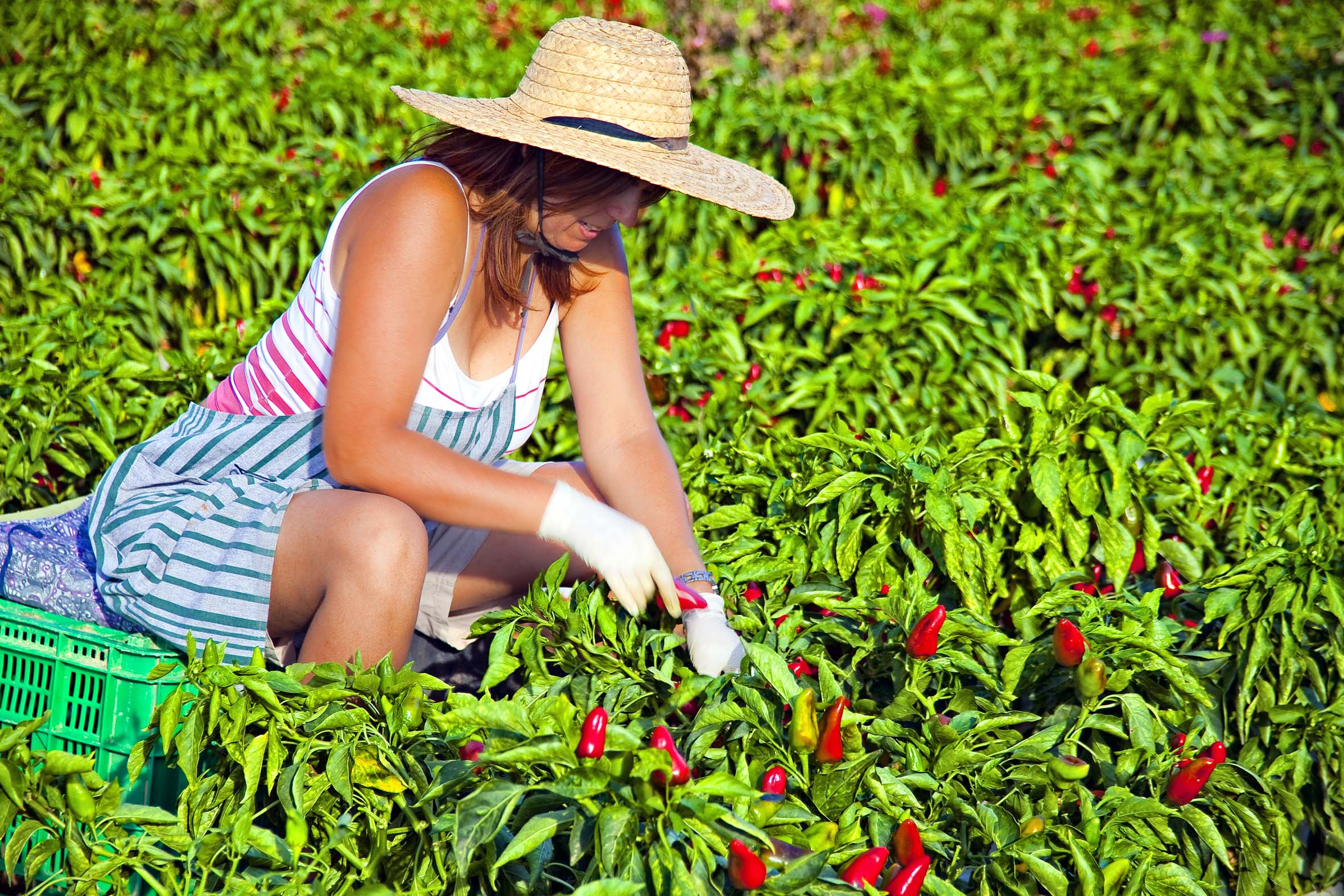
Collection of paprika of Tap de Cortí.

Two are the main uses of Tap de Cortí, on the one hand paprika Tap de Cortí is typical in the traditional Balearic Islands recipes as a seasoning, mainly in stews but also in Majorcan dishes like bullit, arròs brut, various soups, tombet, snails, frit Mallorquí, etc.

On the other hand, paprika Tap de Cortí is used as a preservative for the Majorcan sobrassada (is a raw, cured sausage from the Balearic Islands made with ground pork, paprika and salt and other spices), providing that characteristic red colour and deep aroma. Before Christopher Columbus brought sweet paprika from South America the sobrassada was white and with early expiration, but thanks to the antioxidant properties of paprika, it could keep up to a year if carefully cured in a fresh place. This fact made changed sobrassada from luxury product, consumable only within the first few months regarding its preparation, to a daily consumer product.

The high number of tourism in the Balearic Islands has led to open both national and internationals restaurants increasing the culinary offer in the islands, this has made paprika Tap de Cortí be used in a large quantity national dishes: Galician octopus (Pulpo a feira), Avila potatoes (patatas revolconas) or Madrid boiled (Cocido Madrileño), as well as international dishes such as the famous Hungarian goulash.

== Nutrition and health ==
Tap de Cortí contains mostly water, carbohydrates and fiber, while low fat and protein. Its main contribution is found in the large amount of vitamin C - it contains almost double that of orange or kiwi - a large portion of vitamin A and carotenoids, which give its characteristic red colour while providing Vitamin E, folic acid, vitamin K and in a lesser extent Vitamin B. Among the minerals, the paprika Tap de Cortí supplies calcium, phosphorus, magnesium and potassium. It also has a wealth of non-nutrient compounds, such as the polyphenols, which give it strong antioxidant power, and lycopene (which is also found in tomatoes), with strong anticancer action.

In addition, Capsiate Capsicum extract is obtained from Tap de Cortí, which contains spicy substances (capsinoids), with the ability to increase the metabolism, thus increasing energy consumption and diminishing accumulation of fat in the body.

== Conservation and care ==
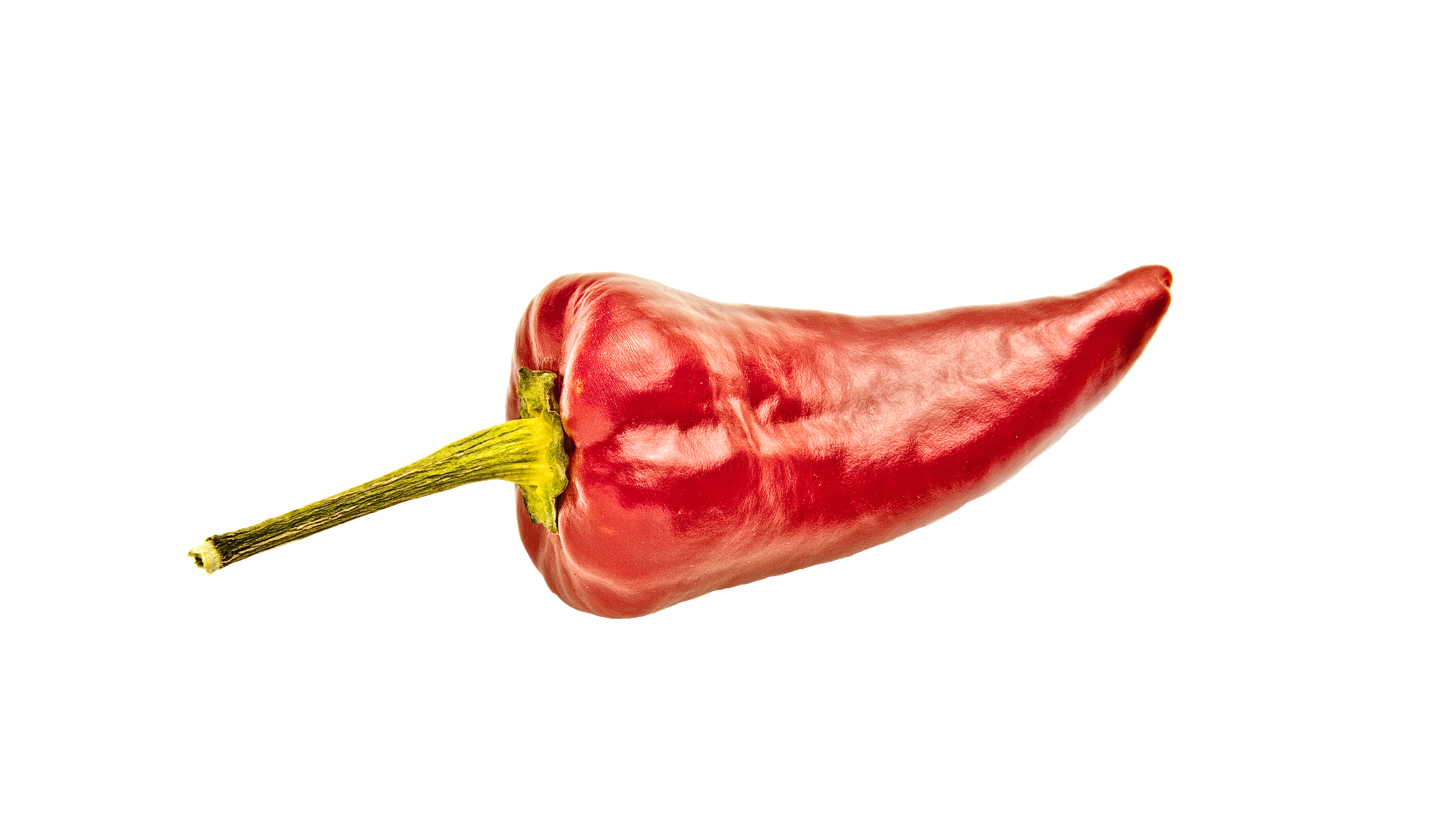
Paprika of Tap de Cortí

To get the best yield, the paprika Tap de Cortí should be consumed within the first two years of life. During this period the aroma, taste and colour reflect the highest quality, after this time lose its properties.

If instead is used to make sobrassada, has to be noted that paprika Tap de Cortí over a year is not advisable as it doesn't have the same qualities organoleptics. Do not to forget that, in addition to taste and aroma, Tap de Cortí has an important role in the correct ripe of sobrassada from a physiochemical point of view.
