= Chicken paprikash =

Hungarian chicken dish seasoned with paprika

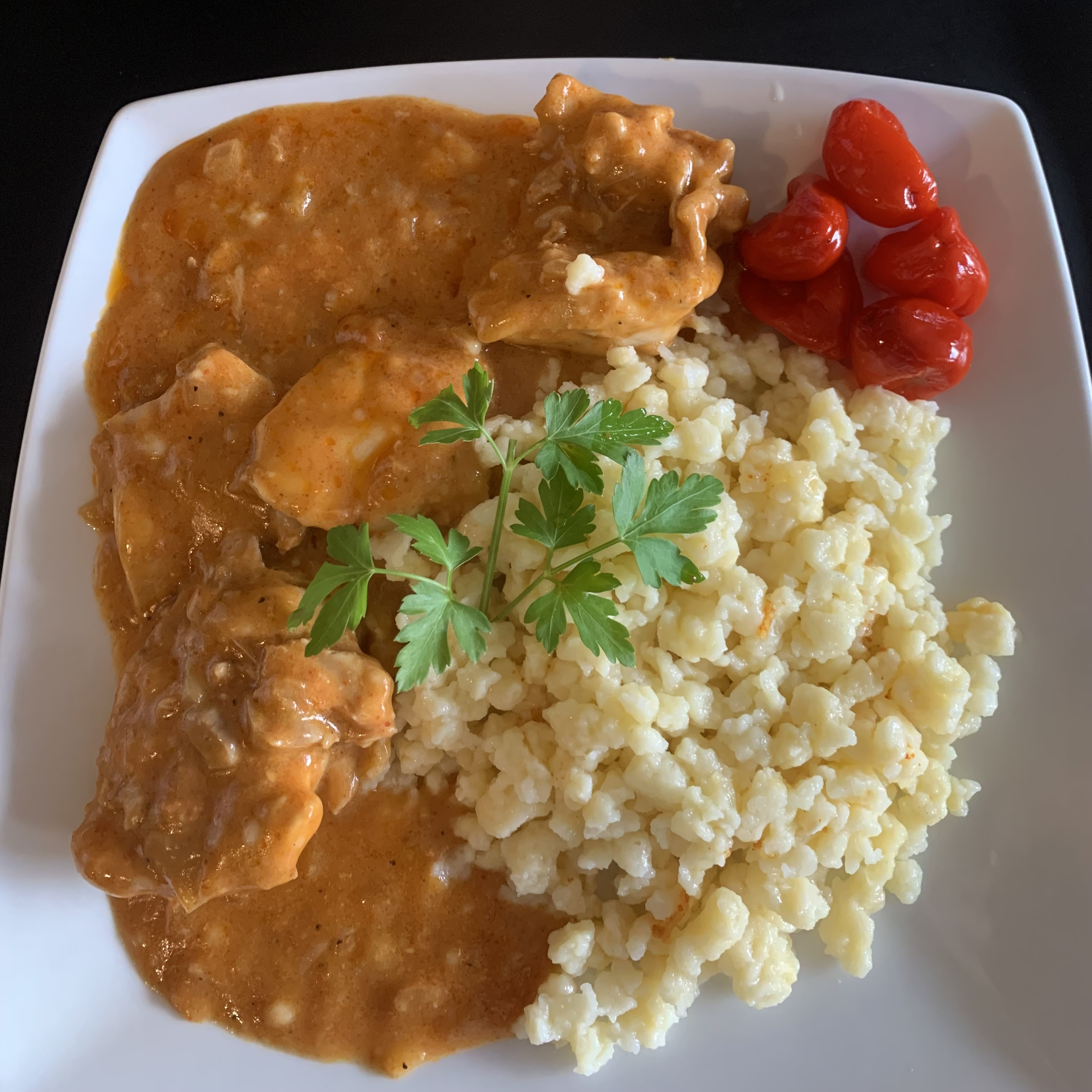
Chicken paprikash with nokedli (Paprikás csirke nokedlivel)

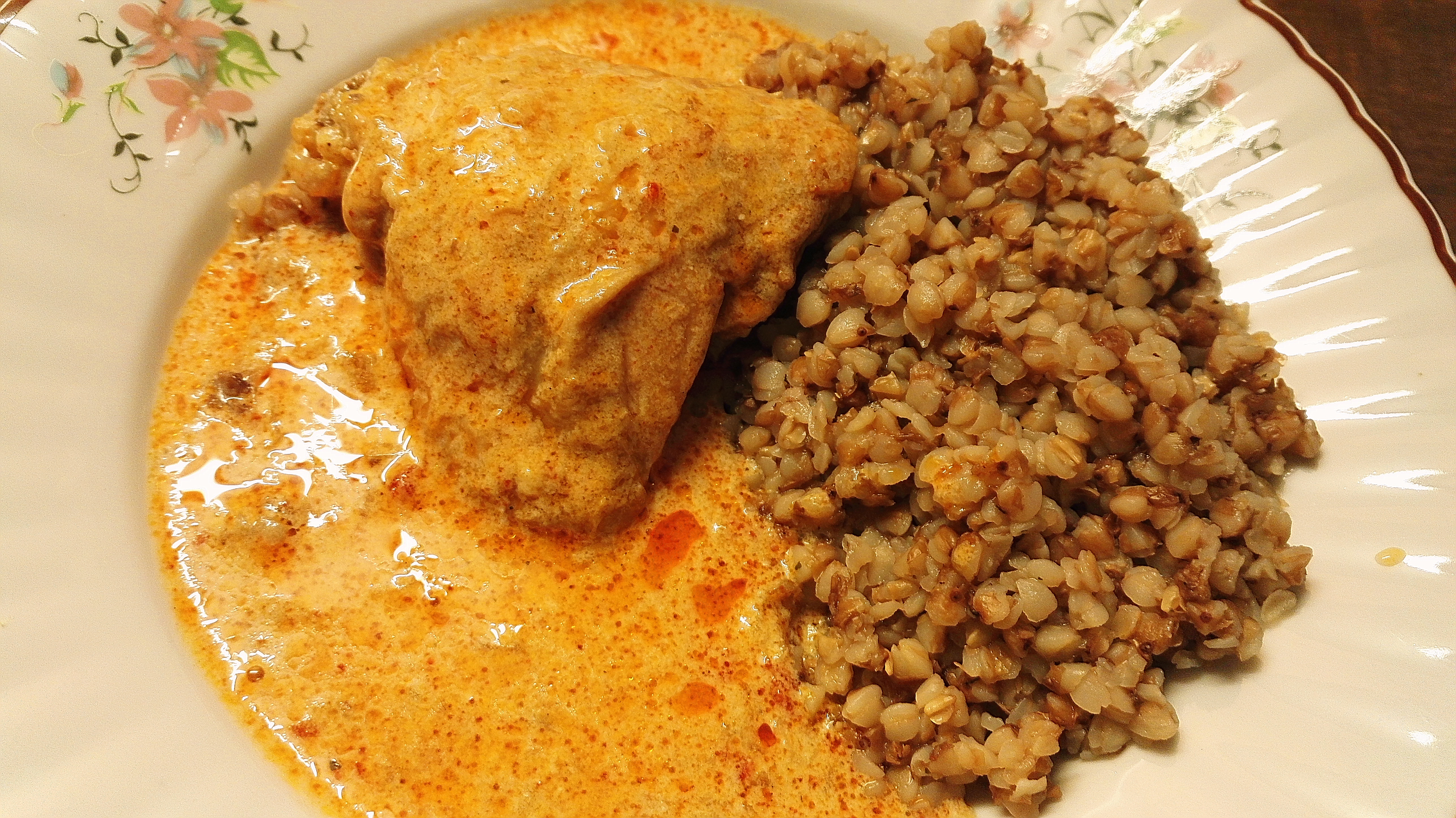
Chicken paprikash with less common buckwheat side dish (not to be confused with tarhonya)

Chicken paprikash (Hungarian: paprikás csirke or csirkepaprikás) or paprika chicken is a popular Hungarian cuisine dish and one of the most famous variations of the paprikás preparations common to Hungarian tables.

The name is derived from paprika, a spice commonly used in the country’s cuisine. The meat is typically simmered for an extended period in a sauce that begins with a roux infused with paprika.

== Preparation ==
The dish can be prepared using édes nemes (sweet) or csípős nemes (spicy) paprika; either adds a rosy color as well as flavor. Sometimes olive oil, sweet red or yellow peppers, and a small amount of tomato paste are used. The dish bears a "family resemblance" to goulash, another paprika dish.

The dish is traditionally served with "dumpling-like boiled egg noodles" (nokedli), a broad noodle similar to the German spätzle. Other common side dishes include tagliatelle, rice, or millet.

== History ==
In the 19th century, pörkölt became a widespread dish among peasants on the Great Hungarian Plain. In addition to the pörkölt made from beef and mutton consumed by shepherds, stews prepared from poultry meat also became popular, reflecting the adaptation of the dish to household circumstances. Initially, the dish had an everyday role among peasants, similar to that among shepherds. In the families of serf farmers in Hatvan in the 1840s, the most common forms of meat dishes were "pörkölt hús" and "paprikás hús", which were prepared not only from beef but also from mutton and poultry.

Paprika was mentioned under many different names in old Hungarian sources, such as "törökbors" (Turkish pepper), "vörösbors" (red pepper), "spanyol bors" (Spanish pepper), "tatárkabors" (Tatar pepper), and "pogány bors" (pagan pepper).

French traveler and sociologist Pierre Guillaume Frédéric Le Play described the meat dishes of a serf farmer from Hatvan in his work Les ouvriers européens (1855):

"They mostly eat meat prepared as a national dish called paprikás hus; this consists of various meats or poultry, cooked with the fat of smoked or unsmoked bacon, seasoned with onions, salt and red pepper (paprika), from which the dish takes its name; the whole is fried for a long time until the juice thickens. Among other meat dishes we should also mention gulyas hus (the shepherds' ragout), whose thin broth is used to flavor bread; and porkelt hus, which is cooked into a thick sauce and eaten cold and set."

During the Reform Era, Hungarian nobility, eager to defend their privileges, emphasized national unity and identity not only through language and dress, but also by elevating simple shepherds' dishes of the Great Plain.

=== First written recipe ===
The first known recipe for chicken paprikash appeared in István Czifray’s Magyar nemzeti szakácskönyv ("Hungarian National Cookbook"), written in 1830 for "Hungarian housewives". Czifray was the court chef of Archduke Joseph. The cookbook already reflects the transformation of Hungarian cuisine, in which chicken paprikash became one of the most popular dishes:

"Paprikás Tsirke (Tsibe, Pisellye). Take two or more chickens and cut them into pieces. Sweat a piece of butter or lard in a copper pot, add paprika, allspice, onion, and stew until yellowish – then add the chopped chicken and stew again until tender – sprinkle with a spoonful of flour, pour in a little meat stock, add sour cream according to your taste so that the sauce will be thick – season with paprika and serve."

According to Magyar Néprajz (Hungarian Ethnography):

"The social rise of paprika as a spice was aided by the treatment of gulyás meat as a national dish. By the Reform Era, culinary art had already created paprika-based dishes (sour cream chicken paprikash). At the same time, the use of paprika still symbolized peasants domestically, while beyond the western borders it symbolized Hungarians – a meaning that has persisted to this day. The use of paprika was not uniform across the Hungarian-speaking territories. Until the mid-20th century, it was hardly used in many parts of Székelyföld, where sausage is brown rather than red as in Hungary. The use of paprika was strongest on the Great Plain. Unlike gulyás or pörkölt, chicken paprikash included sour cream, tying the transformation of the dish to bourgeois cuisine. From here, it spread to poorer social groups."

=== Early price list ===
A handwritten price list by innkeeper Mihály Márkus (Nyíregyháza, 1834) includes:

- "Paprikás hús – 15 krajcár"
- "Paprikás Tsirke – 18 krajcár"

== Variations ==
Food columnist Iles Brody's recipe called for chicken, onions, butter or lard, sweet paprika, green peppers, tomatoes, clove garlic, flour, and sour cream. Other recipes are similar. While quartered chicken parts are more traditional, modern interpretations of the recipe may call for boneless, skinless chicken thighs.

A version of paprikash (паприкаш) exists in Bulgarian cuisine; however, it includes smaller amounts of paprika being added to the sautéed onion at the beginning of the cooking and then adding cubed, usually green, sweet peppers. The dish is centered on the latter.

Chicken paprikash was adopted as a Sabbath dish by the Jews of Hungary and Czechoslovakia and remains popular today amongst Ashkenazim. Tomatoes are often included, and in Romania the dish was traditionally served with mămăligă. When cooked by Jews, chicken paprikash typically does not include any dairy products, due to the Jewish prohibition against mixing meat and dairy.

Chicken paprikasch is also a dish commonly eaten by Danube Swabians.

The Czech variation is often served with knedliky.

== In popular culture ==
Chicken paprikash was a favorite meal among the crew of the SS Edmund Fitzgerald during the 1973 and 1974 shipping seasons.

Chicken paprikash is mentioned in Bram Stoker's Dracula under the alternate name "paprika hendl". The dish is eaten by the protagonist, Johnathan Harker, who wishes to get the recipe for his fiancée, Mina.

In Captain America: Civil War, Vision attempts to make paprikash for Wanda, but apparently fails to get it right.

== See also ==
- List of chicken dishes
