= Baden cuisine =

Regional culinary traditions of Germany

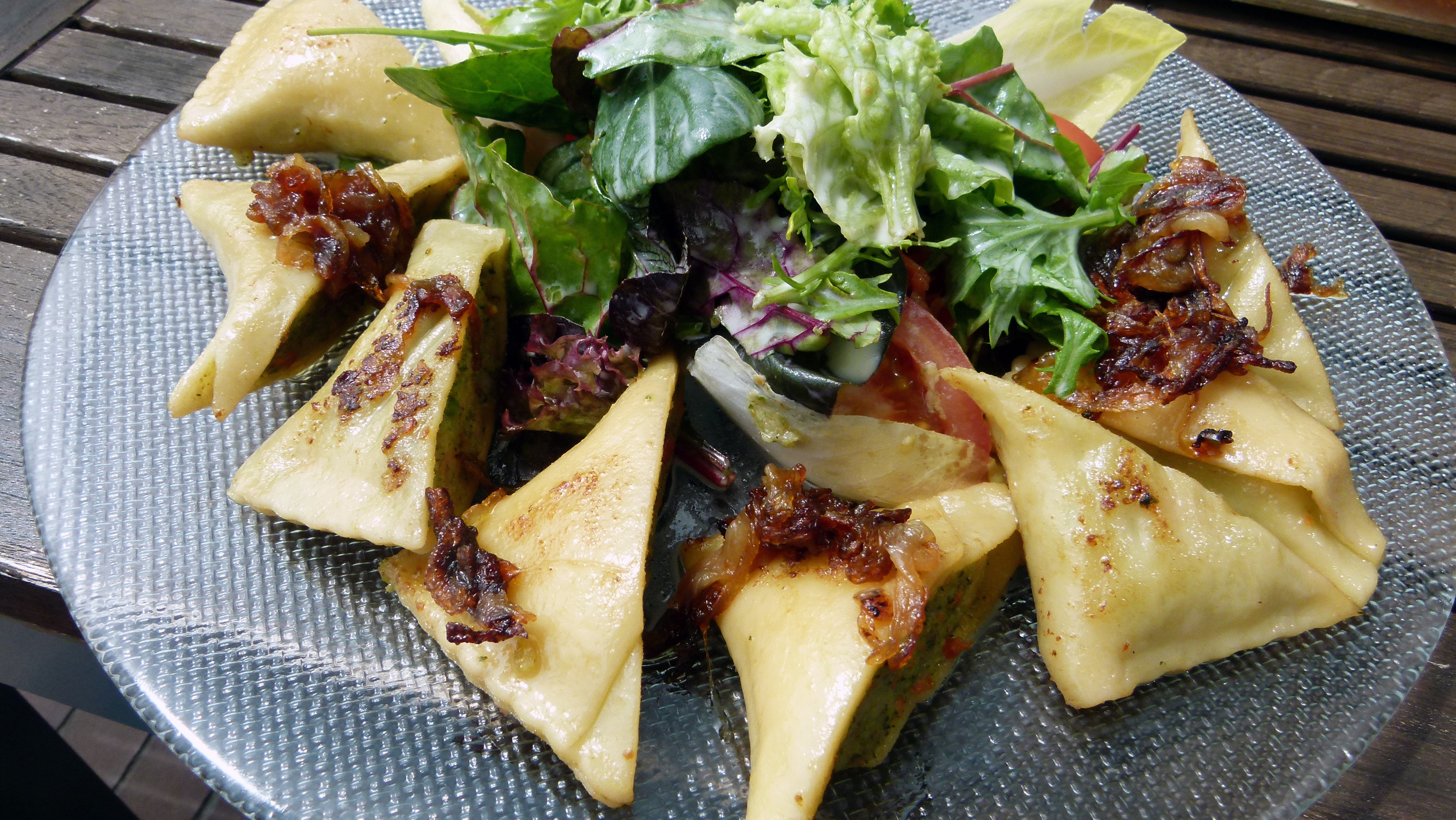
Maultaschen in Baden

The cuisine of the German region of Baden is comparatively light and small among Germany's regional cuisines, but is regarded within the country as among the best. Baden has the highest density of starred-restaurants in Germany.

Baden is situated in volcanic soils and has Germany's warmest climate, permitting strong agricultural production of tobacco, wine, fruit and horticulture, including asparagus and chestnuts. Close proximity to France and Switzerland exert strong influences, including on home-cooking dishes. Some of dishes typical of the region include Baeckeoffe and Flammkuchen, Sauerkraut or Schäufele. Spätzle and egg pasta are made, using more eggs than in the neighboring region of Swabia. The mix of hearty and sweet dishes was adapted from Palatine cuisine, as was the voluminous use of a range of wines in a meal.

The region's fruits support a variety of fruity desserts and pastries, eaten at the German "Kaffee und Kuchen" (lit. "coffee and cake", similar to the British tea time). According to legend, the Baden city of Tübingen was where Black Forest gateau originated.

== Appetizers ==
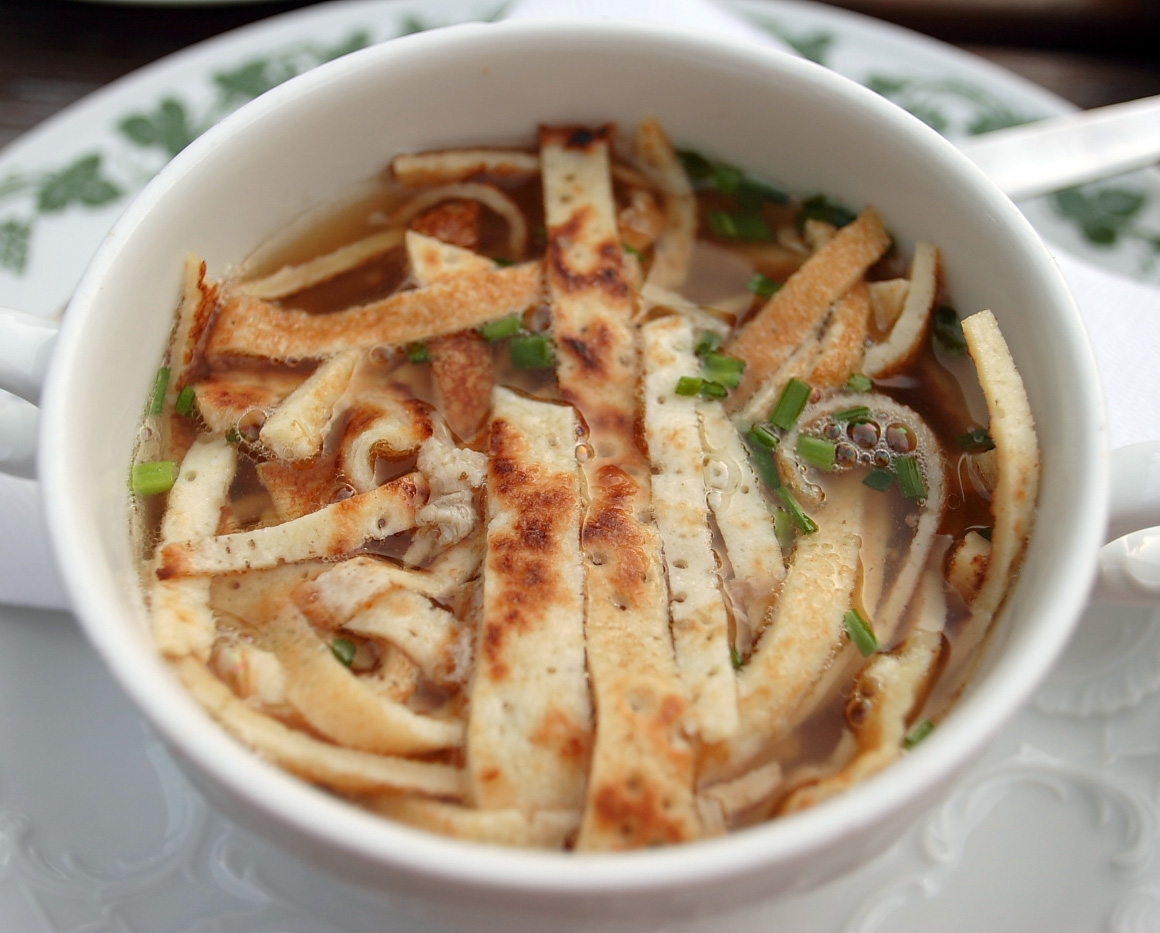
Flädlesuppe

- Flädle soup
- Escargot soup
- Valerianella mit Kracherle
- Egg drop soup (similar to Italian stracciatella)

== Main dishes ==
- Roe deer roast, called "Rehrücken Baden-Baden"
- Sulz
- Egli
- Schäufele
- Landjäger
- Bibbeliskäs (in the South also called "Bibbeleskäs", in the North "white cheese")
- Käsespätzle
- Maultaschen
- Ox breast with horseradish sauce

== Side dishes ==
- Schupfnudeln (Bubespitzle)
- Spätzle (also "Knöpfli")
- Potato salad (usually mixed with a brew of meat broth, vinegar, oil, salt, pepper and mustard, but without mayonnaise)
- Pancake
- "Steamed potato", raw seared potato pieces which are then cooked in water and are subsequently seared once again until they are crispy
- "Rauhbrägeldi", raw home fries
- Pretzel

== Sweet dishes ==
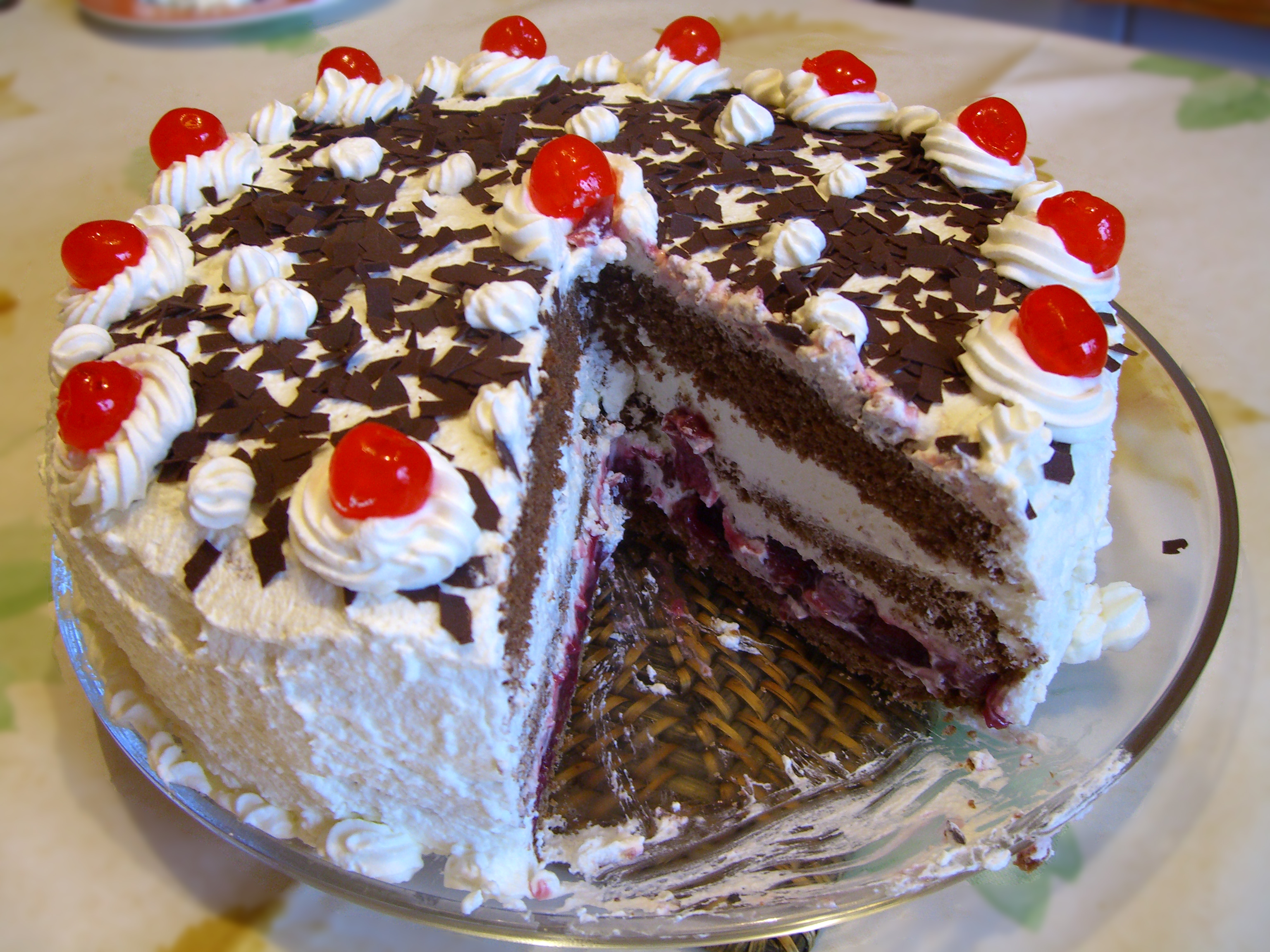
Black Forest cake

- Kirschenmichel
- Covered apple pie
- Badischi Schärbe
- Strübli
- Ofenschlupfer
- Scheiterhaufen
- Schwarzwälder Kirschtorte
- Wähe

== See also ==
- Baden (wine region)
