= Knoephla =

Dumpling often used in soup

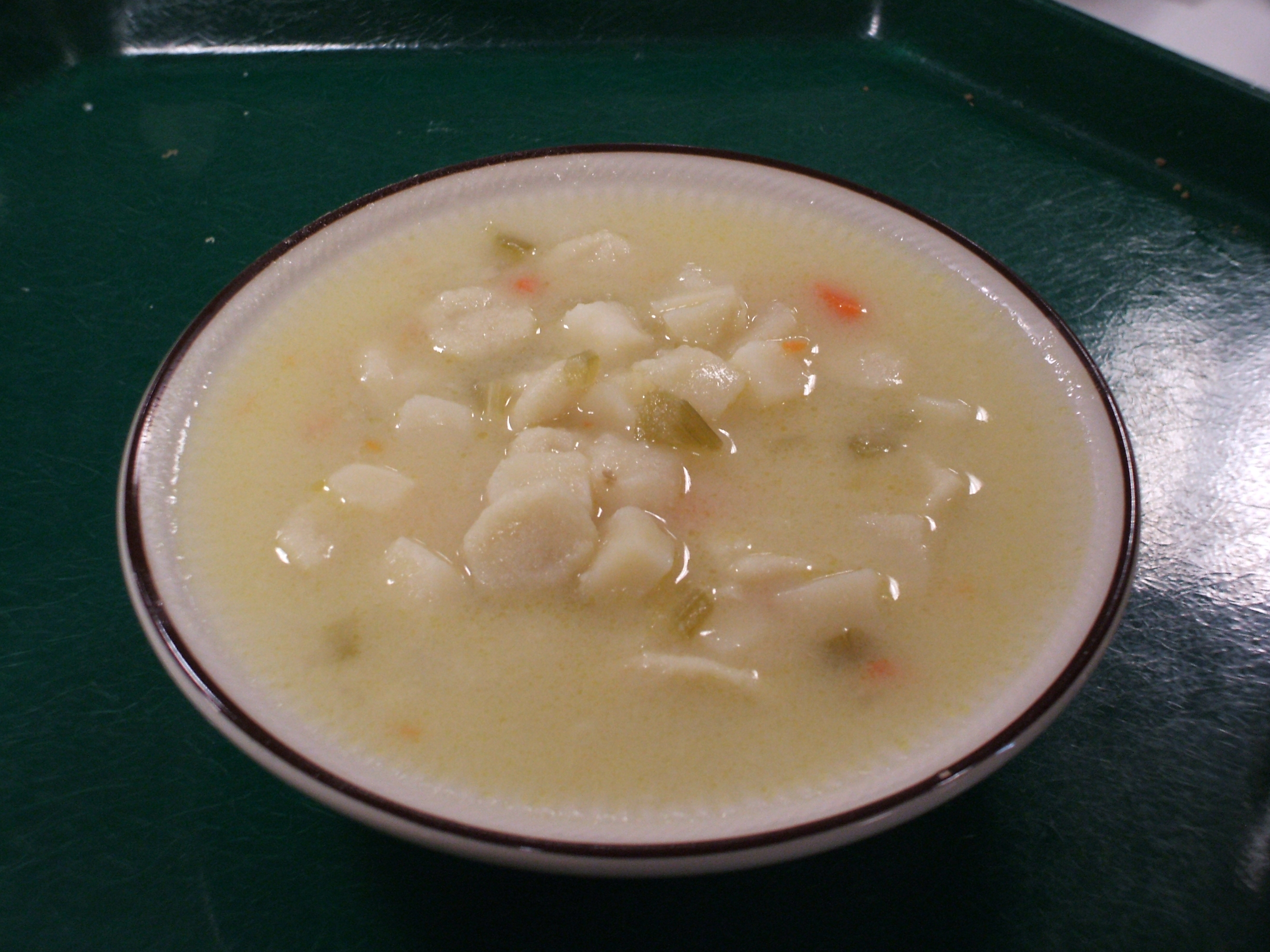
- Knoephla soup at University of North Dakota Terrace Dining Hall.
- Type: Dumpling
- Place of origin: German-Russian
- Region or state: Upper Midwestern United States
- Main ingredients: Potatoes

Knoephla, also spelled knephla /ˈnɛflə/, is a type of dumpling made from flour and water, commonly used in soups in the United States. The word is related to the modern German dialect word Knöpfle, meaning little knob/button.

Traditional knoephla soup is a thick chicken and potato soup with dumplings, almost to the point of being a stew. It is particularly common in the U.S. states of Minnesota, South Dakota, and North Dakota, where there was significant settlement of German emigrants from the Russian Empire. There are different iterations known throughout, though the North Dakotan iteration typically contains just potatoes and dumplings.

== Description ==
Knoephla are small dumplings traditionally used in a soup in the north midwestern United States. Knoephla soup commonly contains ingredients like chicken broth, potatoes, carrots, thyme, celery, butter, and milk.

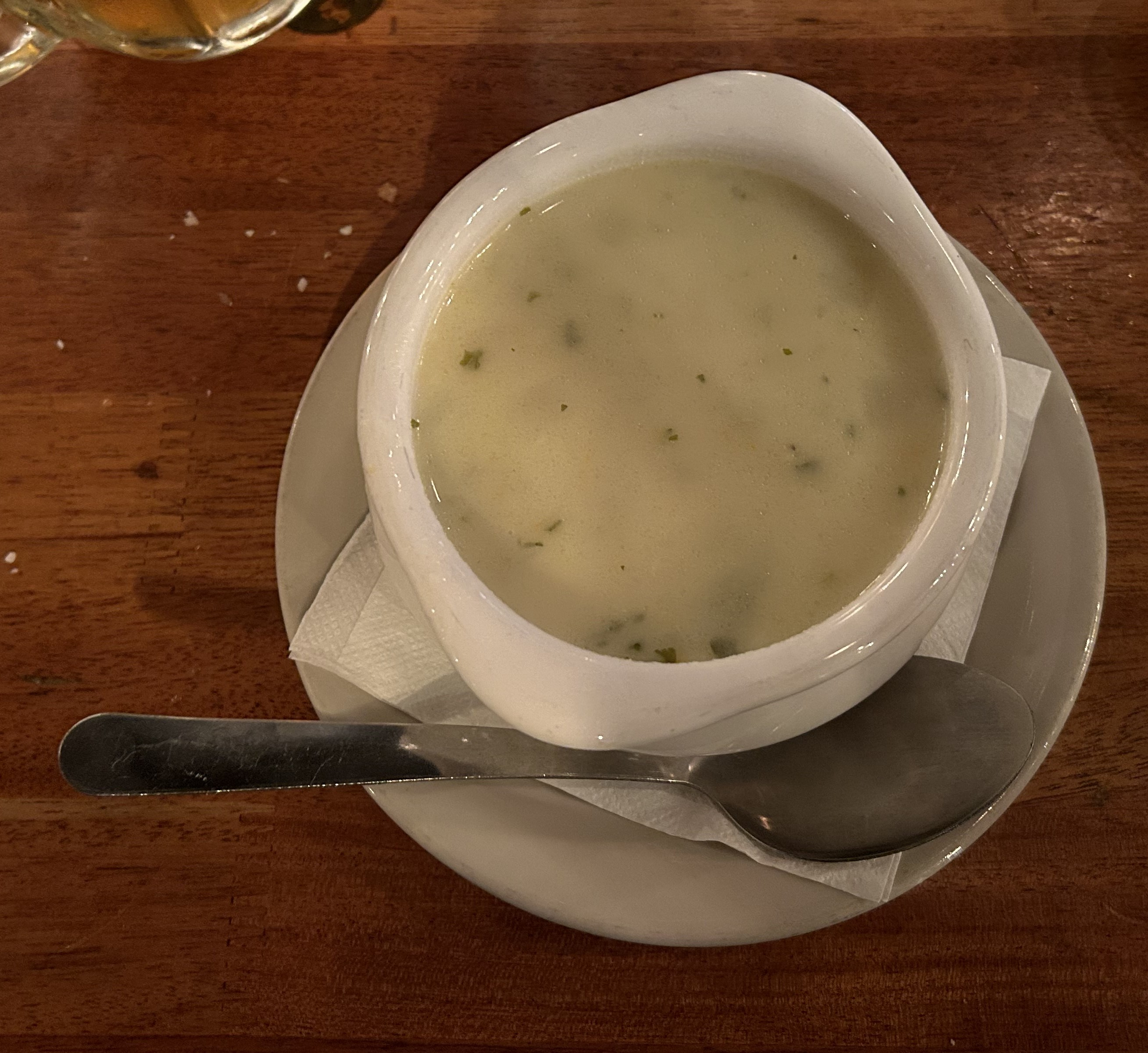
A bowl of knoephla soup

== History ==
Knoephla were brought to the upper Midwest from German-Russian immigrants. Over half of North Dakotans have German ancestry, most of whom came to the United States from the Russian empire. The Germans, typically of Swabian descent, came to the Midwest with the hope of homesteading and religious freedom.

== Non-soup variations ==
In addition to being served in soup, knoephla are sometimes enjoyed in other forms. One variation is knoephla and sauerkraut, which is a dish consisting of knoephla, kielbasa sausage, sauerkraut, potatoes, and onions. Kase knoephla are cheese-filled knoephla dumplings that are similar to pierogis.

== See also ==
- Gnocchi, similar Italian pasta/dumplings
- Halušky, eastern European equivalent of spätzle
- Klöße, larger dumplings
- Passatelli, similar Italian pasta made with bread crumbs in place of flour
- Schupfnudel
- Spätzle
