= Spätzle =

Type of noodles

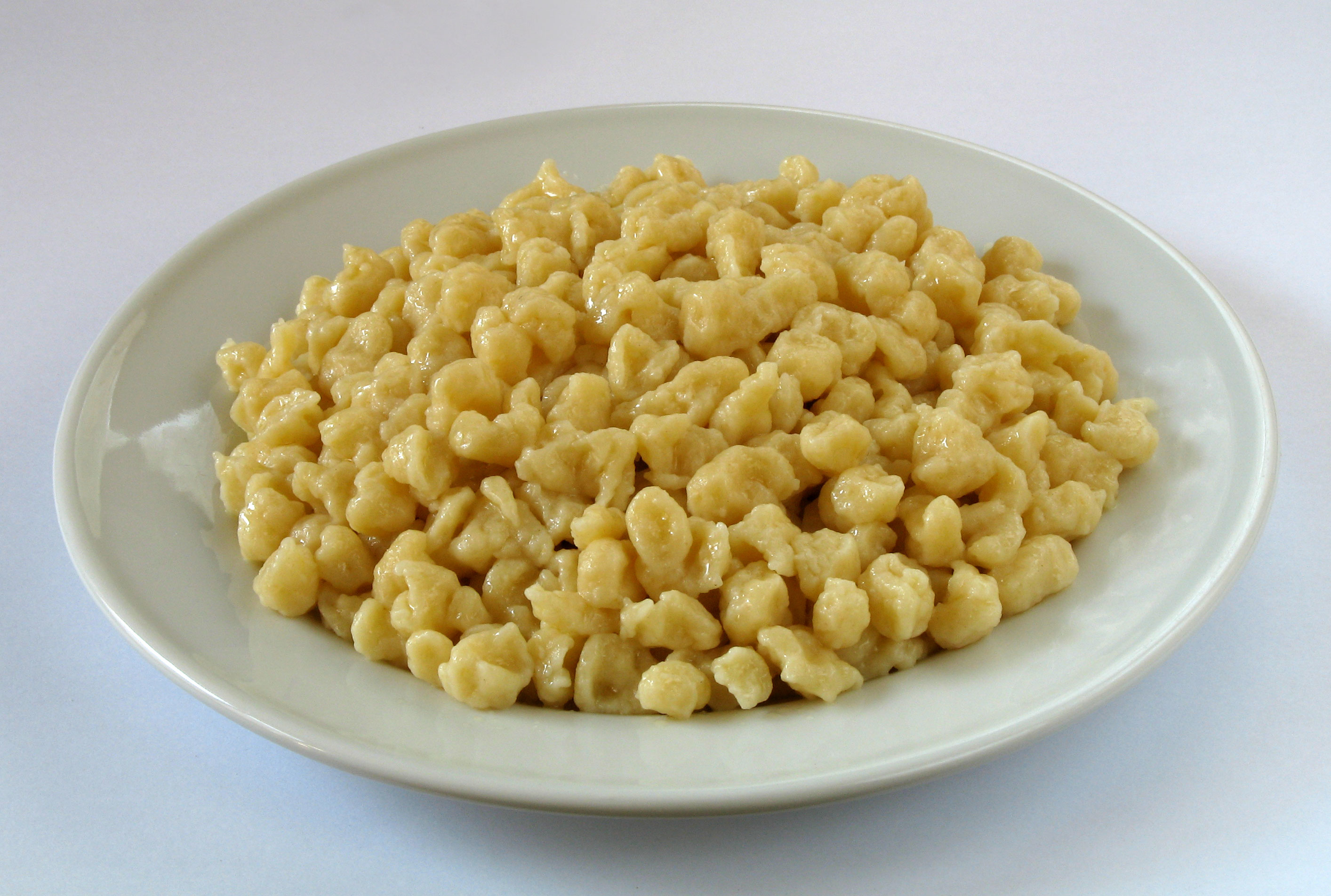
- A bowl of Knöpfle (a variation of Spätzle) without meat or sauce
- Type: Egg noodles
- Place of origin: Swabia; Alsace; Baden
- Main ingredients: Flour, eggs, water

Spätzle (German: [ˈʃpɛtslə]), Spätzla Knöpfle or Spatzen, also called nokedli (Hungarian: [ˈnokɛdli]), are a type of egg pasta typically served as a side for meat dishes with sauce. Commonly associated with Swabia (hence Swabian spaetzle) and Alsace, it is also found in the cuisines of southern Germany and Austria, Switzerland, Liechtenstein, Lorraine, Moselle, Trentino and South Tyrol. It may be served as a side dish or with other ingredients like cheese and onion as a main dish. Spätzle are egg-based pasta of an irregular form with a rough, porous surface. The glutinous dough is put directly into boiling water or steam and the form varies between thin and thick, elongated and short. Spätzle is cooked for the first time during the fabrication. The moist dough is either pressed through a perforated metal plate or it drips through this plate into the boiling water. Other ways to prepare Spätzle are more applicable for domestic use.

A similar round shape, simplified in production, is native to the pre-Alpine Allgäu regions of Bavarian Swabia and Baden-Württemberg as Knöpfle.

== Etymology ==
Spätzle is the Swabian and Alsacian diminutive of Spatz, thus literally 'little sparrow'. Some linguists derive it from the word “clump”, meaning dough which tends to form clots. In Switzerland they are called Spätzli or Chnöpfli. In Hungarian Nokedli or Csipetke, in Slovenian vodni žličniki and in Ladin Fierfuli. The Slovak Halušky (Hungarian: Galuska) is also similar.

Before the use of mechanical devices, the noodles were shaped by hand or with a spoon, and the results resembled Spatzen (plural of Spatz, meaning 'sparrows', 'sparrow' is Spatz or Sperling in German; Spätzle is the diminutive of Spatz, unchanged in plural).

Spätzle used in this context stands in plural form. In the 18th century this dish was referred to as "Wasserspatzen" (meaning "water sparrows"). In Switzerland and in Markgräflerland (Margraves’ Land) the dish is called "Spätzli" or "Chnöpfli" and in the Low Alemannic area "Knöpfle" or "Knepfli". In Northern Austria, Spätzle are called "Nockerln" (as in the dish Eiernockerl) whereas dumplings are also referred to as "Nocken" in Carinthia and Tyrol.

Spätzle which went wrong, which are very lumpy or stick together are also called (in German) “raven”, “little stork”, “black horse”, “nightingale”, “grandfather” or “eagle”.

They are also known as Knöpfle (diminutive of button) which describes the compact, round form of the noodle. Depending on the form, some regions differentiate between Spätzle (the length exceeds the diameter by more than fourfold) and Knöpfle (the relation of length to diameter is under two). In everyday language usage, the two names refer to the same product made from the same dough and are interchangeable. There is no clear distinction between how the two names are used, and usage varies from region to region (for example, in Alsace, Knöple are typically larger than Spätzle).

== History ==
The tradition of making Spätzle can be traced back to the 18th century, although medieval illustrations are believed to place the noodle at an even earlier date. In 1725, Rosino Lentilio, a councillor and personal physician from Württemberg, concluded that Knöpflein and Spazen were "all the things that are made from flour". Spelt was grown widely in the Swabian-Alemannic area at the time. The cereal grew on poor soils and was very popular in the region, which was home to small farmers and characterised by poverty. As spelt flour contains high levels of gluten protein, and the dough could therefore be made in times of hardship without the need for eggs, Schwäbische Spätzle/Schwäbische Knöpfle were mainly made from spelt. The product achieved fame in the Münsinger Alb upland area. As industrialisation began and prosperity increased, the noodles went from an ordinary, everyday food item to a culinary specialty eaten on feast days. In a description of a Swabian farmers' village written in 1937, Spätzle are described as a festive food. The great importance of Schwäbische Spätzle/Schwäbische Knöpfle in Swabian cooking can be seen, inter alia, from the 1827 novel Die Geschichte von den Sieben Schwaben, according to which the custom in Swabia is "to eat five times a day, five times soup, twice with Knöpfle or Spätzle".

In the early 21st century, Spätzle are largely considered a "Swabian speciality" and are generally associated with the German state of Baden-Württemberg. In France, they are associated with Alsace and Moselle. Germany's estimated annual commercial production of Spätzle is approximately 40,000 tons. Pre-made Spätzle are also available internationally.

=== Swabian culture ===
In Swabian literature, there is a multitude of poems about “the favourite dish of the Swabian people”. Examples are poems such as "Das Lob der Schwabenknöpfle" (The Praise of Swabian Knöpfle) which was published in the regional newspaper Schwarzwälder Bote (Black Forest Messenger) in 1838, the poem "Schwäbische Leibspeisa" (The Swabian Favourite Dish) or the “Spätzles-Lied” (The Spätzle Song).

The manufacturing of Spätzle in Swabia can be traced back to the 18th century. In 1725 the Württembergian council and private physician Lentilius defined "Knöpflein" and "Spatzen" as "everything that is made from flour". Back then, spelt was widely used in Swabia and Alemannia. Since the region was marked by rural peasant structures and poverty, the undemanding grain spelt was very popular since it also thrives in low-nutrient soil. Spelt is high in gluten, so in times of scarcity it could be made into a dough without the addition of eggs. Consequently, it is the flour most commonly used in the preparation of Spätzle.

Traditionally, Spätzle are scraped manually on a board, which is still considered a special certification mark. For efficiency reasons, a mechanical production of "homemade" Spätzle comparable with manually scraped ones emerged at the start of the 20th century. With the beginning of industrialisation and progressing prosperity, Spätzle advanced from everyday food to a delicacy eaten during the holidays. People from a Swabian farming village called it a festive dish in 1937. One year prior, regional poet Sebastian Blau (Josef Eberle's pseudonym) rendered Spätzle a symbol of Swabian identity: "… Spätzle are the foundation of our cuisine, the glory of our country, … the be-all and end-all of the Swabian menu…".

Nowadays, Swabian Spätzle or Knöpfle can be found in nearly every product ranges of Swabian pasta producers and since the 1980s, they also have been successfully exported. They are mentioned in many Swabian traditions and celebrations and also form part of tourist activities in terms of culinary specialty weeks or courses, seminars and competitions where Spätzle are scraped (made). There are many cooking competitions and various world records in "Spätzleschaben" (Spätzle scraping). A number of exhibitions document the traditional knowledge of the making of Spätzle in the Swabian region from the very beginnings until today. The great importance of Spätzle for the Swabian kitchen is proofed by the novel Die Geschichte von den sieben Schwaben (The history of the seven Swabians), published in 1827, according to which in Swabia exists the tradition "of eating five times a day, which means five times soup, and two times the soup is accompanied by Knöpfle or Spätzle".

In 1892, Elise Henle explained that a Swabian woman should be able to manufacture Spätzle: "s isch koi richtigs Schwobe-Mädla, des net Spätzla kocha ka" ("'tis not a real Swabian girl, who isn't able to cook Spätzle"). For the modern era the Swabian author Siegfried Ruoß lists more than 50 different Spätzle recipes in his cookbook "Schwäbische Spätzleküche". In Bad Waldsee, in upper-Swabia, there is a Spätzle museum since 2013.

The earliest recipes for Spätzle can be found in the so-called "Göppinger Kochbuch", which was composed by Rosina Dorothea Knör (1733–1809) in 1783.

== Protected geographical indication ==
Since March 2012, Swabian Spätzle and Swabian Knöpfle have been awarded the EU quality seal for protected geographical indication (PGI) and are protected throughout Europe as a regional specialty. To be able to bear this sign, one of the production stages of the product must have taken place in the respectively defined region of origin.

== Preparation ==
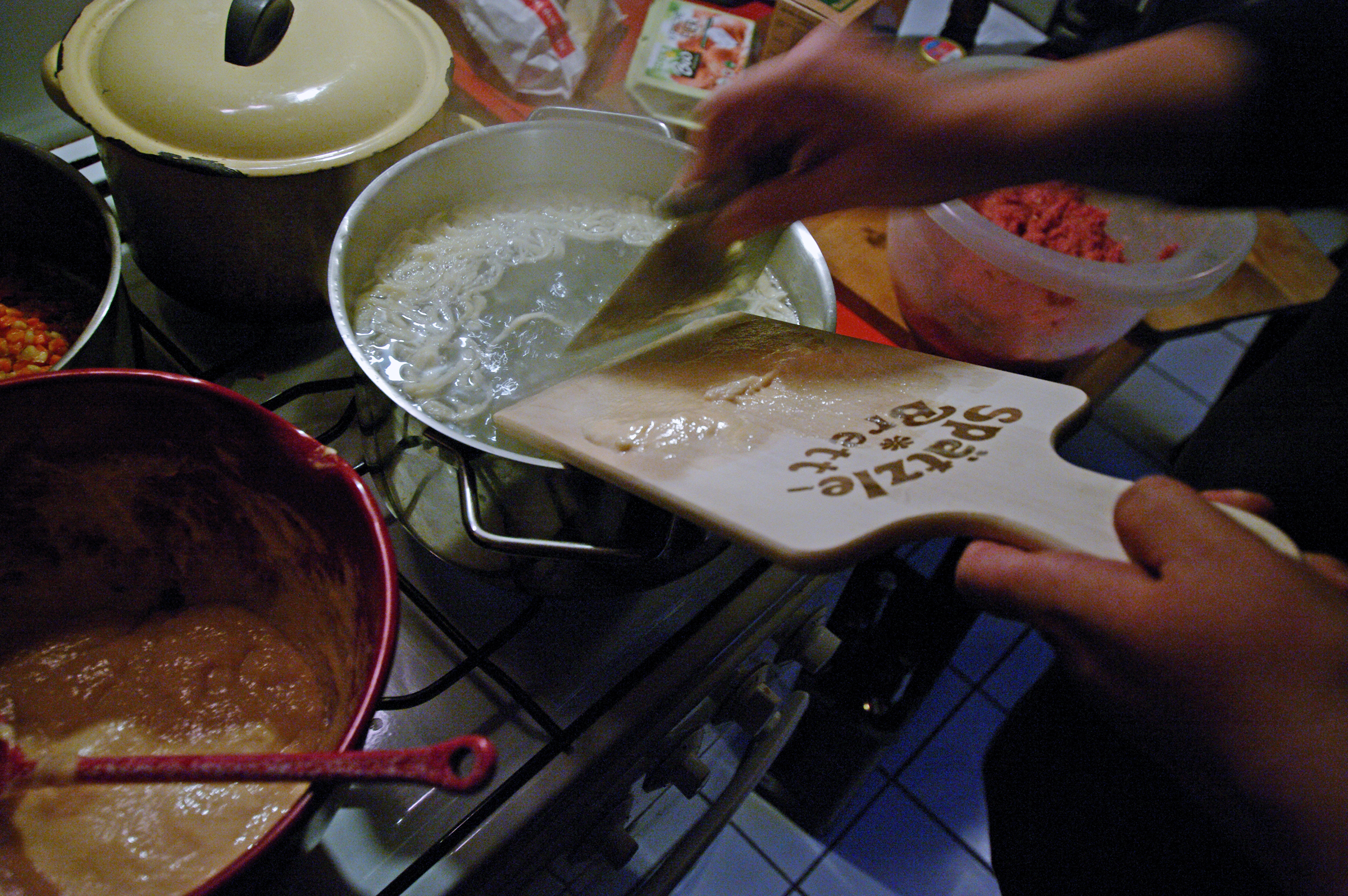
Manual process by scraping from a board

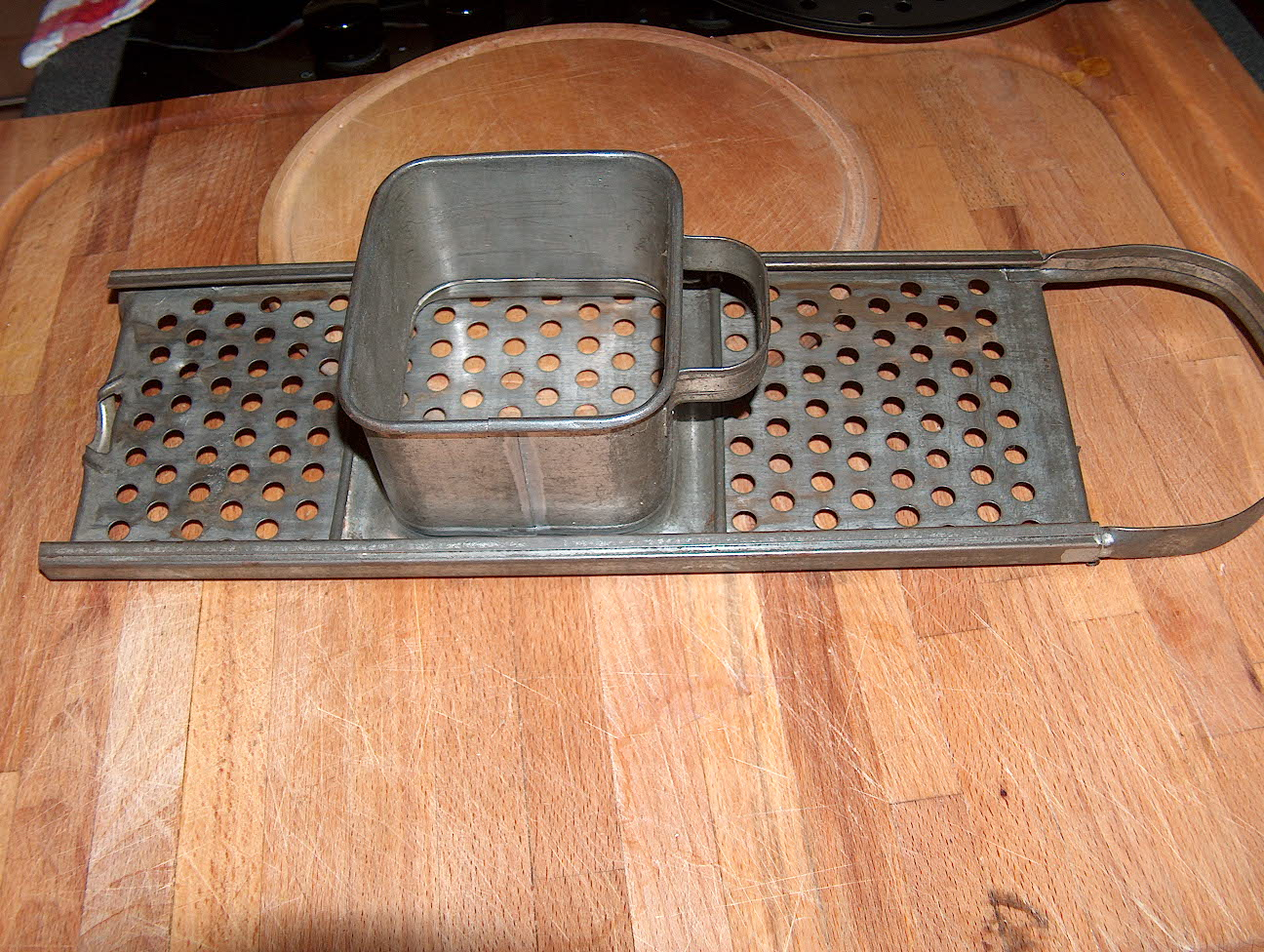
A "hopper" type Spätzle maker (Spätzlehobel)

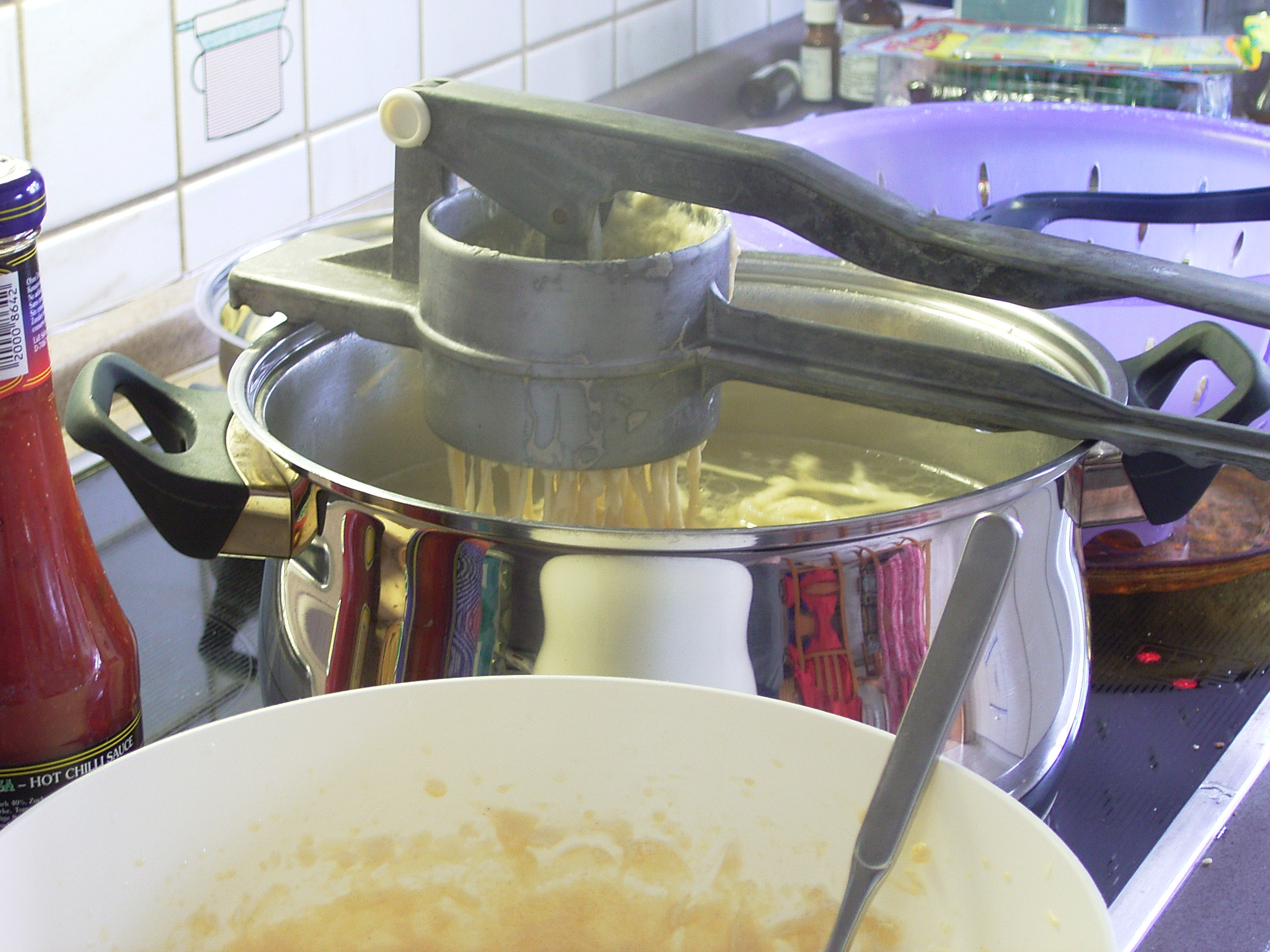
A "potato ricer" type Spätzle maker (Spätzlepresse)

Spätzle is a type of dumpling or noodle. Its dough typically consists of few ingredients, principally eggs, flour, and salt. The Swabian rule of thumb is to use a number of eggs equal to the number of servings, plus one. Water is often added to produce a runnier dough. The flour traditionally used for Spätzle is bread wheat (not the durum wheat used for Italian pasta); however, a more coarsely milled type is used for Spätzle-making than for baking. This flour type is known as Dunst, similar to US "first clear" or Czech hrubá type. This gives a chewier texture but can produce a dough too crumbly for scraping if no water is added, particularly when cutting short on eggs for dietary reasons. If fine ("all-purpose") flour and the full amount of eggs are used, all fat and moisture in the dough is derived from these, and water is rarely necessary.

Traditionally, Spätzle are made by scraping long, thin strips of dough off a wooden (sometimes wet) chopping board (Spätzlebrett) into boiling salted water, where they cook until they rise to the surface. Altogether, the dough should thus be as viscous as to slowly flow apart if cut into strips with a knife, yet hold the initial shape for some seconds. If dropped into boiling water, the albumen will congeal quickly in the boiling water, while the yolk will keep the dough succulent. After the pasta has become firm, they are skimmed and put aside.

Since this can be a cumbersome way to prepare Spätzle, several devices were invented to facilitate cooking that resemble a strainer or colander, potato ricer (Spätzlepresse), food mill, or coarse grater (Spätzlehobel). As with scraped Spätzle, the dough drops into the boiling water. Those instruments that use muscle pressure in addition to gravity can be used with a firmer dough; that for a Spätzlehobel should be as "runny" as the one for scraping.

=== Dough varieties ===
For certain specialty dishes, the dough may be enriched with minced pork liver (resulting in Leberspätzle), spinach or finely grated cheese.

== Dishes ==
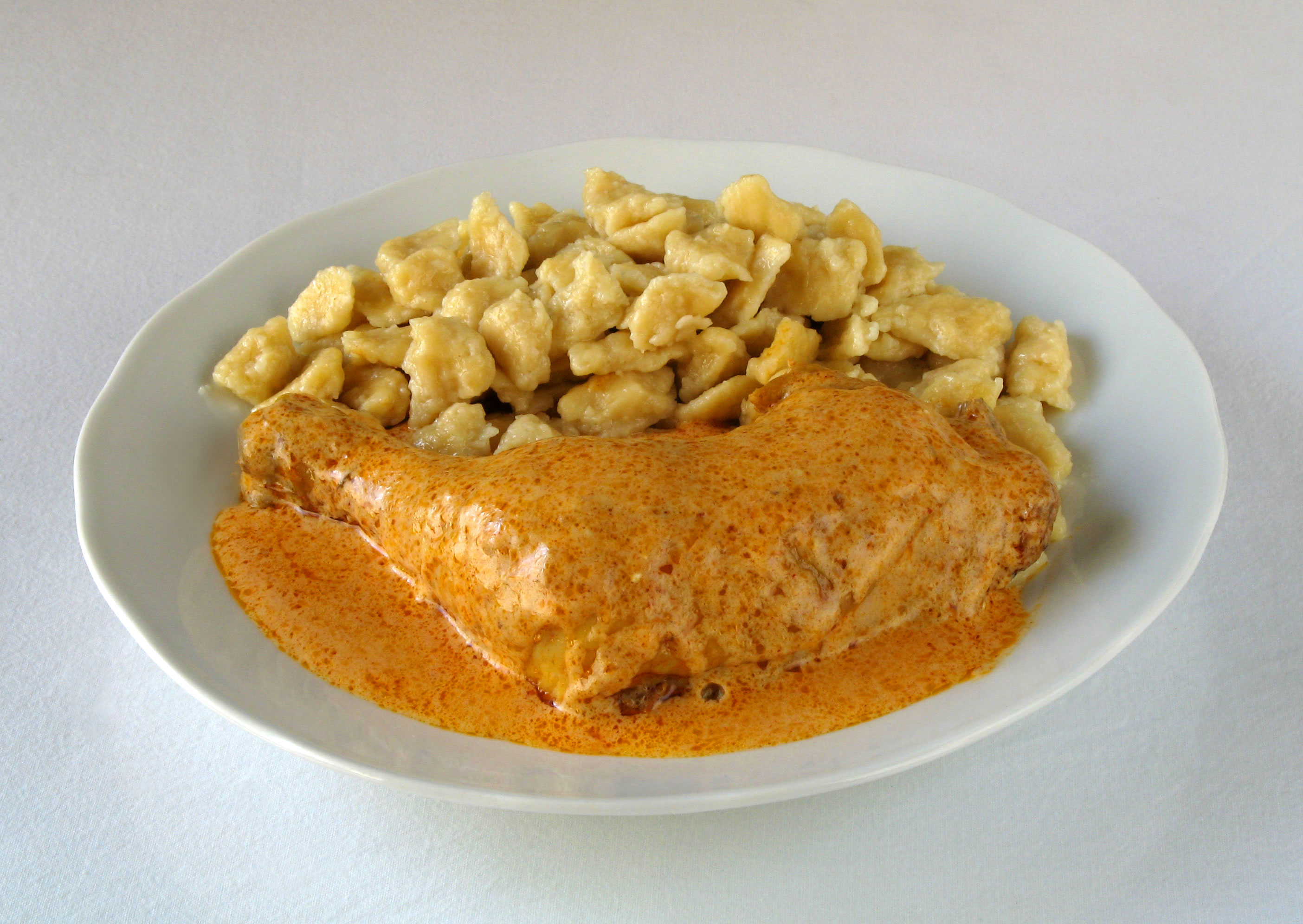
Hungarian chicken paprikash with Spätzle (Hungarian nokedli)

Spätzle typically accompanies meat dishes prepared with an abundant sauce or gravy, such as Zwiebelrostbraten, Sauerbraten, Jägerschnitzel or Rouladen. In Hungary, Spätzle often are used in soup. Spätzle also are used as a primary ingredient in dishes including:

Savory

- Linsen mit Spätzle und Saitenwürstle: Spätzle with lentils and fine-skinned, Viennese-style sausages
- Käsespätzle: Spätzle mixed with grated cheese (typically Emmentaler) and fried onion
- Gaisburger Marsch: traditional Swabian beef stew with potatoes and carrots
- Krautspätzle: Spätzle mixed with sauerkraut, onion, butter and spices such as marjoram and/or caraway
- Spätzle mit Käse überbacken: Spätzle mixed with cheese and topped with paprika
- Leberspätzle: Spätzle mixed with ground liver often served as a soup with a clear broth
- Spinatspatzeln (Tyrolean dialect): Spätzle which also contains spinach as one of the ingredients; a speciality of Trentino-Alto Adige/Südtirol
- Roast Spätzle: are baked until golden brown and are a pure soup ingredient.
- Brätspätzle soup: soup with roasted Spätzle.
- Spelt Spätzle: are made of spelt flour.
- Egg Spätzle: The Spätzle are tossed in a pan with melted butter and are mixed with scrambled eggs.
- Spicy Spätzle stew: minced meat, onions and cabbage or rather chicory are brought to the boil and are mixed with Spätzle.
- Potato Spätzle: grated, cooked potatoes are added to the Spätzle dough.
- Cheese Spätzle: probably the most famous Spätzle dish. These have a special tradition as Kässpätzle or Kässpatza in Upper Swabia and especially in the Swabian Jura. Traditionally they are served with green salad. In the Allgäu and Vorarlberg, they are modified as "Käsknöpfle". Many of these variants have something in common: Spätzle, onions and different types of cheese are layered. Typical types of cheese are Emmental and mountain cheese, but also beer cheese or Vorarlberg mountain cheese. Supplements are usually green salads or potato salad. In the uplands of Vorarlberg or in Liechtenstein, it is common to add applesauce. Rests of Cheese Spätzle can be fried in a pan with butter.
- Herbal-Spätzle: finely chopped herbs, as parsley, lovage, tarragon or sorrel are added to the Spätzle dough.
- Cabbage Spätzle: Spätzle are heated together with Sauerkraut and bacon in a pan until the cabbage gets partly brown.
- Liver Spätzle: consist of a dough, which additionally contains pureed, raw liver. They are served with fried onions or are added to a soup.
- "Pinzgauer Kasnockn": a variant of cheese Spätzle in Salzburg, served with beer cheese from Pinzgau, a spicy and strong-smelling specialty.
- Ham Spätzle with cream sauce: Spätzle are mixed with a sauce consisting of boiled ham and cream.
- Spätzle casserole: Spätzle are mixed with ham and stewed cabbage and baked with cheese.
- Spätzle stew: Spätzle are added to a meat and vegetable soup.
- Spätzle Omelette: eggs and ham are fried together with Spätzle.
- Spätzle pancake: Spätzle or rather "Knöpfle" are roasted like potato pancakes.
- Spinach Spätzle: consist of a dough, to which finely chopped spinach, and just recently wild garlic, is added. It is served with bacon cubes or a sauce consisting of ham and cream.
- "Troffi": consist of a dough, which is additionally dosed with pesto. This variant is resident in Upper Italy.
- Onion Spätzle: crushed onions are added to the dough.

Sweet

- Kirschspätzle: Spätzle mixed with fresh cherries, dressed with browned butter, sugar, and cinnamon and/or nutmeg. In the Allgäu, this is served as a one-dish supper in late summer.
- Apfelspätzle: Spätzle with grated apples in the dough, dressed with browned butter, sugar, and cinnamon. In the Allgäu, this is served as a one-dish supper in autumn.
- Spätzle with dried plums: a dessert with layers of Spätzle or rather “Knöpfle” as well as dried plums, which is refined with melted butter as wells as with sugar and cinnamon.
- Poppy Spätzle: Spätzle are roasted together with ground poppy seeds and sugar in a pan.
- Milk Spätzle: together with boiled milk and eggs, the Spätzle provide a basis for a dessert with applesauce or boiled dried fruits.
- Hazelnut Spätzle: roasted and with ground hazelnuts.
- Apple Spätzle: a sweet variant, which can be found in the Allgäu and in the region of the Lake Constance. Steamed slices of apple or rather stewed apple are added to roasted Spätzle which is then sprinkled with sugar or cinnamon.
- Nokedli (galuska): Romani people have their own version of the dish.

== Gallery ==
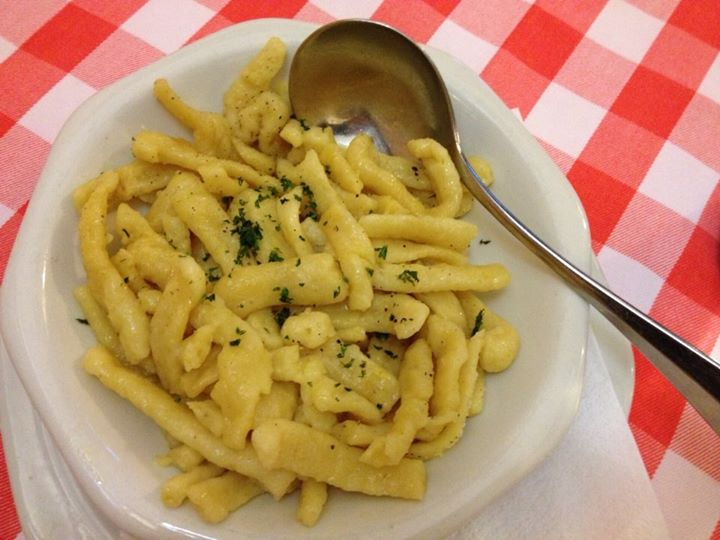
Spätzle

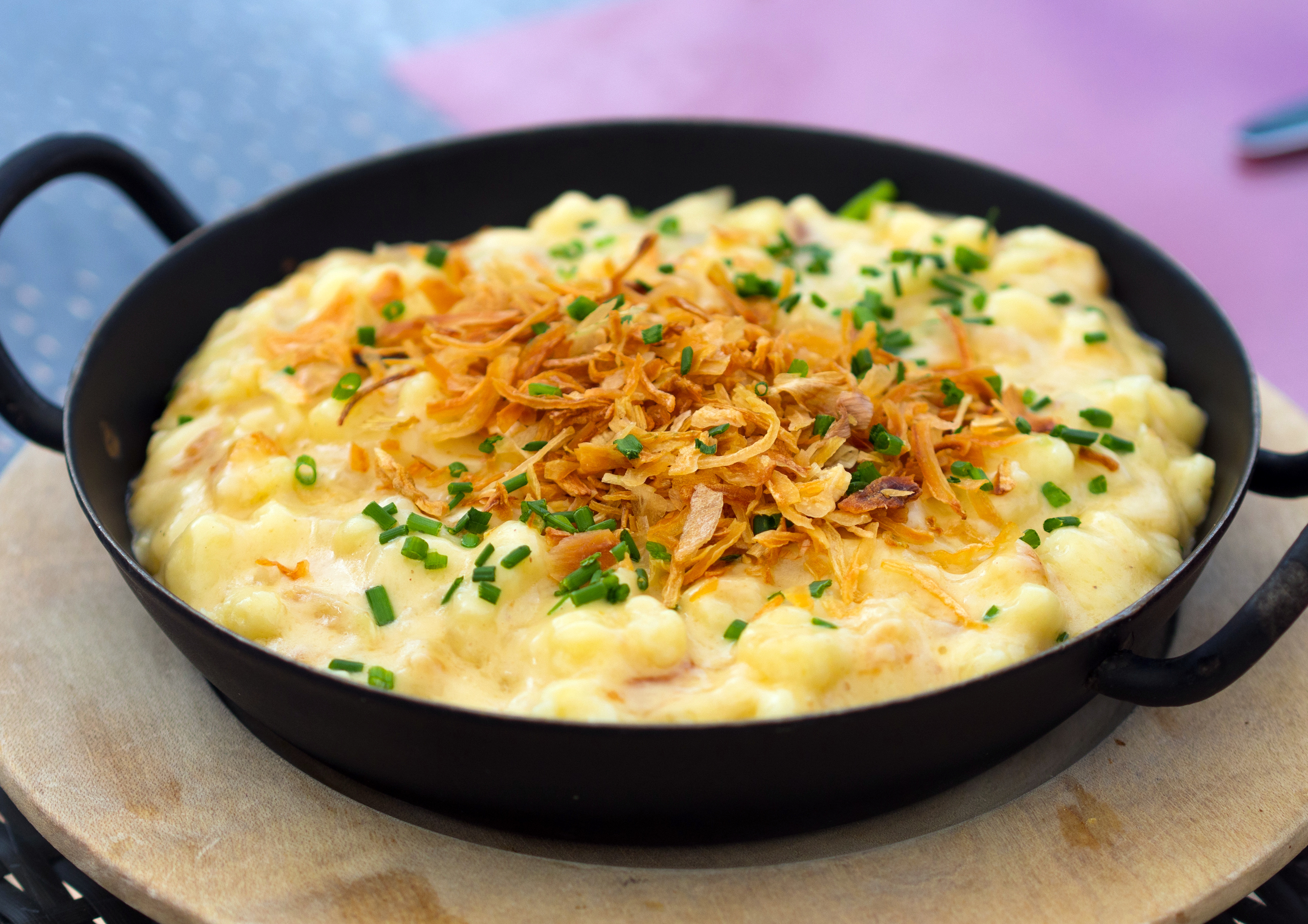
Käsespätzle (cheese Spätzle), Spätzle with cheese and onions

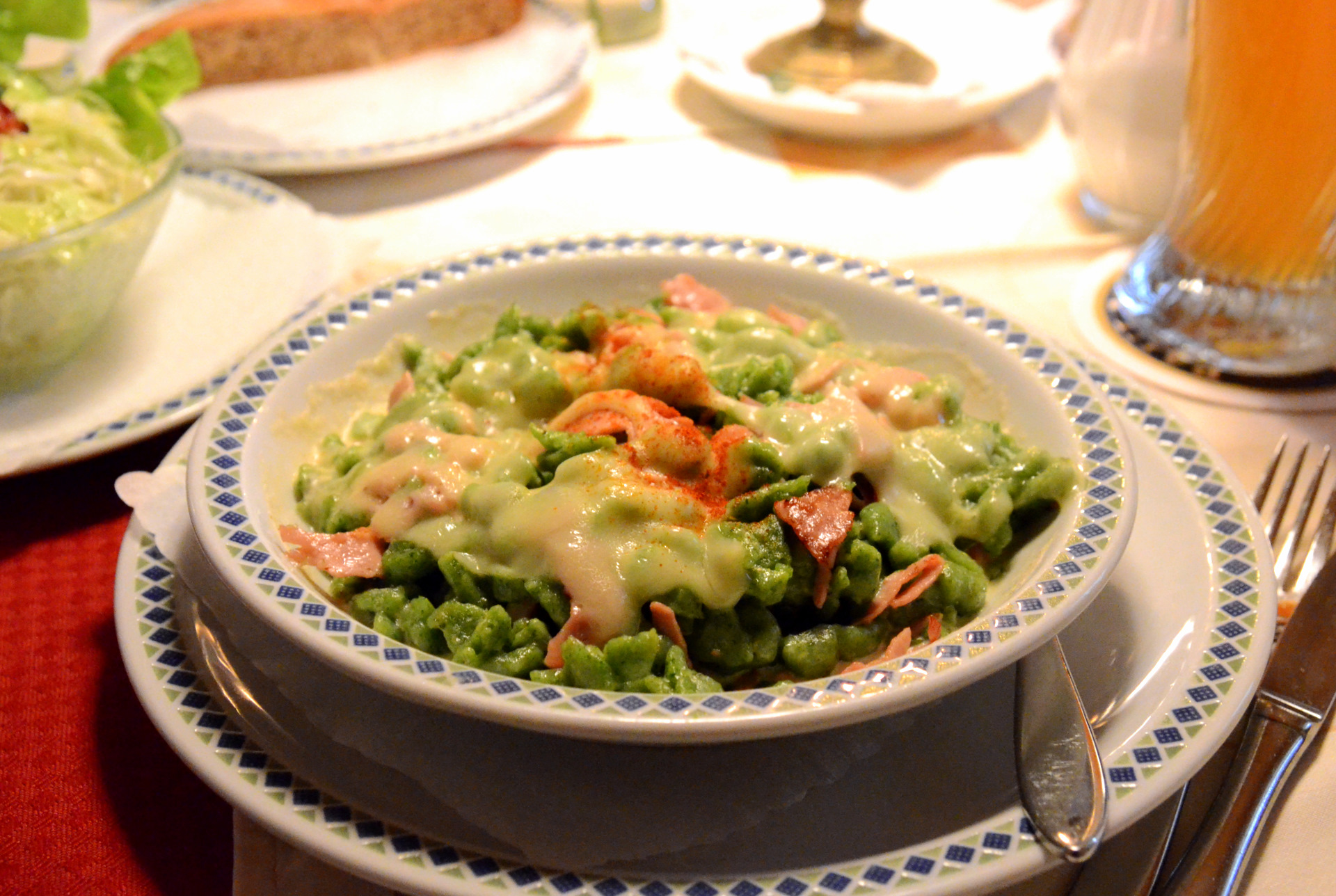
Spinatspätzla

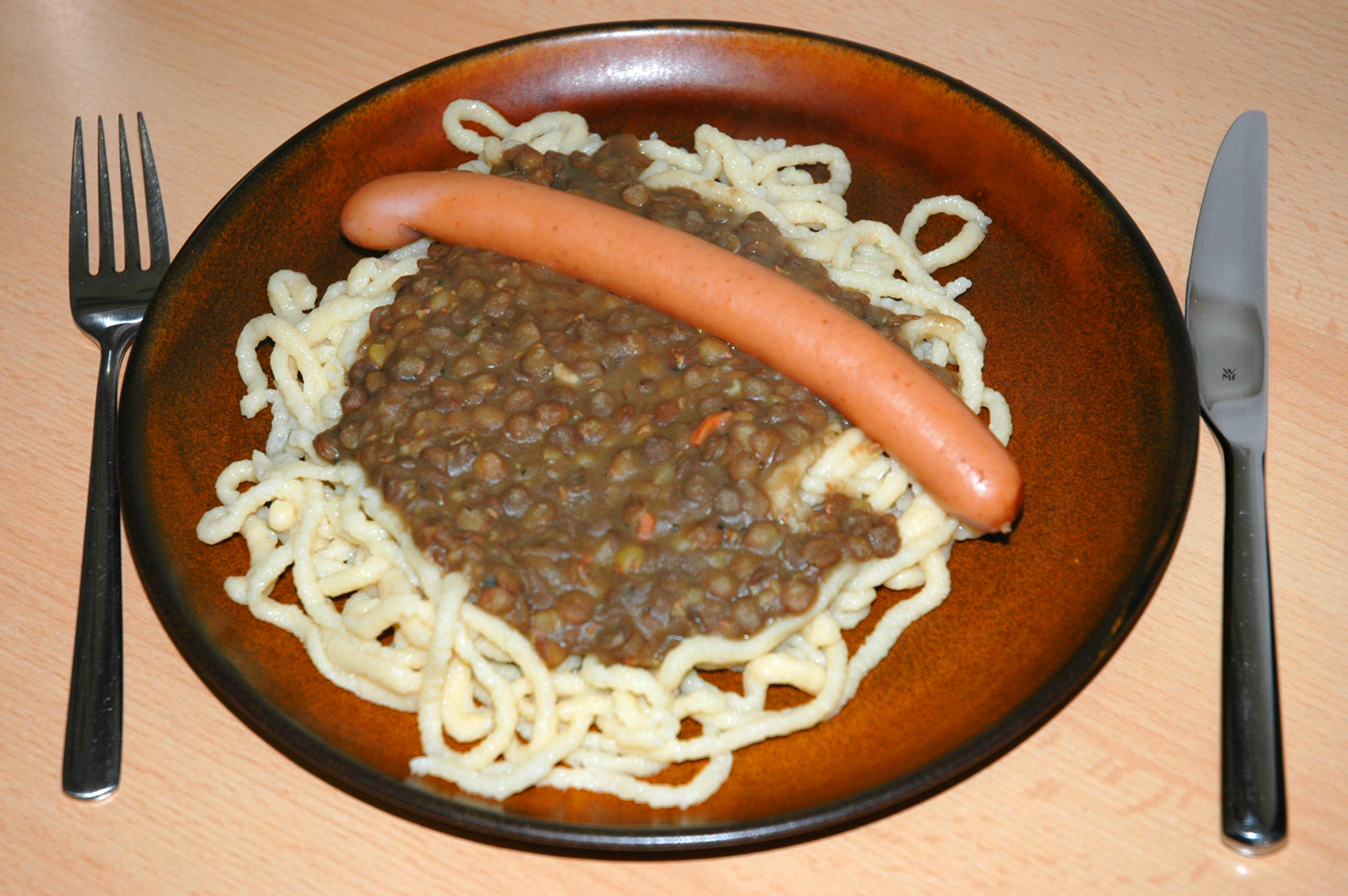
Lentils, Spätzle, and Saitenwürstle

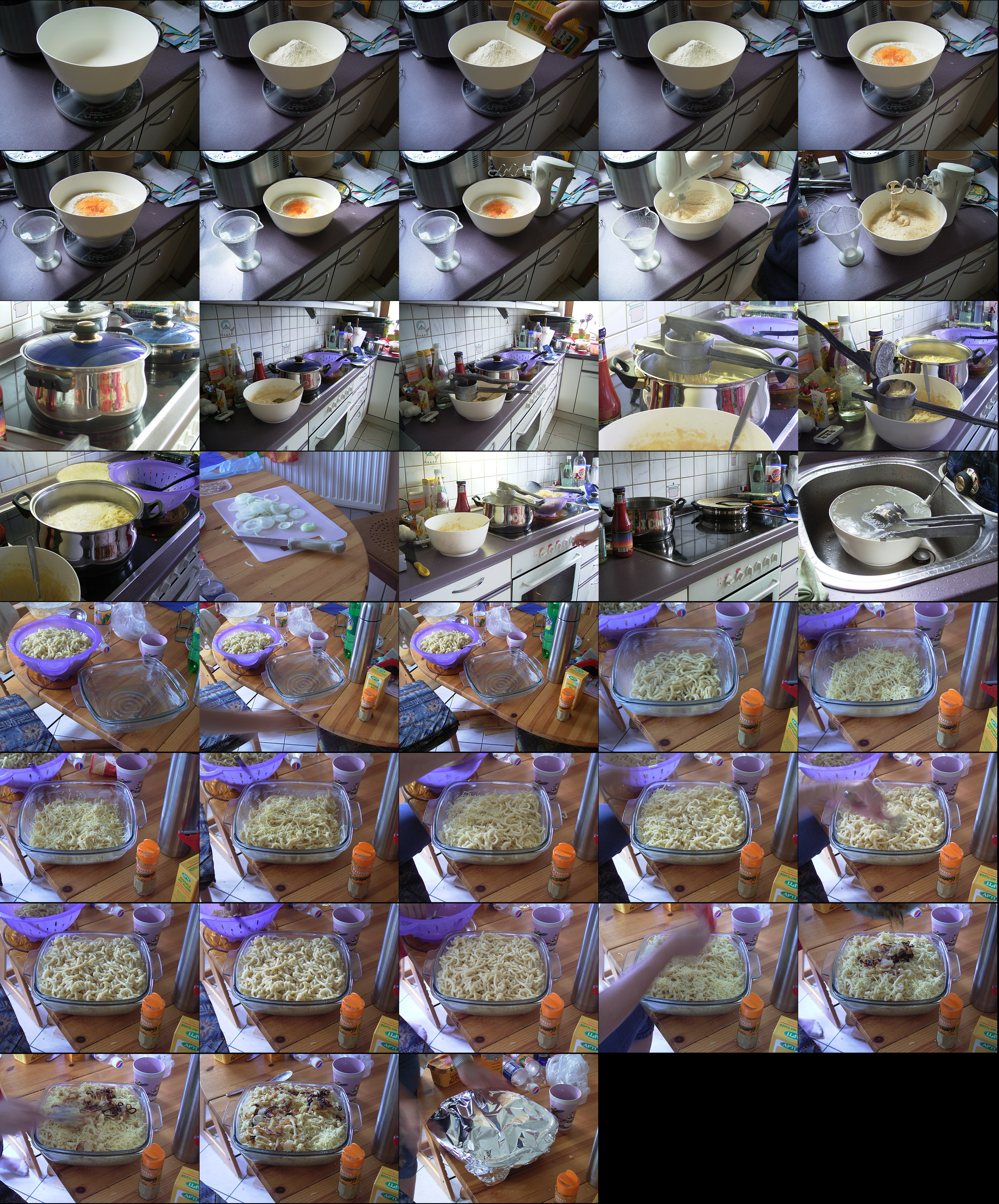
Preparation of Käsespätzle using a Spätzlepresse

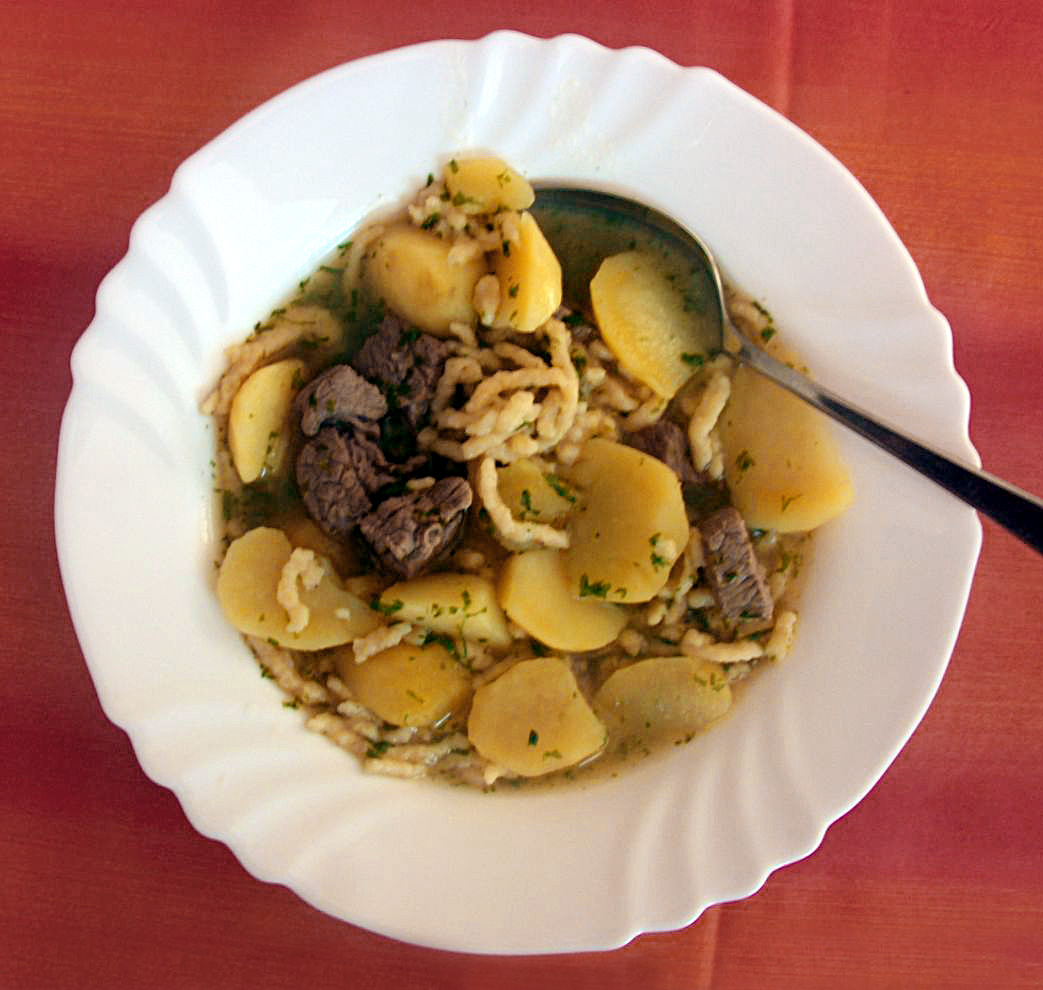
Gaisburger Marsch

== See also ==
- Gnocchi – similar Italian pasta/dumplings
- Halušky – eastern European equivalent of Spätzle
- Klöße – larger dumplings
- Knoephla
- Passatelli – similar Italian pasta made with breadcrumbs in place of flour
- Schupfnudel

== Bibliography ==
- Siegfried Ruoß, Schwäbische Spätzlesküche, Stuttgart 2001, Konrad Theiss Verlag GmbH, ISBN 3-8062-1603-7
- Roswitha Liebenstein, Alles über Allgäuer Spätzle, Kempten/Allgäu 2003, AVA Verlag Allgäu GmbH, ISBN 3-936208-46-8
- [Rosina Dorothea Knör, verwitwete Schmidlin, geb. Dertinger]: Sammlung vieler Vorschriften von allerley Koch- und Backwerk für junge Frauenzimmer, von einer Freundin der Kochkunst. [1. Auflage.] [Göppingen] 1783. ([Göppinger Kochbuch, 1].) [Enthält ein Rezept für Spätzle das manchen als frühestes bekanntes gilt.]
- [Rosina Dorothea Knör, verwitwete Schmidlin, geb. Dertinger]: Göppinger Kochbuch Zweyter Theil oder Neue Sammlung von Fastenspeisen und allerley Koch- und Backwerk für junges Frauenzimmer von einer Freundin der Kochkunst in Göppingen. Stuttgart, bey [Carl Christoph] Erhard und [Franz Christian] Löflund, 1790. (Göppinger Kochbuch, 2.)
- [Rosina Dorothea Knör, verwitwete Schmidlin, geb. Dertinger]: Neues Göppinger Kochbuch [Auszug]. Rezepte aus der 200 Jahre alten Sammlung vieler Vorschriften von allerley Koch- und Backwerk für junges Frauenzimmer von einer Freundin der Kochkunst in Göppingen. Ausgewählt und neu bearbeitet von Lilly Link und Ute Stumpp [...] und [mit] einem kulturgeschichtlichen Beitrag über das „Göppinger Kochbuch“ und seine Verfasserin von Karl-Heinz Rueß. Göppingen (1998) (Veröffentlichungen des Göppinger Stadtarchivs, Bd. 37). – 2. Auflage Göppingen 2000.
