= Hair's breadth =

Informal small unit of length

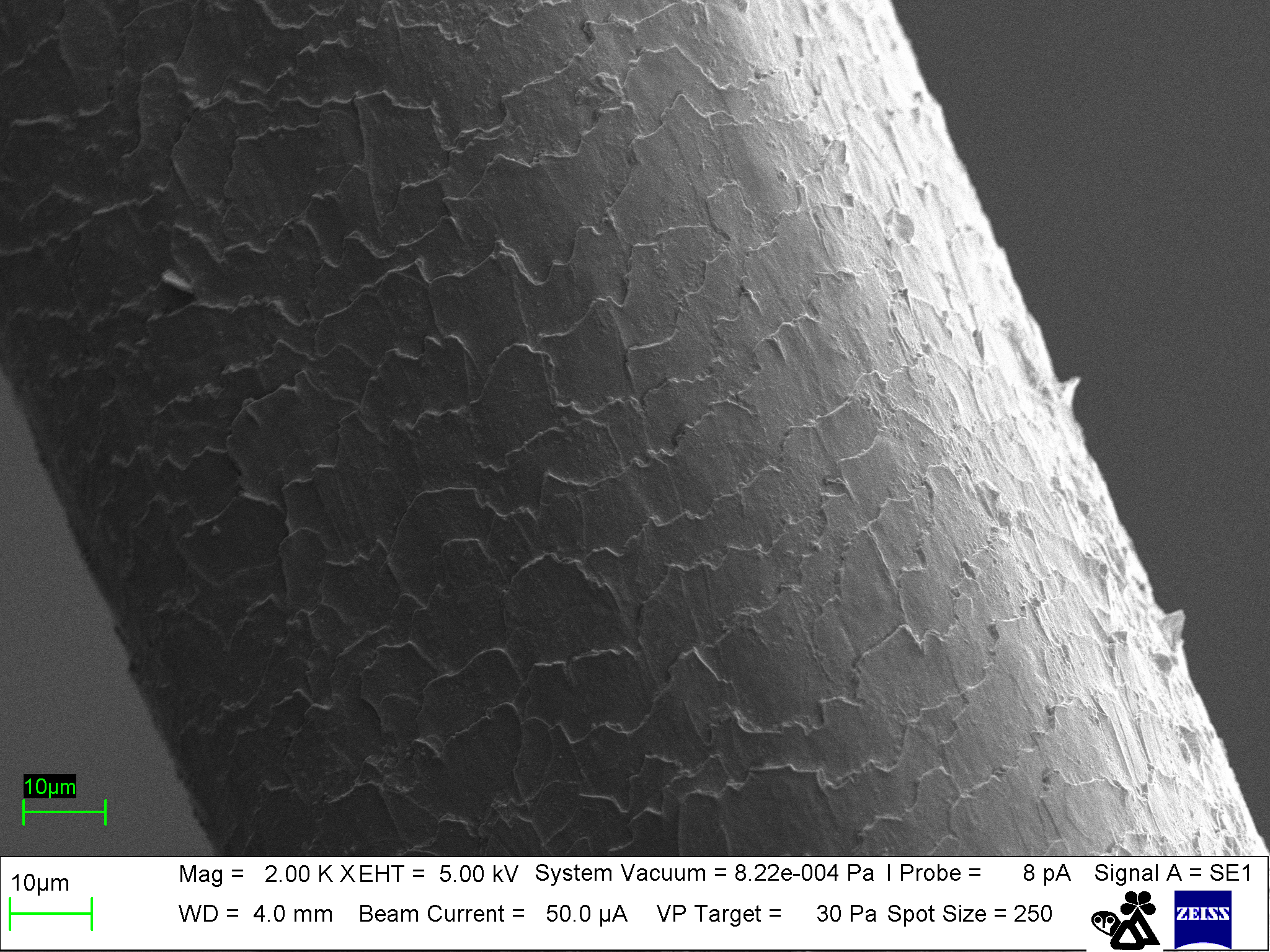
Scanning electron microscope image of a human hair

A hair's breadth, or the width of human hair, is used as an informal unit of a very short length. It connotes "a very small margin" or the narrowest degree in many contexts.

== Definitions ==
This measurement is not precise because human hair varies in diameter, ranging anywhere from 17 μm to 181 μm [millionths of a metre] One nominal value often chosen is 75 micrometres (0.0030 in), but this – like other measures based upon such highly variable natural objects, including the barleycorn – is subject to a fair degree of imprecision.

Such measures can be found in many cultures. The English "hair's breadth" has a direct analogue in the formal Burmese system of Long Measure. A "tshan khyee", the smallest unit in the system, is literally a "hair's breadth". 10 "tshan khyee" form a "hnan" (a Sesamum seed), 60 (6 hnan) form a mooyau (a species of grain), and 240 (4 mooyau) form an "atheet" (literally, a "finger's breadth").

Some formal definitions even existed in English. In several systems of English Long Measure, a "hair's breadth" has a formal definition. Samuel Maunder's Treasury of Knowledge and Library of Reference, published in 1855, states that a "hair's breadth" is one 48th of an inch (and thus one 16th of a barleycorn). John Lindley's An introduction to botany, published in 1839, and William Withering' An Arrangement of British Plants, published in 1818, states that a "hair's breadth" is one 12th of a line, which is one 144th of an inch or ~176 μm (a line itself being one 12th of an inch). Carl Linnaeus had earlier recommended, in place of Joseph Pitton de Tournefort's geometric scale for botanical measurements, a scale starting with a "hair's breadth" (capillus) which was one 12th of a line (linea), one 6th of a (finger) nail (unguis), and likewise 144th of a thumb (pollex); which itself was equal to a (Parisian) inch.

== Other body part measurements ==
Winning a competition, such as a horse race, "by a whisker" (a short beard hair) is a narrower margin of victory than winning "by a nose." An even narrower anatomically-based margin might be described in the idiom "by the skin of my teeth," which is typically applied to a narrow escape from impending disaster. This is roughly analogous to the phrase "as small as the hairs on a gnat's bollock." Some German speakers similarly use “Muggeseggele,” literally “housefly’s scrotum,” as a small unit of measurement.

== See also ==
- Beard-second
- List of humorous units of measurement
- List of unusual units of measurement
- Indefinite and fictitious numbers
