= Muggeseggele =

Idiom for a small unit of length

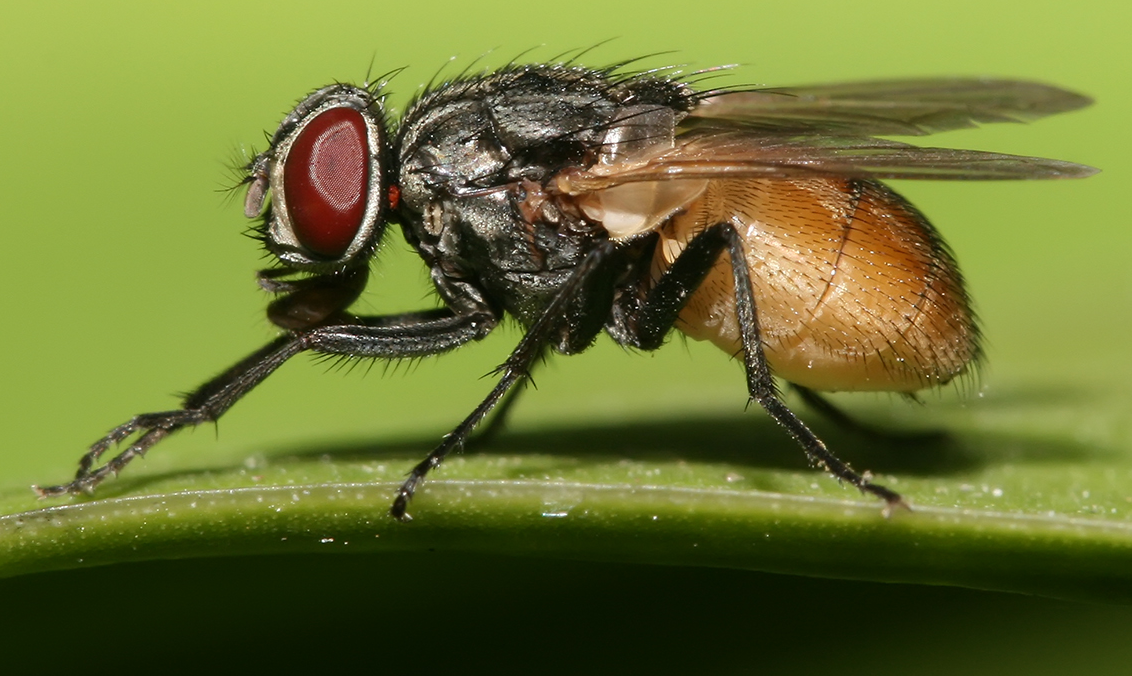
Muggeseggele refers to the sex organ of a housefly.

Muggeseggele, or Muckenseckel, is a humorous Alemannic German idiom used in Swabia to designate a nonspecific very small length or amount of something; it refers to a housefly's scrotum. It has been called the smallest Swabian unit of measurement and plays a similar role in northern Baden-Württemberg and Franconia.

The term Muggeseggele has an iconic character and is one of the most preferred Swabian idioms. In a 2009 readers' survey by Stuttgarter Nachrichten, the largest newspaper in Stuttgart, Muggeseggele was chosen as "the most beautiful Swabian word" by a large margin.

== Etymology ==
The Swabian term for housefly is Mugg. This is akin to Mücke, the standard German word for mosquito. According to linguist Hans-Martin Gauger, the second element in the word Muggeseggele corresponds to the standard German Säckel, meaning little sack; the term, therefore, must have originally referred to the scrotum, like the Latin cognate saccellus. This second element in the word occurs independently in Swabian German as Seckel, which is used as a swear word and is thus a rare instance of a sexually themed abusive word in the German language, which mostly uses scatological swearing.

In the case of Muggeseggele, the sexual and abusive aspect is not at all present. On the contrary, it is mostly used to express a very small but distinctive distance or amount of substance, as in "the soup needs a Muggeseggele of parsley". It can be used in speaking to children and is deemed completely harmless (compare Bubenspitzle). It is used in the TV series Ein Fall für B.A.R.Z., which takes place in Fellbach. German's public broadcaster SWR's children's website SWR Kindernetz (kids' network) mention the word in a Swabian dictionary that presents some peculiarities of the Swabian dialect to their young audience. Kindernetz uses the sentence A muggeseggele Zeit hätten wir noch! and translates it as Ein bisschen Zeit hätten wir noch, meaning "We still have a tiny bit of time left".

== Cultural importance and particular instances of usage ==
Wolfgang Wulz, president of the Verein Schwäbische Mundart (Association of the Swabian Tongue), has praised Muggeseggele and Lällebäbbel as prominent examples of distinctive and admirable Swabian expressions.

Both foreign and German immigrants to Baden-Württemberg tend to include some of the specific dialect expressions in the course of speaking. They often do not adapt to the dialect, but show their desire to integrate into the local community by adopting key regional vocabulary. Muggeseggele is one of the words deemed funny and distinctive and used in that way as part of a cultural code. A cookery book honoring the relationship between the twinned cities of Karlsruhe and Halle contains a small glossary of Saxon and Alemannic words, including Muggeseggele. An article in Süddeutsche Zeitung quoted Thomas Lindner, CEO of textile machinery company Groz-Beckert in Albstadt-Ebingen and Speaker of Verband Deutscher Maschinen- und Anlagenbau (VDMA) and the Chamber of Industry and Commerce in Reutlingen, as saying: "At our Indian premises, everybody knows what a muggaseggele is." Groz-Beckert is a leading company in the production of textile needles and the term Muggeseggele is therefore used to stress exactitude and diligence as well as Swabian cultural influence throughout the company.

The term is used as an example of must-know Swabian vocabulary in courses of Swabian as a foreign language in Tübingen. The same applies for lectures and books written in Swabian.

While Muggeseggele has often been used to refer simply to an extremely small measure, actual measurements of fly penises by an entomologist at the Naturkundemuseum in Stuttgart gave an average length of 0.22 millimetres (0.0087 in).

== English equivalents ==
A gnat's cock or a gnat's dick is a similar construction in the English language, but it has a more irreverent or obscene aspect. In Scots English, a "baw hair" is a similar unit of very small distance.

In Australia, the colloquial bee's dick is used. For example, “The ball missed the gentleman’s head by a mere bee’s dick”.

== See also ==
- Beard-second, a unit of length inspired by the light-year, but applicable to extremely short distances such as those in integrated circuits. It is the length an average beard grows in one second. Kemp Bennett Kolb defines the distance as exactly 100 angstroms (10 nanometres), as does Nordling and Österman's Physics Handbook.
- Hair's breadth
- Indefinite and fictitious numbers
- List of humorous units of measurement
- List of unusual units of measurement
