= Käsespätzle =

Baked cheese pasta dish

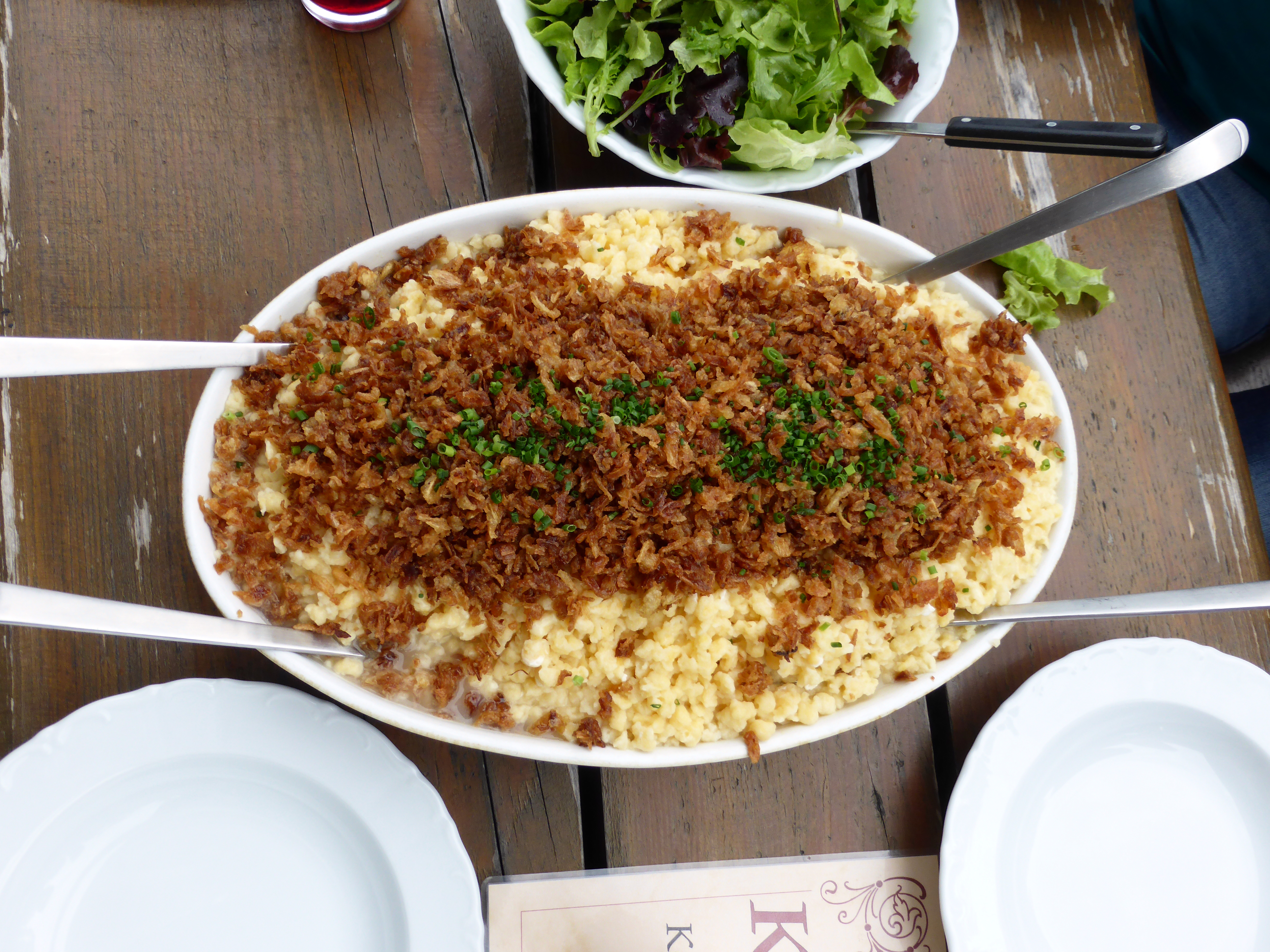
- Alternative names: Käsknöpfle; Kasspatzl
- Type: Noodles
- Place of origin: Germany
- Region or state: Swabia
- Main ingredients: Spätzle, cheese, onions

Käsespätzle (German for "spätzle with cheese", also called Käsknöpfle in Vorarlberg and Liechtenstein or Kasspatzl in Tyrol, Austria and Bavaria) is a traditional dish of the German regions of Swabia, Baden and Allgäu, and also in the Austrian regions Vorarlberg and Tyrol, as well as Liechtenstein and Switzerland.

== Preparation ==
Hot spätzle and grated cheese such as Emmentaler or Bergkäse are glazed alternately and finally topped with fried onions. After adding each layer, the käsespätzle is baked until all the cheese is melted.

Accompanying side dishes are green salads or potato salad. In some parts of Vorarlberg and also Liechtenstein käsespätzle is usually served with apple sauce.

== Regional specialities ==
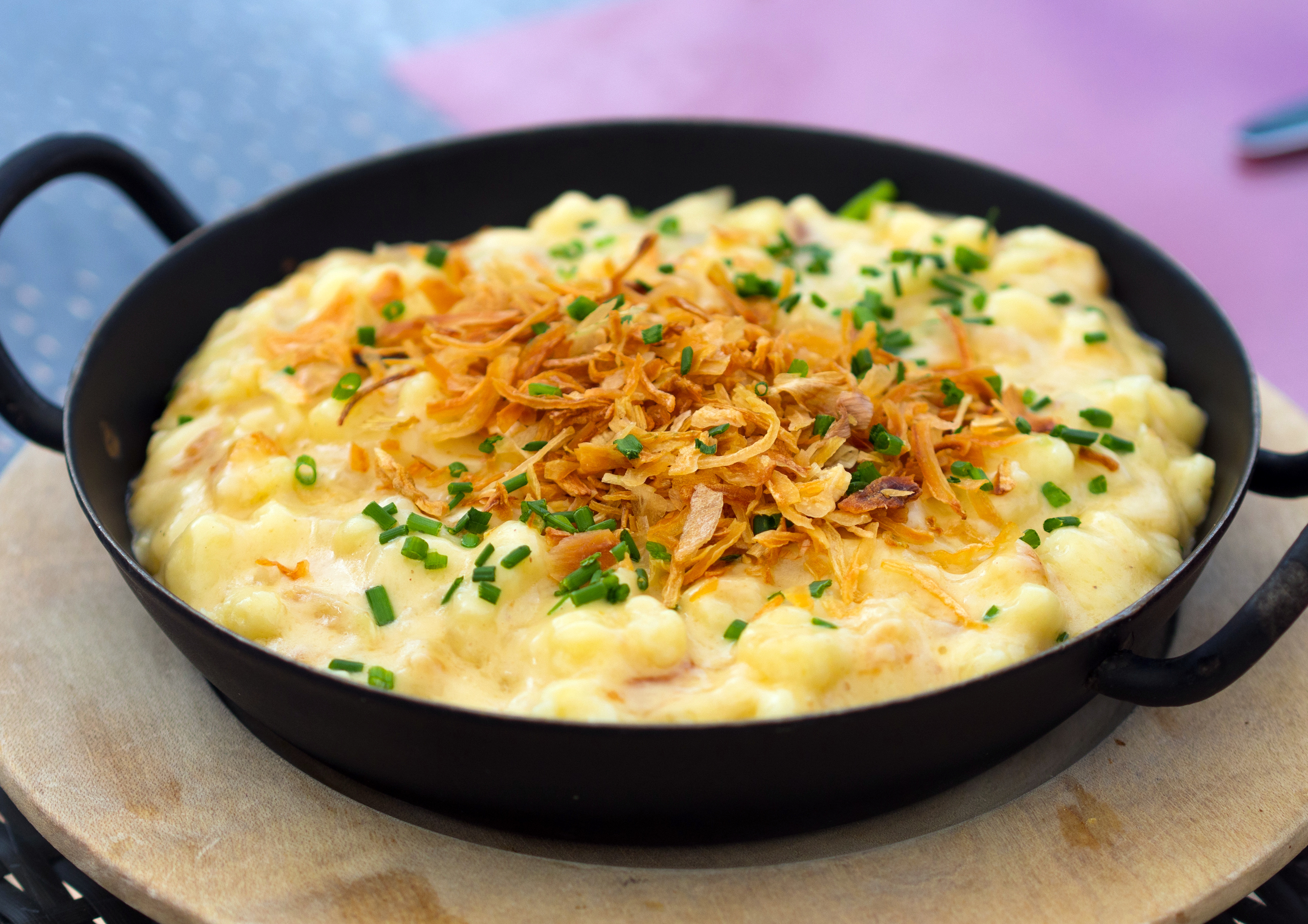
Käsespätzle in a pan with roasted onions and chives as topping

In Tyrol, käsespätzle are prepared with Bergkäse or Emmental cheese, optionally with both. In Vorarlberg two different cheese varieties are dominating, so in Montafon the cooks use Montafon sour cheese and in Bregenz Forest they use Bergkäse and Räßkäse, a local hard cheese.

Side dishes in Vorarlberg are butter and yellowed tarnished onion rings.

Different variations are found with Limburger, Weisslacker or Vorarlberger Bergkäse.

== Variations ==
A variation of käsespätzle is Kasnocken or Kasnockn from Salzburg and Upper Styria, both parts of Austria and are pan-fried instead. Grated cheese and spätzle, freshly scraped from a board, are mixed together and are heated in a pan.

== See also ==
- List of cheese dishes
