= New York Minute =

A New York minute is a very short period of time.

New York Minute may also refer to:

- New York Minute (film), a 2004 American family comedy film starring Mary-Kate and Ashley Olsen
- "New York Minute" (Law & Order), a 2005 episode of the TV series Law & Order
- "New York Minute" (song), by Don Henley, 1989, and several cover versions of it
- In a New York Minute, a 1999 album by Ian Shaw
- "In a New York Minute" (song), by Ronnie McDowell, 1985

== See also ==
- New York second
