= Mohnnudel =

Potato dish

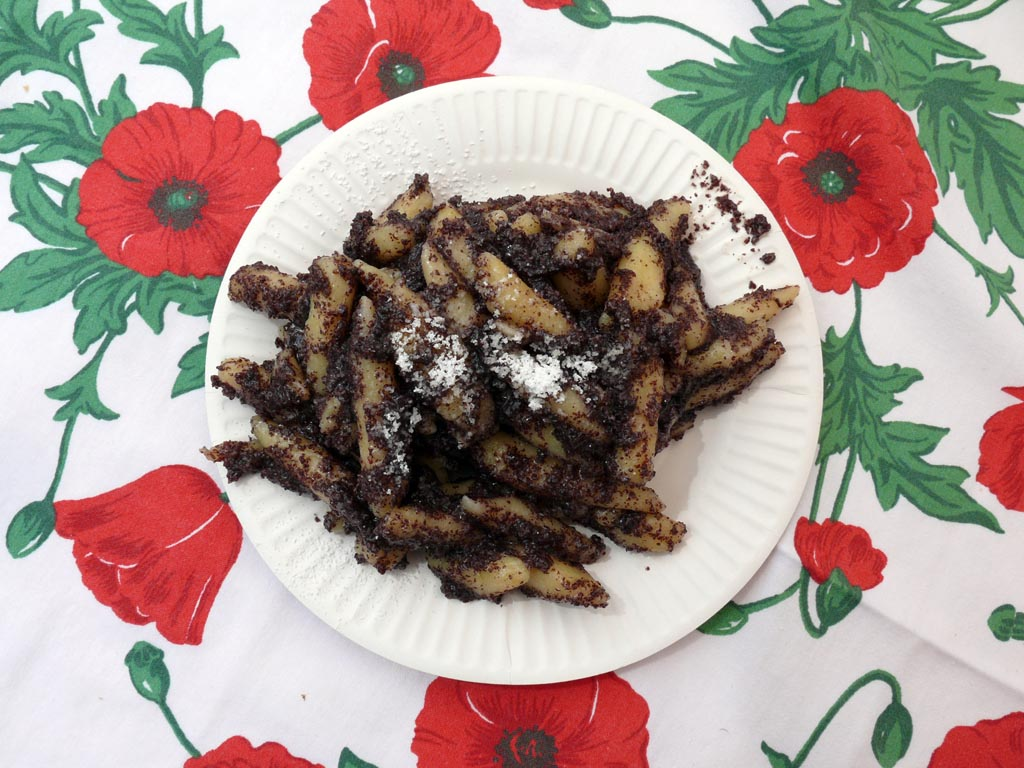
- Type: Dumpling
- Place of origin: Austria
- Region or state: Waldviertel

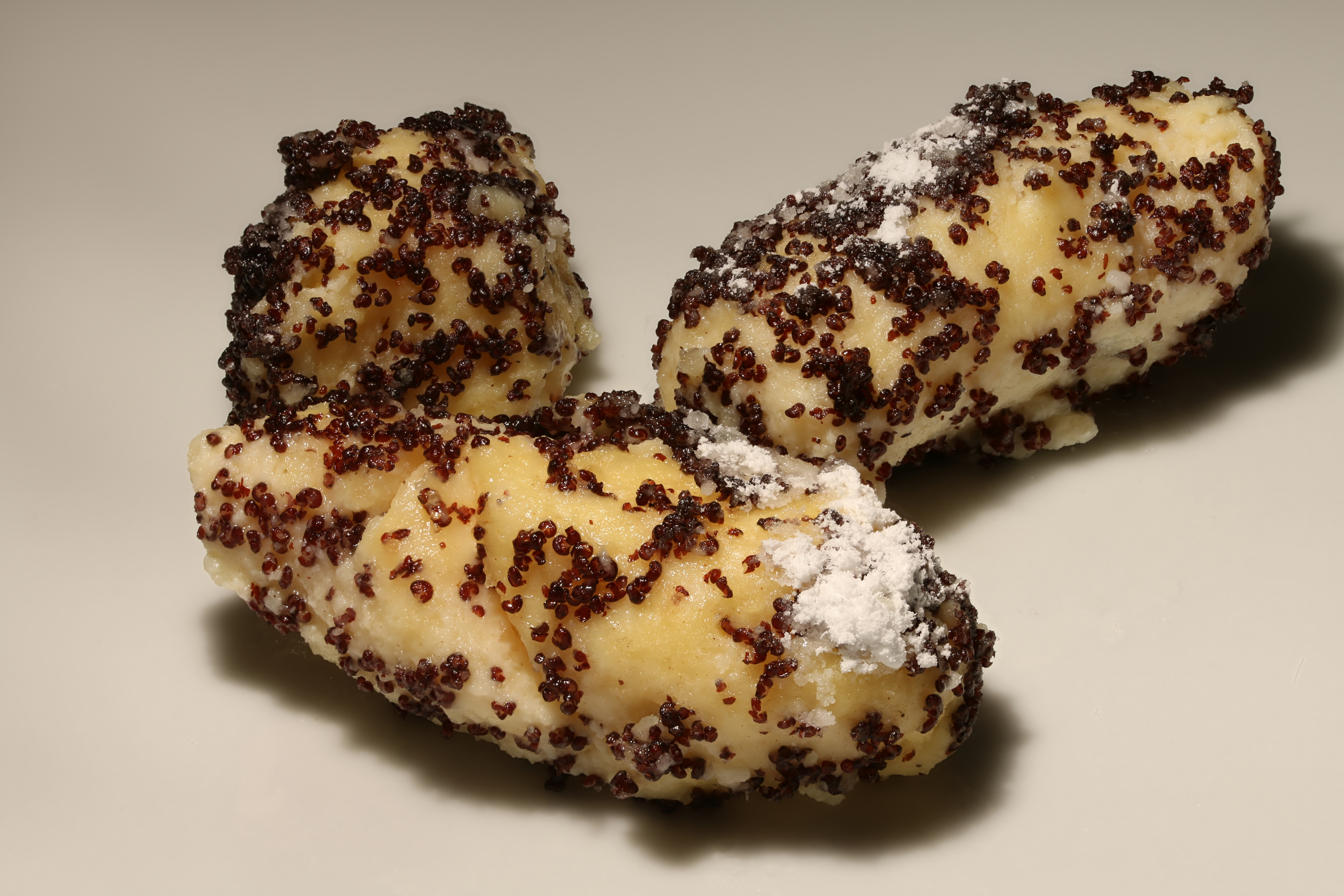
Mohnnudeln in detail

Mohnnudeln (German: [ˈmoːnnuːdl̩n], meaning poppy seed noodles), is the name of thick noodles of a potato dough in Bohemian, Slovak and Austrian cuisine, similar to the Schupfnudel. The main difference is that Mohnnudeln are served with melted butter and ground poppy seeds, and are sprinkled with confectioner's sugar.

They are also called Waldviertler Mohnnudeln, referring to the Austrian area where they originated. Waldviertel is a part of Lower Austria, where poppy seeds, which give the dish its distinct black coloring, have been cultivated for ages.

Mohnnudeln can be eaten as a dessert or a light supper. Most Bavarians and Austrians serve it traditionally as a main course.
