= Schäufele =

German pork dish

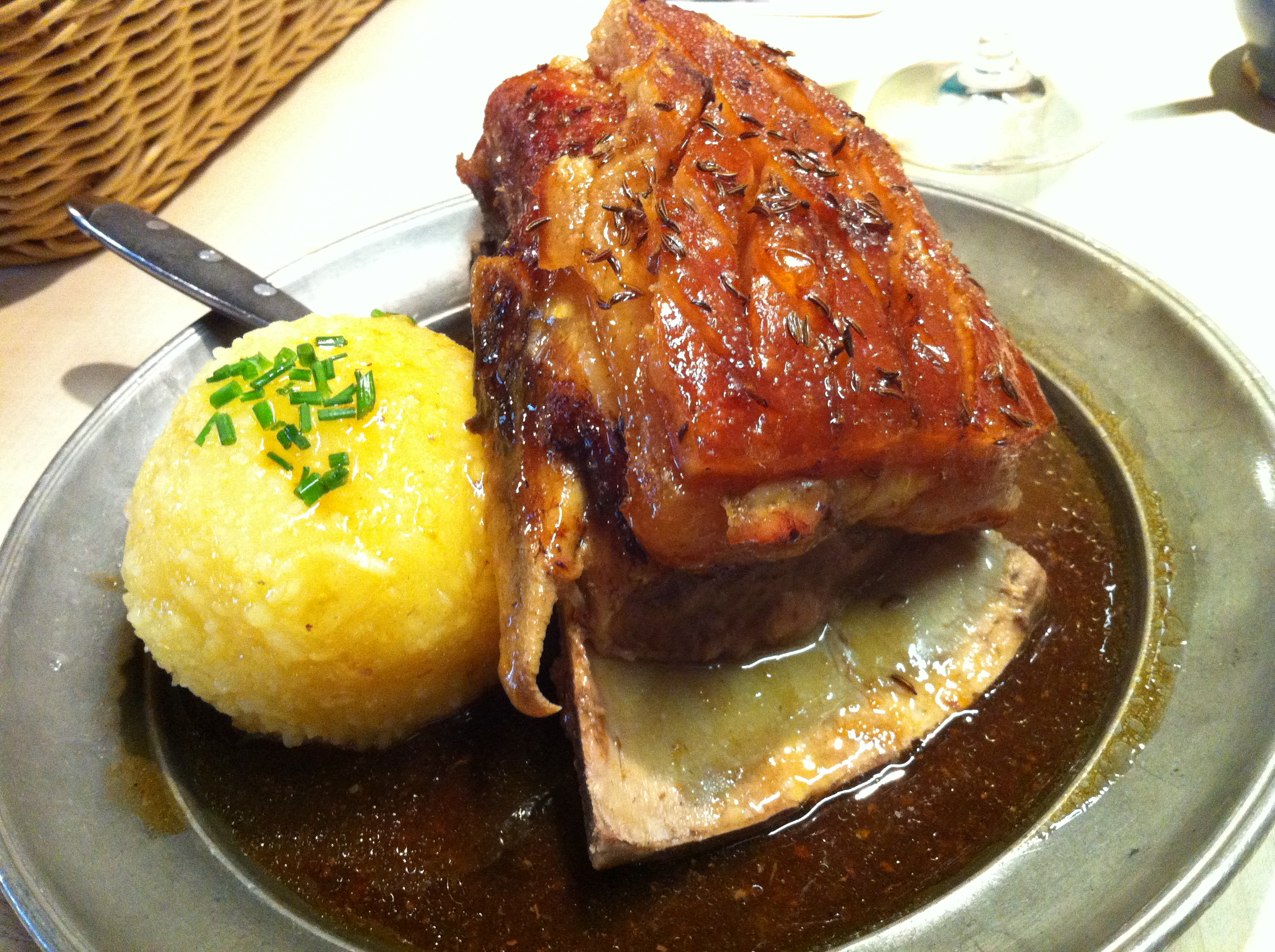
"Schäufele" from Franconia

Schäufele (pronounced [ˈʃɔʏ̯fələ] also "Schäuferle", "Schüfeli", "Schäuferla" or "Schäufelchen") is a traditional dish from Franconia in the south of Germany. It is made from the pig's shoulder meat, which gives the dish its name, "Schäufele", or the pig's scapula.

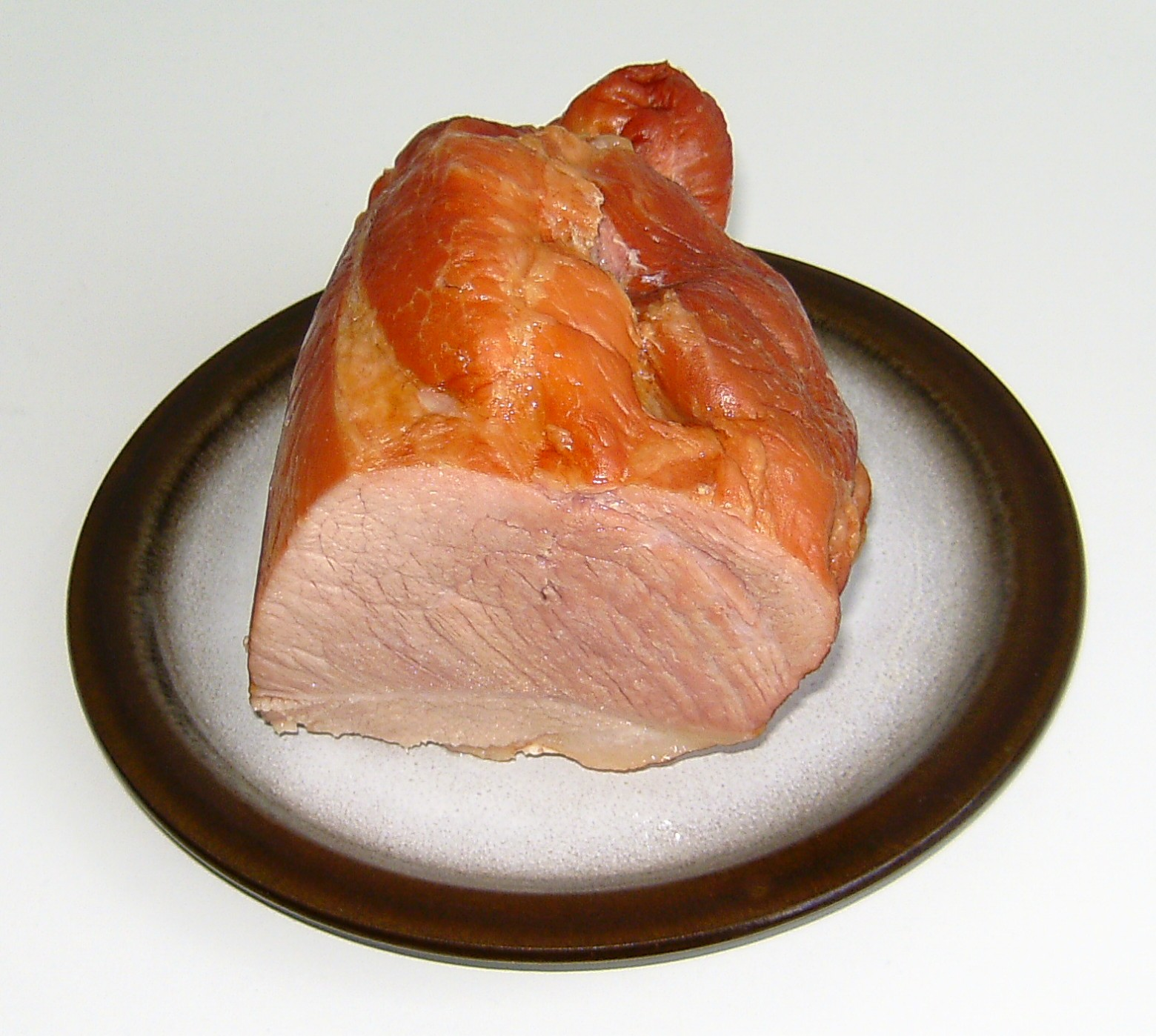
"Schäufele" from Baden

== Recipe ==
In Franconia, the meat, the pork rind and the bone are roasted together as a whole. Before that, the pork rind is scratched in a criss-cross pattern, seasoned with salt, pepper and caraway and put in a casserole dish with diced root vegetables and onions where it is doused with beer and roasted in the oven for about two or three hours. The roast is ready as soon as the meat is easy to separate from the bone and the pork rind is crispy and golden brown. It is then served with various side dishes including gravy, Kartoffelklöße, salad, sauerkraut, red cabbage and savoy cabbage.

In Baden, the meat is cured and smoked before it is simmered in a broth of water, white wine, vinegar, onion, bay laurel and clove for about two to two and a half hours. It is then served with potato salad, dressed with a broth of salt, pepper and vinegar. Although available all year around, Schäufele with potato salad is the typical Christmas Eve supper in the southern half of Baden.

In Switzerland, it is also cured and smoked but served with beans or sauerkraut. Therefore, it is a very common Christmas dish.

== See also ==
- List of smoked foods
- Ham
