= List of humorous units of measurement =

Unconventional units of measurement intended as humor

Many people have made use of, or invented, units of measurement intended primarily for their humor value. The units listed here were invented by sources that are notable for reasons other than having made the unit itself, and are widely known in the Anglophone world for their humor value.

== Systems ==
=== FFF units ===
Unit	Dimension	Definition	SI Value
furlong	length	660 ft	201.168 m
firkin (Note: The firkin is normally a unit of volume equal to nine imperial gallons (41 L). The "firkin" of the FFF system is the firkin of water, i.e. the mass of nine imperial gallons of water. The imperial gallon was originally based on the volume of ten pounds (4.5 kg) of water (under certain thermodynamic conditions). This gives us a water density of ten pounds per imperial gallon (1 kg/L). Using this as a basis of our calculation we obtain ninety pounds (41 kg) for the firkin of water.)	mass	90 lb	40.8233 kg
fortnight	time	14 days	1,209,600 s

Most countries use the International System of Units (SI). In contrast, the furlong/firkin/fortnight system of units of measurement draws attention by being extremely old fashioned and off-beat at the same time.

One furlong per fortnight is very nearly 1 centimetre per minute (to within 1 part in 400). Besides having the meaning of "any obscure unit", furlongs per fortnight have also served frequently in the classroom as an example on how to reduce a unit's fraction. The speed of light may be expressed as being roughly 1.8 terafurlongs per fortnight (or megafurlongs per microfortnight).

=== Potrzebie ===
In issue 33, Mad published a partial table of the "Potrzebie System of Weights and Measures" developed by 19-year-old Donald E. Knuth, later a famed computer scientist. According to Knuth, the basis of this new revolutionary system is the potrzebie, which equals the thickness of Mad issue 26, or 2.2633484517438173216473 mm.

Volume was measured in ngogn (equal to 1000 cubic potrzebies), mass in blintz (equal to the mass of 1 ngogn of halva, which is "a form of pie [with] a specific gravity of 3.1416 and a specific heat of .31416"), and time in seven named units (decimal powers of the average Earth rotation, equal to 1 "clarke"). The system also features such units as whatmeworry (power), cowznofski (time), vreeble (heat energy), hoo, and hah (work).

According to the "Date" system in Knuth's article, which substitutes a 10-clarke "mingo" for a month and a 100-clarke "cowznofski", for a year, the date of October 29, 2007, is rendered as "Cal 7, 201 C. M." (for Cowznofsko Madi, or "in the Cowznofski of our MAD"). The dates are calculated from October 1, 1952, the date MAD was first published. Dates before this point are referred to as "B.M." ("Before MAD.") The ten "Mingoes" are: Tales (Tal.) Calculated (Cal.) To (To) Drive (Dri.) You (You) Humor (Hum.) In (In) A (A) Jugular (Jug.) Vein (Vei.)

=== Great Underground Empire (Zork) ===
In the Zork series of games, the Great Underground Empire has its own system of measurements, the most frequently referenced of which is the bloit. Defined as the distance the king's favorite pet can run in one hour (spoofing a popular legend about the history of the foot), the length of the bloit varies dramatically, but the one canonical conversion to real-world units puts it at approximately two-thirds of a mile (1 km). (Note: Dimwit Flathead defoliated the Fublio Valley to make a huge statue of himself. The literature for Zork describes the area defoliated as 400,000 acres (which equals 625 square miles), whereas that for Zork Zero gives the area as 1,400 square bloits. This would define the bloit as 0.668 miles, 3,527.8 feet, or 1.075 km.) Liquid volume is measured in gloops, and temperature in degrees Q (57 °Q is said to be the freezing point of water).

== Quantity ==
=== Sagan ===
As a humorous tribute to Carl Sagan and his association with the catchphrase "billions and billions", a sagan has been defined as a large quantity – technically at least four billion (two billion plus two billion) – of anything.

== Length ==
=== Attoparsec ===
Parsecs are used in astronomy to measure interstellar distances. A parsec is approximately 3.26 light-years or about 3.086×10^{16} m (1.917×10^{13} mi). Combining it with the "atto-" prefix (×10^{−18}) yields attoparsec (apc), a conveniently human-scaled unit of about 3.086 centimetres (1.215 in) that is used only humorously.

=== Beard-second ===
The beard-second is a unit of length inspired by the light-year, but applicable to extremely short distances such as those in integrated circuits. It is the length an average beard grows in one second. Kemp Bennett Kolb defines the distance as exactly 100 angstroms (10 nanometres), as does Nordling and Österman's Physics Handbook. Google Calculator uses 5 nm.

=== Bee's dick ===
An Australian term for a very small distance, as in "he missed crashing into the truck by a bee's dick". It is derived from the small size of a male bee's penis.

=== Jimmy Griffin Snow Index ===
Television station WKBW-TV in Buffalo, New York developed the "Jimmy Griffin Snow Index" to measure the potential severity of a snowstorm. It is named after former Buffalo mayor James D. Griffin, who in 1985 earned the nickname "Six Pack Jimmy" after suggesting residents grab a six-pack of Genesee beer to wait out an upcoming snowstorm. The index is measured in cans of beer, with roughly one can for every 4 inches (10 cm) of expected snowfall (the index is not perfectly linear at its lower levels as originally introduced); thus, Griffin's six-pack would be recommended for a storm bringing two feet of snow.

=== Mickey ===
One mickey is the smallest resolvable unit of distance by a given computer mouse pointing device. It is named after Walt Disney's Mickey Mouse cartoon character. Mouse motion is reported in horizontal and vertical mickeys. Device sensitivity is usually specified in mickeys per inch. Typical resolution is 500 mickeys per inch (16 mickeys per mm), but resolutions up to 16,000 mickeys per inch (600 mickeys per mm) are available.

Unrelated, a mickey is Canadian slang for a 375 mililitre bottle of spirits.

=== Muggeseggele ===
A Muggeseggele is a humorous Alemannic German idiom used in Swabia to designate a nonspecific very small length or amount of something; it refers to a housefly's scrotum.

=== Sheppey ===
A measure of distance equal to about 7/8 of a mile (1.4 km), defined as the closest distance at which sheep remain picturesque. The Sheppey is the creation of Douglas Adams and John Lloyd, included in The Meaning of Liff, their dictionary of putative meanings for words that are actually just place names. It is named after the Isle of Sheppey in the UK.

=== Smoot ===
The smoot is a unit of length, defined as the height in 1958 of Oliver R. Smoot, who later became the chairman of the American National Standards Institute (ANSI), and then the president of the International Organization for Standardization (ISO). The unit is used to measure the length of the Harvard Bridge. Canonically, and originally, in 1958 when Smoot was a Lambda Chi Alpha pledge at MIT (class of 1962), the bridge was measured to be 364.4 smoots, plus or minus one ear, using Mr. Smoot himself as a ruler. At the time, Smoot was 5 feet, 7 inches, or 170 cm, tall. Google Earth and Google Calculator include the smoot as a unit of measurement.

The Cambridge (Massachusetts) police department adopted the convention of using smoots to measure the locations of accidents and incidents on the bridge. When the original markings were removed or covered over during bridge maintenance, the police had to request that someone reapply the smoot scale markings. During a major bridge rebuild, the concrete sidewalk was permanently divided into segments one smoot in length, as opposed to the regular division of six feet.

=== Wiffle ===
A wiffle, also referred to as a WAM for Wiffle (ball) assisted measurement, is equal to a sphere 89 millimetres (3.5 inches) in diameter – the size of a Wiffle ball, a perforated, lightweight plastic ball frequently used by marine biologists as a size reference in photos to measure corals and other objects. The spherical shape makes it omnidirectional and perfect for taking a speedy measurement, and the open design also allows it to avoid being crushed by water pressure. Wiffle balls are a much cheaper alternative to using two reference lasers, which often pass straight through gaps in thin corals.

A scientist on the research vessel EV Nautilus is credited with pioneering the technique.

== Area ==
=== Barn, outhouse, shed ===
A barn is a serious metric unit of area used by nuclear physicists to quantify the scattering or absorption cross-section of very small particles, such as atomic nuclei. One barn is equal to 1.0×10^{−28} m^{2}. The name derives from the folk expressions "As big as a barn," and "Couldn't hit the broad side of a barn", used by particle accelerator physicists to refer to the probability of achieving a collision between particles. For nuclear purposes, 1.0×10^{−28} m^{2} is actually rather large. The outhouse (1.0×10^{−6} barns) and shed (1.0×10^{−24} barns) are derived by analogy.

=== Nanoacre ===
The nanoacre is a unit of real estate on a very-large-scale integration (VLSI) chip equal to 0.00627264 sq in (4.0468564224 mm^{2}) or the area of a square of side length 0.0792 in (2.01168 mm). VLSI nanoacres have similar total costs to acres in Silicon Valley.

== Volume ==
=== Barn-megaparsec ===
This unit is similar in concept to the attoparsec, combining very large and small scales. When a barn (a very small unit of area used for measuring the cross sectional area of atomic nuclei) is multiplied by a megaparsec (a very large unit of length used for measuring the distances between galaxies), the result is a human-scaled unit of volume approximately equal to 2/3 of a teaspoon (about 3 mL).

=== Bruno ===
A Bruno is the volume of the dent left in asphalt pavement after a piano is dropped six stories from the roof of MIT's Baker House. It is named after Charlie Bruno, class of 1974, who discovered that the student handbook at the time did not prohibit dropping objects off of the roof, but only prohibited throwing objects out of dorm windows. The Bruno is measured periodically on MIT's Drop Day, and is approximately one liter.

=== Hubble-barn ===
Similar to the barn-megaparsec, the Hubble-barn uses the barn with the Hubble length, which is the radius of the visible universe as derived by using the Hubble constant and the speed of light. This amounts to around 13.1 litres (3.46 US gallons, 2.88 Imperial gallons).

== Power ==
=== Donkey power ===
This facetious engineering unit is defined as 250 watts – about a third of a horsepower.

=== Pirate-ninja ===
A pirate-ninja is defined as one kilowatt-hour (3.6 MJ) per Martian day, or sol. It is equivalent to approximately 40.55 watts, and was first used in the 2011 novel The Martian by Andy Weir. Weir said in a 2015 interview that the Curiosity rover team at the Jet Propulsion Laboratory uses the similar unit 'watt-hours per sol' in their meetings, and the team told Weir that they should just call them milli-pirate-ninjas.

== Time ==
=== Friedman ===
The Friedman is approximately six months, specifically six months in the future, and named after columnist Thomas Friedman who repeatedly used the span in reference to when a determination of Iraq's future could be surmised.

=== Jiffy ===
A jiffy is a unit of time used in computer operating systems, being the interval of time between system timer interrupts. This interval varies from system to system, but is typically between 1 and 10 milliseconds.

=== Microcentury ===
According to Gian-Carlo Rota, the mathematician John von Neumann used the term microcentury to denote the maximum length of a lecture. One microcentury is 52 minutes and 35.7 seconds – one millionth of a century.

=== Nanocentury ===
A unit sometimes used in computing, the term is believed to have been coined by IBM in 1969 from the design objective "never to let the user wait more than a few nanocenturies for a response". A nanocentury is one-billionth of a century or approximately 3.156 seconds. Tom Duff is cited as saying that, to within half a percent, a nanocentury is π seconds.

=== New York second ===
The New York second ("the shortest unit of time in the multiverse") is defined in Terry Pratchett's novel Lords and Ladies as the period of time between the traffic lights turning green and the cab behind one honking. The idiomatic expression "in a New York minute", used in various contexts to mean an instant or a very short time, is of similar origin, referring to the busyness of New York and impatience of its residents.

=== Ohnosecond ===
An "ohnosecond" is the second after one makes a terrible mistake, such as deleting the wrong file or sending a text message to the wrong person, where the person in question can do nothing but say "oh no". The term is believed to originate from Elizabeth Powell Crowe's 1993 novel, The Electronic Traveler.

=== Scaramucci ===
A Scaramucci (or Mooch) is a unit of tenure, 11 (or sometimes 10) days, referencing the length of Anthony Scaramucci's brief term as White House Communications Director during the first presidency of Donald Trump.

=== Shake ===
In nuclear physics, a shake is 10 nanoseconds, the approximate time for a generation within a nuclear chain reaction. The term comes from the idiom "two shakes of a lamb's tail", meaning quickly.

=== Tatum ===
A tatum is the "lowest regular pulse train that a listener intuitively infers from the timing of perceived musical events". It is named after the jazz pianist Art Tatum, who was notable for his high-speed playing.

== Radioactivity ==
=== Banana equivalent dose ===
Banana equivalent dose, the amount of radiation exposure gained from eating an average banana. A single BED is considered to be negligibly small, posing no health risk.

== Non-conventional ==
These units describe dimensions which are not and cannot be covered by the International System of Units.

=== Blatt (odor) ===
In Steven Levy's book Hackers: Heroes of the Computer Revolution, Levy mentions how Richard Greenblatt prioritized his work over bathing, leading to a strong stench. Therefore, Greenblatt's coworkers conceived of the blatt as a joke, though the milliblatt was used more, as the blatt was so powerful it was "just about inconceivable".

=== Canard (quackery) ===
The canard is a unit of quackery created by Andy Lewis in the need for a fractional index measuring pseudoscience. It is proposed as an SI unit to replace the old "Crackpot Index" that was presented in 1998.

Quack words include 'energy', 'holistic', 'vibrations', 'magnetic healing', 'quantum'. These words are usually borrowed from physics and used to promote dubious health claims.

The scale is from 0 to 10, with 0 being 'no quackery' and 10 being 'complete quackery'.

=== Dirac (information flow) ===
Physicist Paul Dirac was known among his colleagues for his precise yet taciturn nature. His colleagues in Cambridge jokingly defined a unit of a dirac which was one word per hour.

=== Garn (nausea) ===
The Garn is a unit used by NASA to measure nausea and travel sickness caused by space adaptation syndrome. It is named after astronaut Jake Garn, who was frequently sick during tests and on orbit. A score of one Garn means the sufferer is completely incapacitated.

=== Hawking Index (reading capacity) ===
Invented by mathematician Jordan Ellenberg, the Hawking Index (HI) is the percentage of a book's readers who will finish it. Books with a lower HI are less likely to be completed. It is named after Stephen Hawking, whose book A Brief History of Time scores 6.6% on the scale.

=== Helen (beauty) ===
Helen of Troy (from the Iliad) is widely known as "the face that launched a thousand ships". Thus, 1 millihelen is the amount of beauty needed to launch a single ship. Other derived units such as the negative helen (the power to beach ships) have also been described.

=== Lenat (bogosity) ===
The unit of bogosity, i.e. how bogus a person, claim, or proceeding is, derived from the fictional field of quantum bogodynamics, is the Lenat, named after Douglas Lenat, a computer scientist and professor who failed one of his students on an exam because they answered "AI is bogus" on all of the questions. The Lenat itself is seldom used, as it is understood to be too large for normal conversation; its most common form is the microLenat.

=== MegaFonzie (coolness) ===
A MegaFonzie is a fictional unit of measurement of an object's coolness invented by Professor Farnsworth in the 2003 Futurama episode "Bender Should Not Be Allowed on TV". A 'Fonzie' is about the amount of coolness inherent in the Happy Days character Fonzie.

=== Pouter (obstruction) ===
During World War II, scientists working for the British Department of Miscellaneous Weapons Development encountered a particularly obstructive Royal Navy officer called Commander Pouter, for whom the unit of Obstruction was named, due to his implacable opposition to any work being carried out in the field for which he was personally responsible.

Subsequently, the micropouter was used, as it was hoped that no individual of a similarly difficult disposition would be encountered, and the pouter was too large a unit for everyday use.

=== Rictus scale (media coverage of earthquakes) ===
Tom Weller suggests the Rictus scale for earthquake intensity (a takeoff of the conventional Richter scale), measuring media coverage of the event.

Rictus scale #	Richter scale equivalent	Media coverage
1	0–3	Small articles in local papers
2	3–5	Lead story on local news; mentioned on network news
3	5–6.5	Lead story on network news; wire-service photos appear in newspapers nationally; governor visits scene
4	6.5–7.5	Network correspondents sent to scene; president visits area; commemorative T-shirts appear
5	7.5+	Covers of weekly news magazines; network specials; "instant books" appear

=== Shortz (fame) ===
This is a unit of fame, hype, or infamy, named for the American puzzle creator and editor, Will Shortz. The measure is the number of times one's name has appeared in The New York Times crossword puzzle as either a clue or solution. Arguably, this number should only be calculated for the Shortz era (1993–present). Shortz himself is 1 Shortz famous.

=== Springfield (county fairs) ===
Invented by San Francisco Chronicle culture critic Peter Hartlaub, this rates county fairs by the quality of their musical acts. Fairs are rated a scale of one to four Springfields, "in honor of Rick Springfield, arguably the greatest county fair free act in history."

=== Standardized Giraffe Unit (animal size) ===
Animal	SGUs
Corgi	0.05
Canada Goose	0.14
Duck	0.2
Penguin	0.2
Half a giraffe	0.5
Peacock	0.55
Elephant	1.25

The standardized giraffe unit (SGU) is proposed by the European Space Agency's Near-Earth Object Coordination Centre as a standardized unit for animal size reference. The agency defines the SGU in terms of other animals as shown in the adjoining table.

=== Thaum (magic) ===
In the Discworld series of comic fantasy novels by Terry Pratchett, the thaum is a basic unit of magical strength, defined as the amount of magic needed to create one small white pigeon or three normal sized billiard balls.

=== Warhol (fame) ===
This is a unit of fame or hype, derived from the dictum attributed to Andy Warhol that "everyone will be world-famous for fifteen minutes". It represents fifteen minutes of fame. Some multiples are:

- 1 kilowarhol – famous for 15,000 minutes, or 10.42 days. A sort of metric "nine-day wonder".
- 1 megawarhol – famous for 15 million minutes, or 28.5 years. The use of this would be antithetical to the original unit's purpose.

First used by Cullen Murphy in 1997.

=== Wheaton (influence) ===
The Wheaton is a measurement of Twitter followers relative to celebrity Wil Wheaton, equal to 500,000 followers. The unit was invented by John Kovalic in the May 21, 2009, edition of his webcomic Dork Tower. The comic includes references to units named for other celebrities, such as Neil Gaiman, John Hodgman, Jonathan Coulton, and Felicia Day.

=== Minutes per Big Mac (economic) ===
Minutes per Big Mac (alternatively, minimum wage minutes per Big Mac) refers to how many minutes one has to work in a country or region at average wage (or, correspondingly, at minimum wage) to afford one Big Mac, a hamburger sold by McDonald's, in that country or region.

=== Waffle House Index (disaster response) ===
The Waffle House Index is an informal metric used by FEMA to gauge the severity of an incoming storm in the United States. Because Waffle House is known for staying open 24 hours, 365 days a year, the closure of a Waffle House is a helpful tool to measure the severity of an approaching storm.

== See also ==
- History of measurement
- Indefinite and fictitious numbers
- List of non-coherent units of measurement
- List of obsolete units of measurement
- Outline of metrology and measurement
- Systems of measurement
