= Weisslacker =

German semi-soft cheese

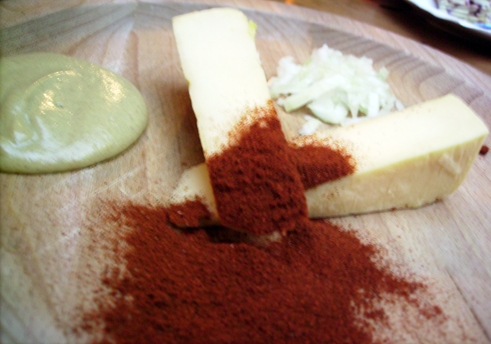
- Other names: Beer cheese, Beer kaese, Bierkäse, Bierkaese,
- Country of origin: Germany
- Source of milk: Cow
- Pasteurised: Yes
- Texture: Semi-soft
- Aging time: 7 months

Weisslacker (or Weißlacker, pronounced [ˈvaɪsˌlakɐ]; German for 'whitewashed', due to the rind color), also known as bierkäse and beer cheese, is a type of cow's milk cheese that originated in Germany, but is also produced in the United States, mostly in Wisconsin. It is a pungent and salted surface-ripened cheese that starts out much like brick cheese. It ripens for seven months in highly humid conditions and is related to Limburger cheese, and has a similarly powerful smell, but paradoxically mild taste.

Connoisseurs of this delicacy often take it with beer (sometimes dipping the cheese directly in their drinks), hence the name. Many find it too overpowering to serve with wine. This cheese is also served on small slices of rye or pumpernickel bread often with some sliced onion. It is a common item on pub and restaurant menus in the Czech Republic, the country with the highest per-capita beer consumption in the world. This cheese is a common ingredient in various breads, soups, and dips.

In the EU as of 2015, Weißlacker and Allgäuer Weißlacker are protected with a protected designation of origin indication.
