= Passatelli =

Typical pasta from Romagna

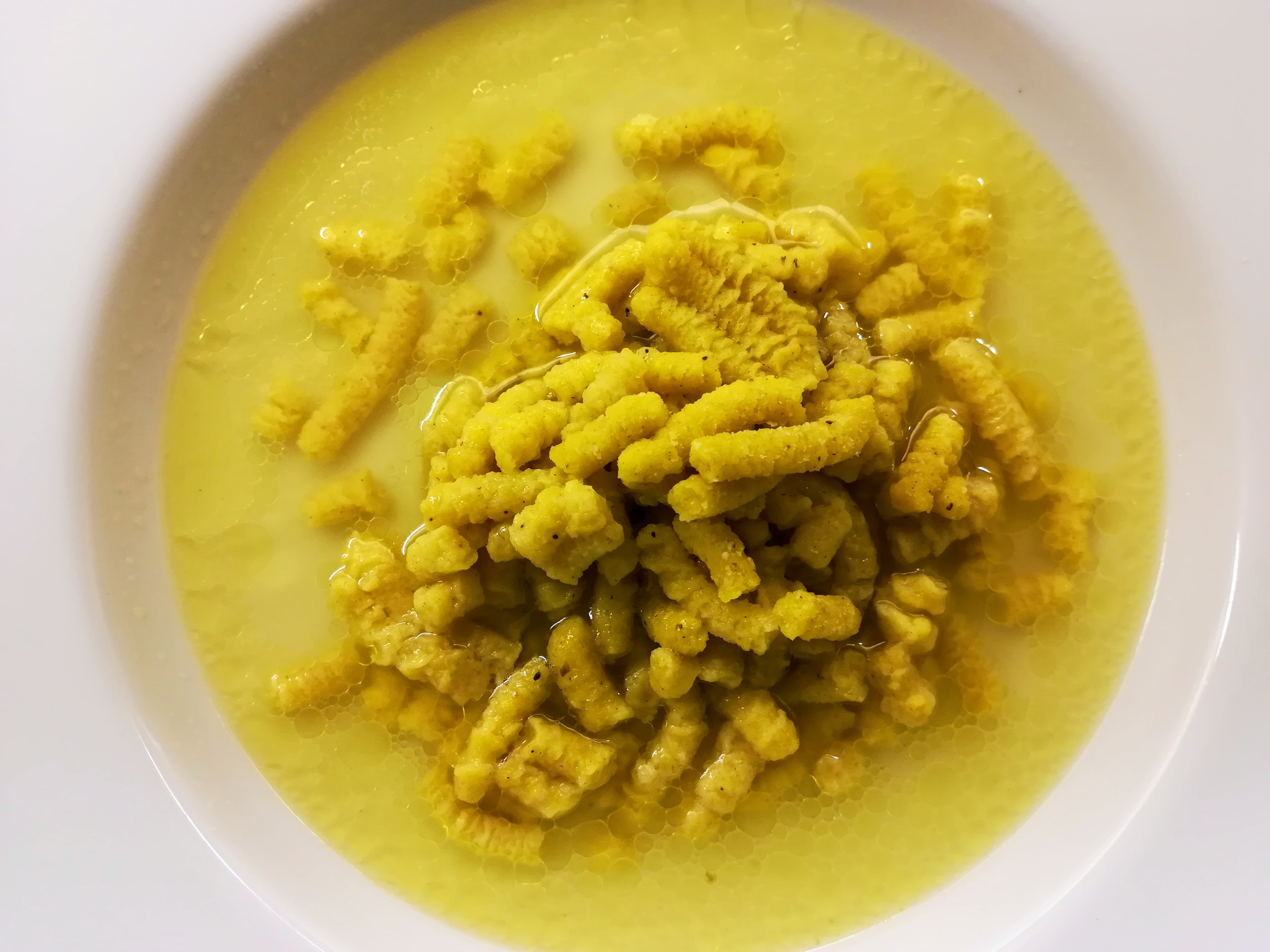
- Passatelli in brodo
- Type: Pasta
- Place of origin: Italy
- Region or state: Romagna
- Main ingredients: Bread crumbs, eggs, Parmesan, lemon, nutmeg

Passatelli are a pasta formed of bread crumbs, eggs, grated Parmesan cheese, and in some regions lemon, and nutmeg; it is typically cooked in chicken broth. Typically, it is found mainly in Romagna, Pesaro and Urbino province (northern Marche), Ancona province (central Marche) and other regions of Italy, such as Umbria.

Passatelli is made by passing the dough through a potato ricer, often into a boiling broth.

== See also ==
- List of pasta
