= Schupfnudel =

Central European dumpling

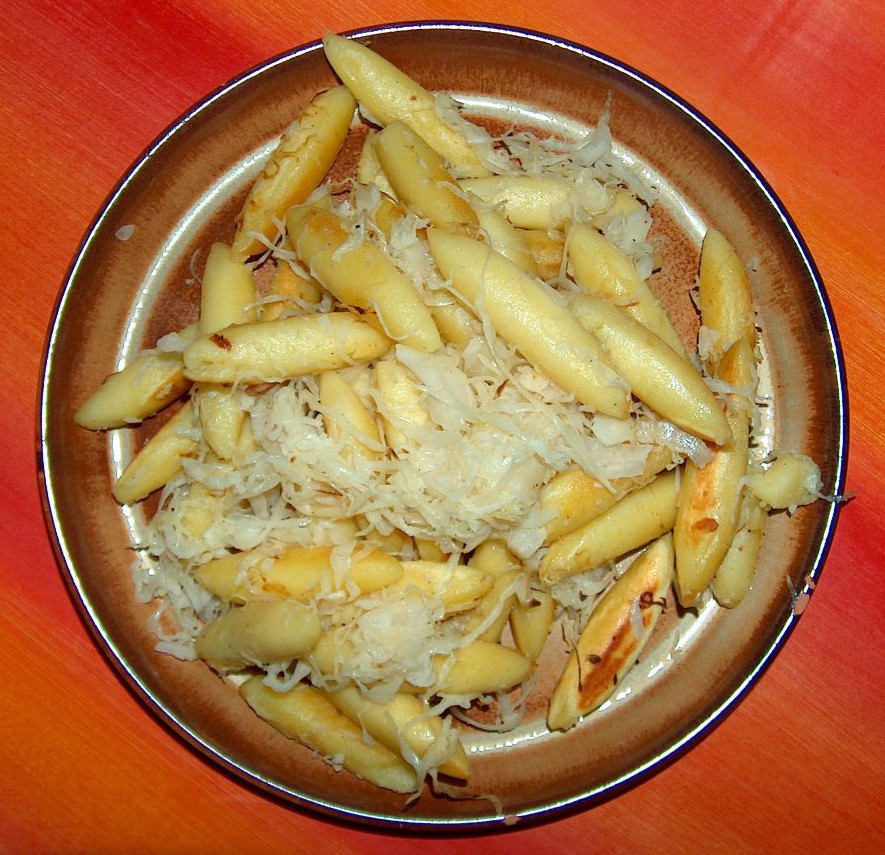
- Schupfnudeln with sauerkraut
- Alternative names: Fingernudeln
- Type: Dumpling
- Place of origin: Germany, Austria
- Main ingredients: Rye or wheat flour or potatoes, eggs

Schupfnudel (German; pl.: Schupfnudeln), also called Fingernudel (finger noodle), is a type of dumpling or thick noodle in southern German and Austrian cuisine. It is similar to the Central European kopytka and Italian gnocchi. They take various forms and can be referred to with a variety of names in different regions. They are usually made from rye or wheat flour and egg. Since the introduction of the potato to Germany in the seventeenth century, Schupfnudeln have also been made with potatoes. They are traditionally given their distinctive ovoid shape through hand-shaping. They are often served as a savory dish with sauerkraut, sage butter, or cream sauce, but are also served in sweet dishes.

== Development ==
Schupfnudeln have been known as a trooper dish since the Thirty Years' War: out of their daily flour ration and water the soldiers formed long noodles, which they cooked afterwards. After the potato was imported to and cultivated in Germany in the 17th century, the recipe was modified and different variations emerged in various regions.

== Regional terms and forms ==
Though they can be found throughout Germany, they are especially popular in the cuisine of Baden and Swabia. There, in addition to Schupfnudeln they are called Baunzen or Bubenspitzle.

In Bavarian cuisine they are known as Fingernudeln (finger noodles), Dradewixpfeiferl, Kartoffel- or Erdepfebaunkerl (potato Baunkerl) or Schupfnudeln, and in Upper Palatinate they are called Schopperla or Schoppala.

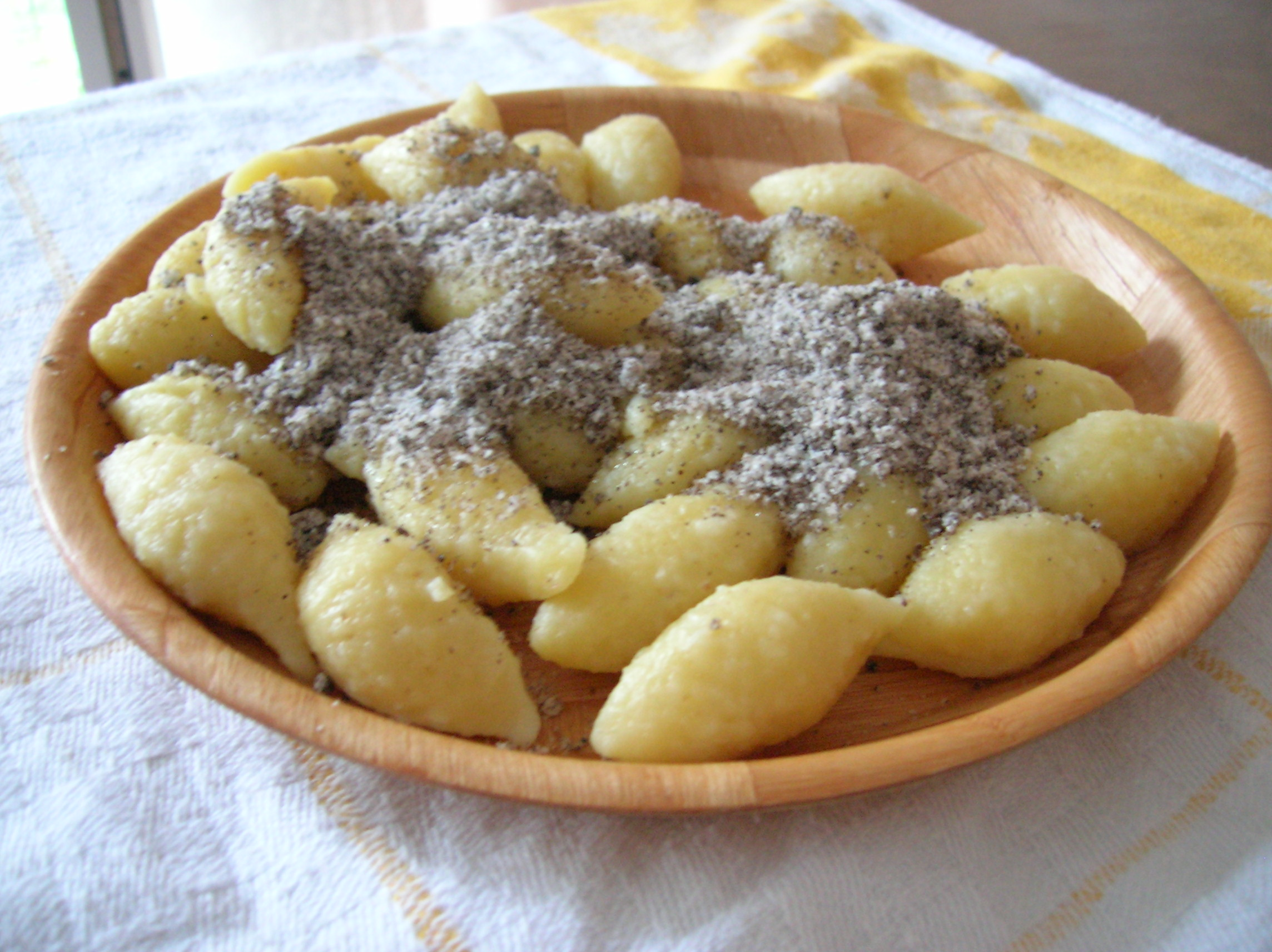
Mákos Nudli, eaten with poppy seeds in Hungary

In Hungary a similar pasta is called Nudli. It is eaten with poppy seeds, sour cream or jam (usually peach or cherry) and sometimes with cabbage.

In the Odenwald their name is Krautnudeln (cabbage noodles) and in the Palatinate they are called Buwespitzle. The Bauchstecherla in Franconia is a bit thinner and more pointed.

A special variety of these noodles is called Mohnnudeln (poppy seed noodles) and can be found throughout Bavaria and Austria.

== Etymology and preparation ==
The name Schupf- or Fingernudel refers to the preparation and shape of the noodle and not to the ingredients. The word Schupf comes from schupfen in the regional sense "to roll, flatten". There is no single authentic recipe; instead there are many widely different ways of preparation in different regions. Many of these variations claim to be the original and authentic Schupfnudeln.

This disagreement is reflected in reference works. The large 10-volume version of the Duden (the preeminent German dictionary) says that Schupfnudels are a fried dish while Ludwig Zehetner writes in his Bavarian Dictionary that they are boiled in salt water.

Simple recipes only use rye flour and water for the dough, but many recipes include mashed potatoes, wheat flour and egg. The dough is kneaded and then rolled into a long, thin cylinder. This roll is cut into pieces about half an inch in width. These are rolled into the typical shape of Schupfnudeln. Afterwards they are either cooked in salty water for about ten minutes or deep fried. Many recipes include frying them in a pan afterwards as well.

Subsequently, they are served in different ways: savory with sage butter, ham and cream sauce, or sauerkraut with bacon bits, or sweet with poppy seeds, sugar and cinnamon. In all cases it is necessary that the relatively bland noodles incorporate the flavor of the other ingredients. Schupfnudeln can be served either as a side dish or as a main dish.

Schupfnudeln pan fried with bacon bits and sauerkraut are commonly served at public wine festivals throughout Baden and Swabia. In Swabia, Schupfnudeln are often served with cold fruits like cold stewed apples or pears.

== Similar dishes ==
- Kartoffelklösse
- Garae-tteok
