= National symbols of Hungary =

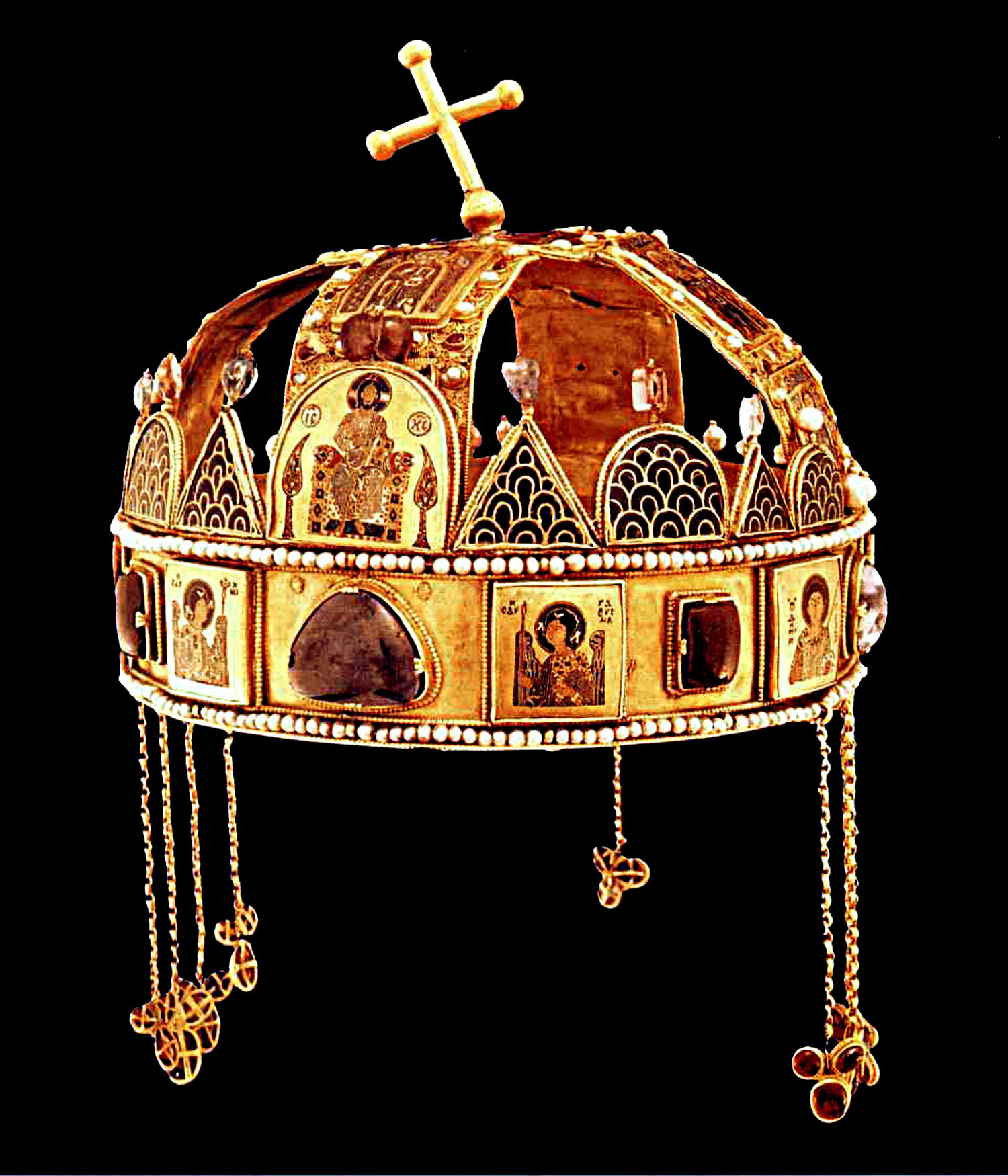
Holy Crown of Hungary

The Holy Right

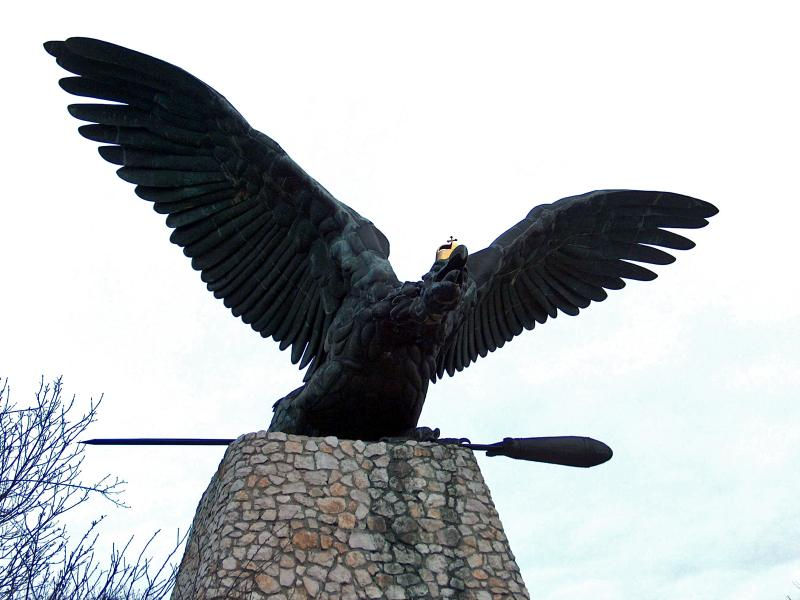
Turul, the Hungarian mythical symbol

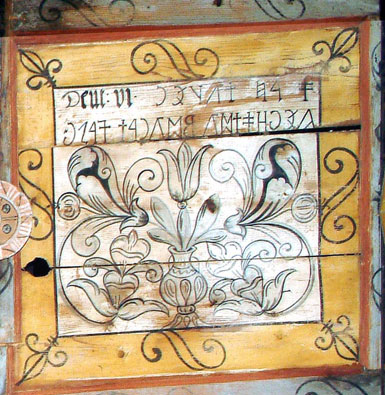
Old Hungarian script, the ancient Hungarian writing system

The national symbols of Hungary are flags, icons or cultural expressions that are emblematic, representative or otherwise characteristic of Hungary or Hungarian culture. The highly valued special Hungarian products and symbols are called Hungaricum or Hunnerisms.

== Flags and heraldry ==
The flag of Hungary is a horizontal tricolor of red, white and green. The coat of arms of the Árpád dynasty is also popular.

Flag of Hungary

Hungarian coat of arms

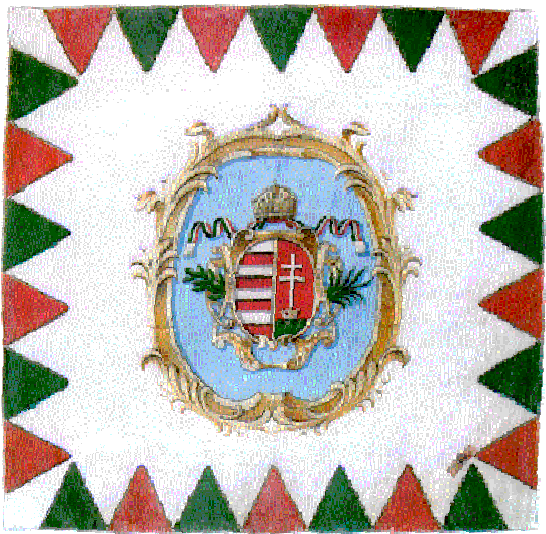
Hungarian military flag from the Revolution of 1848

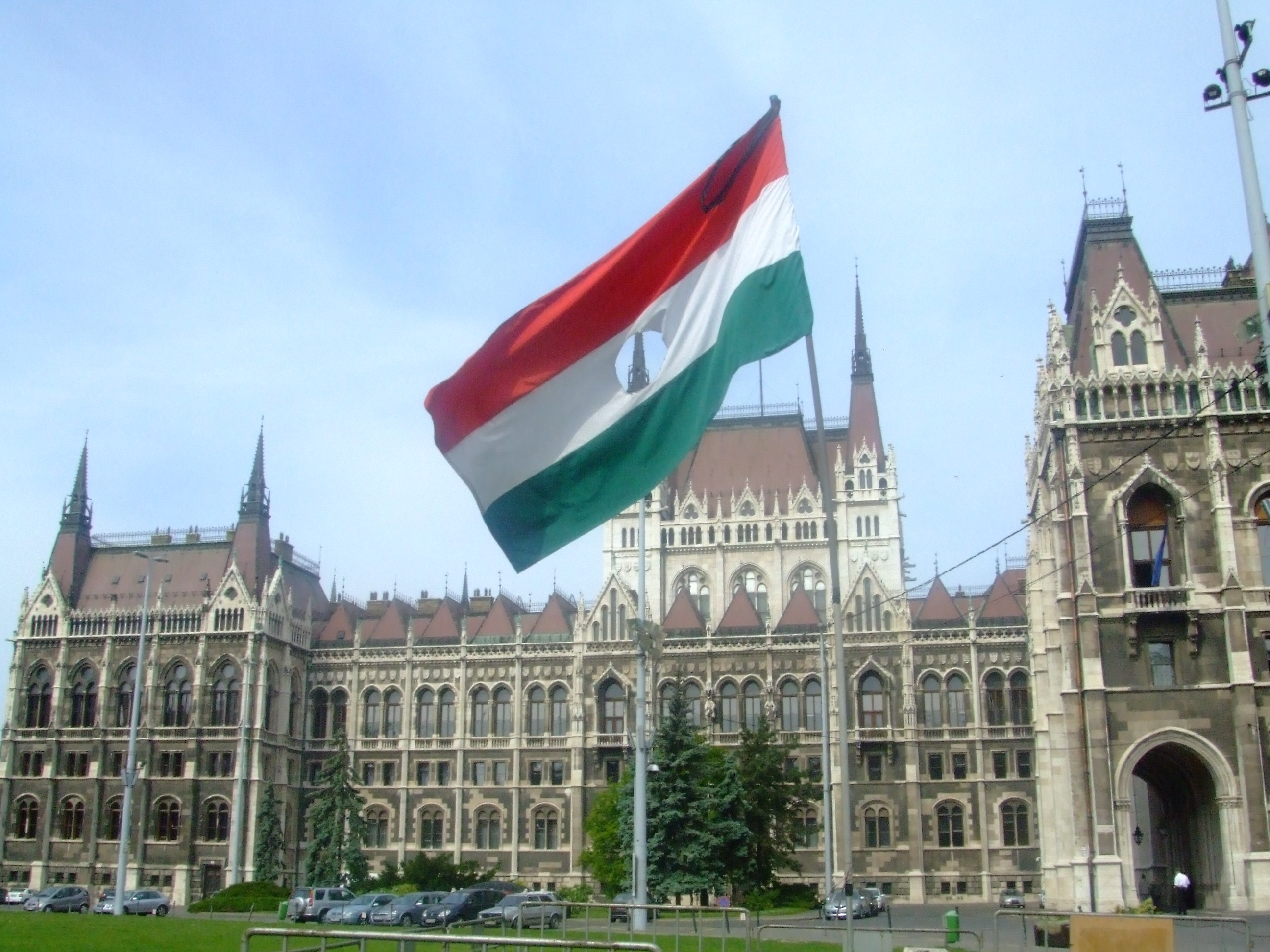
Hungarian revolution flag in front of the Hungarian Parliament Building

Coat of arms of the Árpád dynasty

== Flora and fauna ==
Almost a fifth of the country is forested, however only 10 percent is natural forest. Hungary is home to some 2,200 flowering plant species and, because of its topography and transitional climate, many of them are not normally found at this latitude. Much of the flora in the Villány and Mecsek Hills in Southern Transdanubia, for example, is usually seen only around the Mediterranean Sea. On the southern Szársomlyó Hill of the Villány Mountains, the formerly unknown Colchicum hungaricum (Hungarian Crocus) was found and botanically described in 1867 by the Hungarian botanist Viktor Janka. This is the earliest [native?] Hungarian flower to bloom.

The saline Hortobágy region on the Eastern Plain has many plants normally found on the seashore, and the Nyírség area is famous for meadow flowers. The Gemenc forest on the Danube River near Szekszárd, the Little Balaton in the center of Transdanubia, and the Tisza River backwater east of Kecskemét are important wetlands. Most of the trees in the nation's forests are deciduous beech, oak, and birch, and a small percentage are fir. Since the 14th century, over 250 new plants have colonized Hungary, of which almost 70 are considered invasive. Many such plants are perennial herbs that have slowly extirpated some native flora.

Historically, Hungary was the second largest supplier of paprika to the United States, despite the spice not being a product of a Hungarian native plant. Hungarian paprika has a distinctive flavor and is in great demand in Europe where it is used as a spice rather than as a coloring agent.

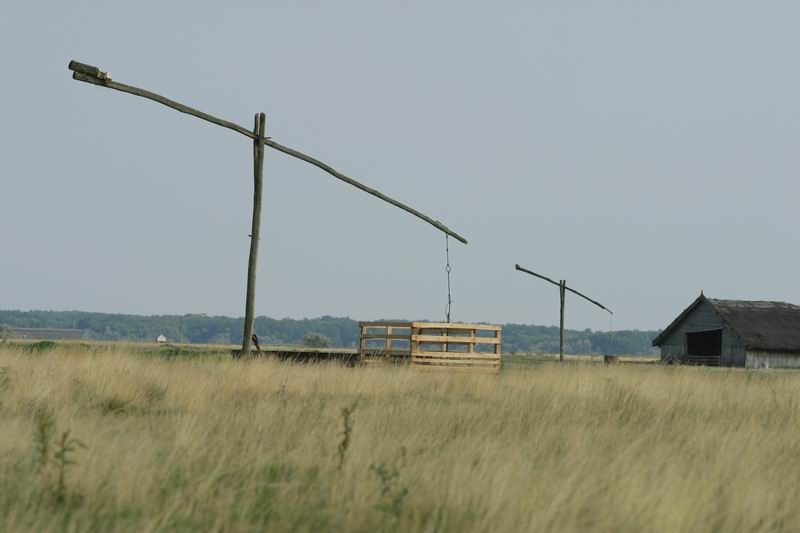
Hortobágy National Park, the Hungarian steppe

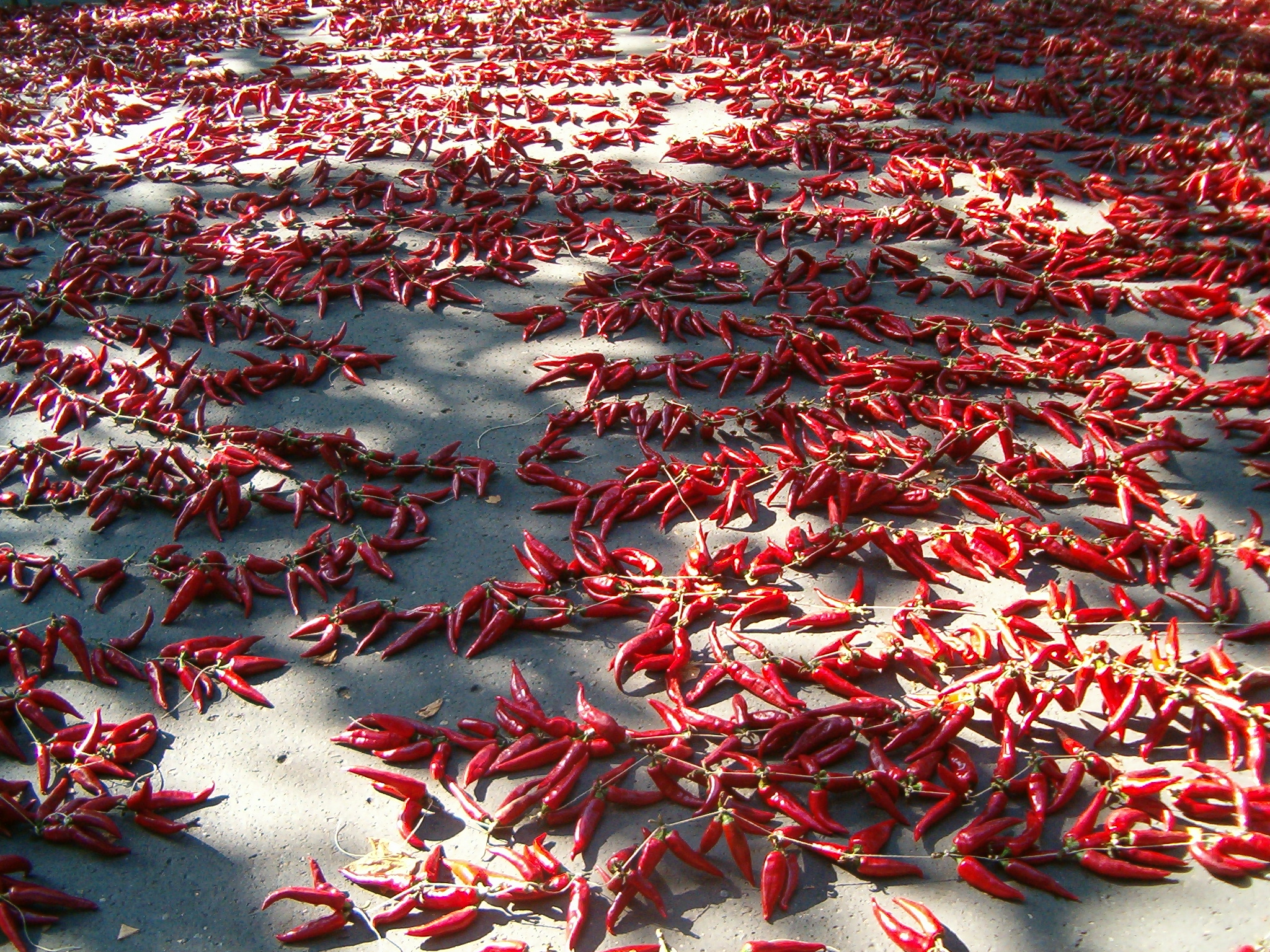
Szeged peppers set out to dry

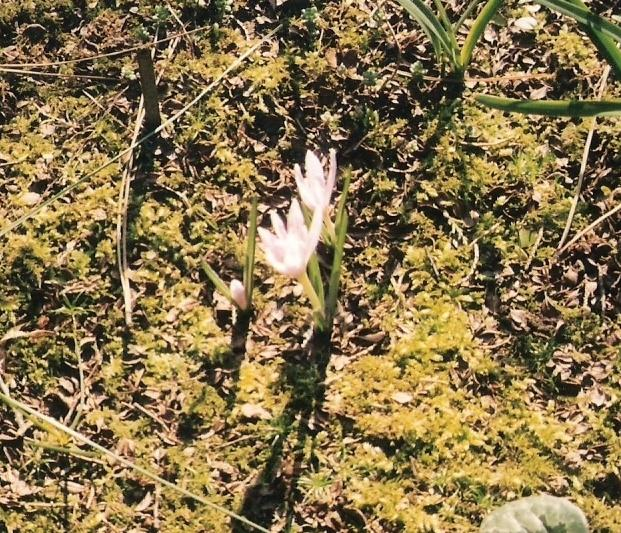
Hungarian Crocus, Colchicum hungaricum

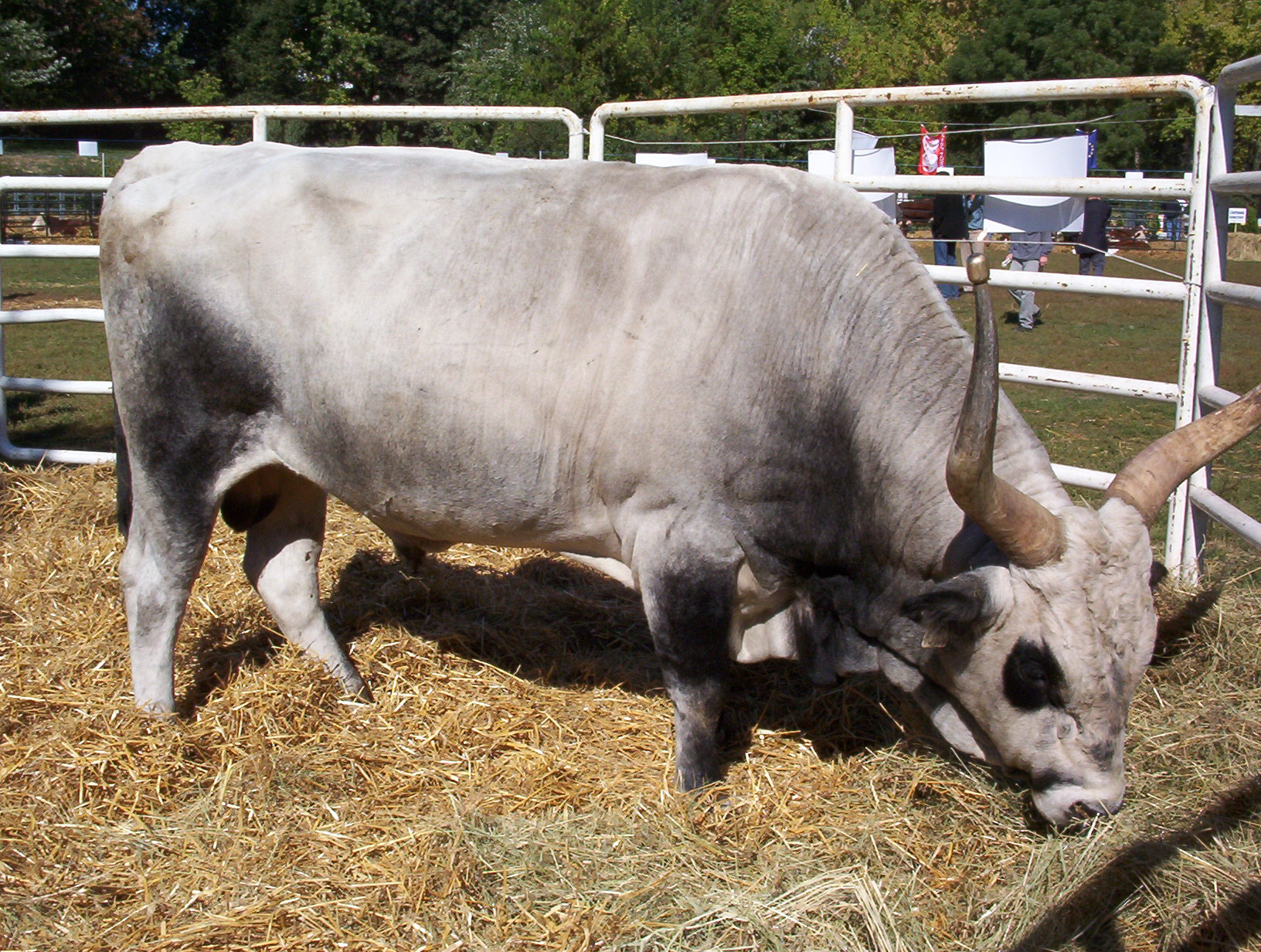
Hungarian Grey cattle

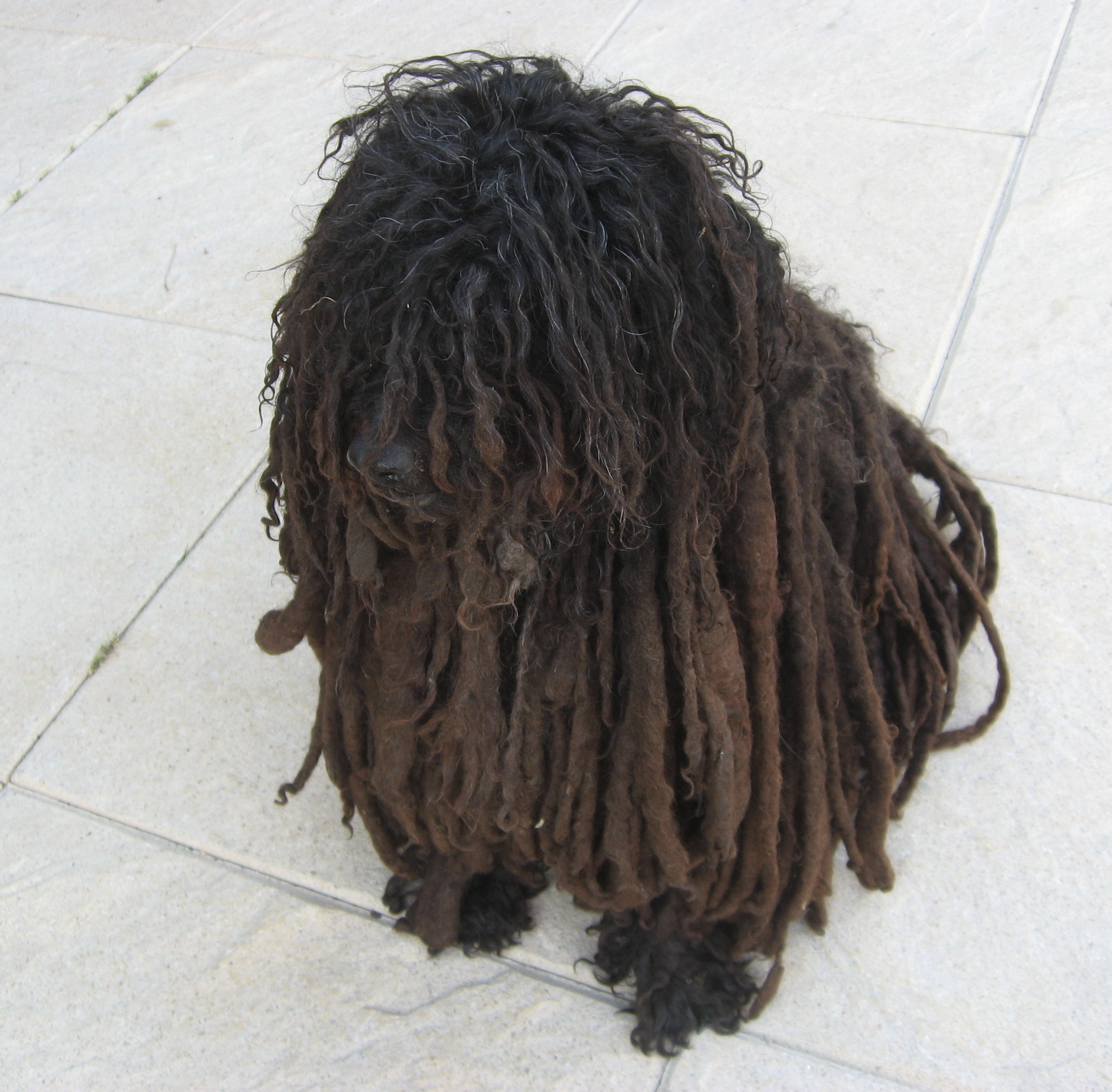
Puli (smaller) sheepdog

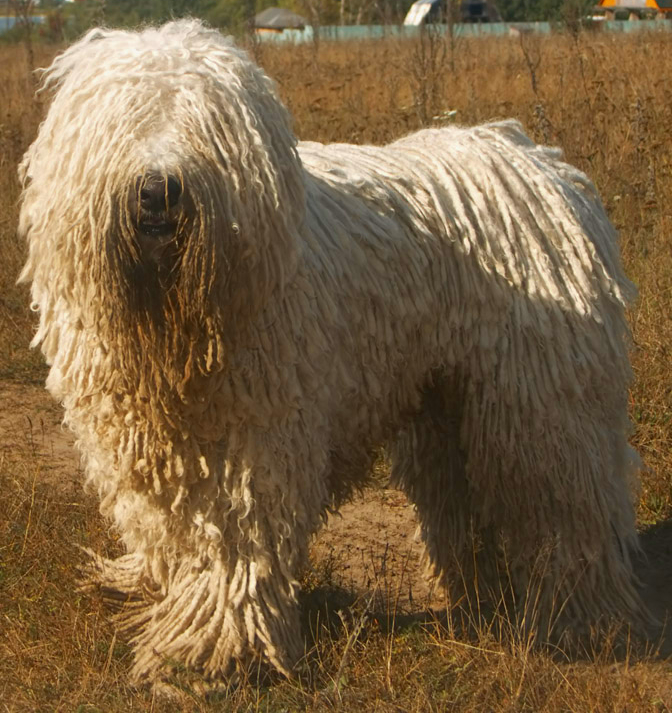
Komondor (larger) sheepdog

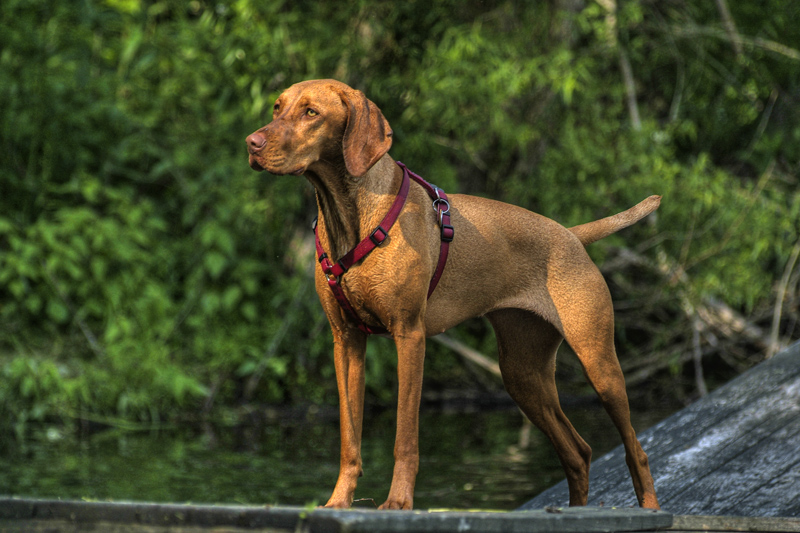
Vizsla

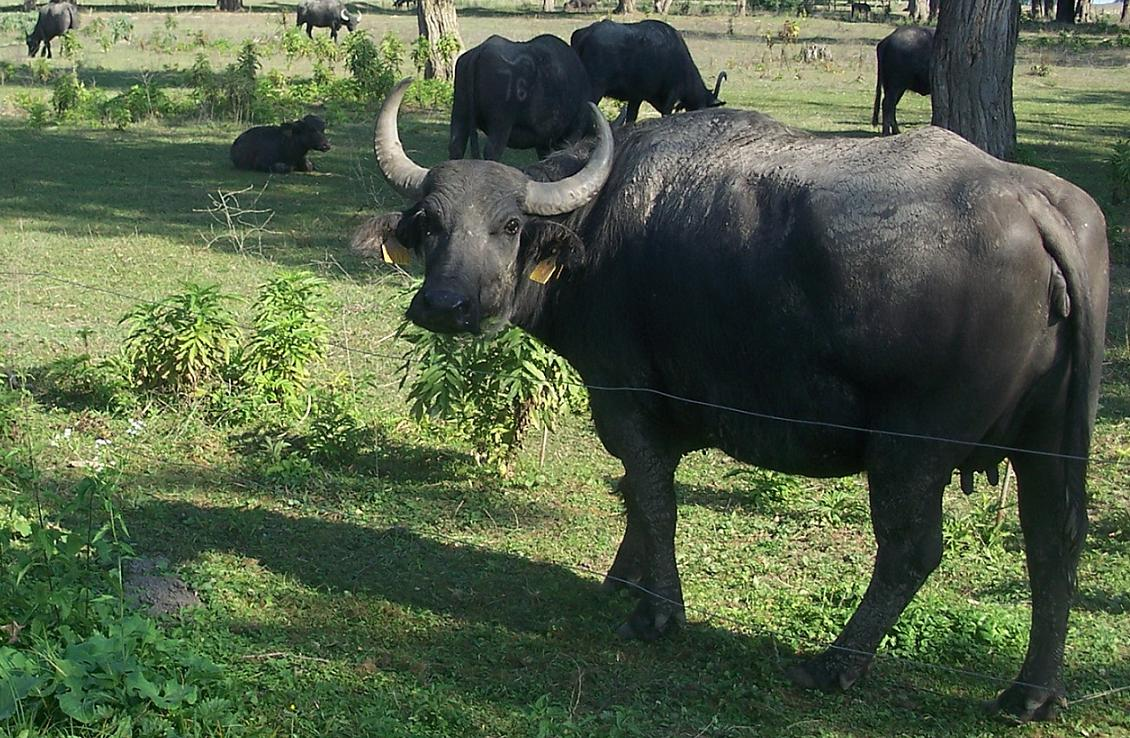
Hungarian Buffalo in the buffalo reserve of Kápolnapuszta, Zala county

== People ==
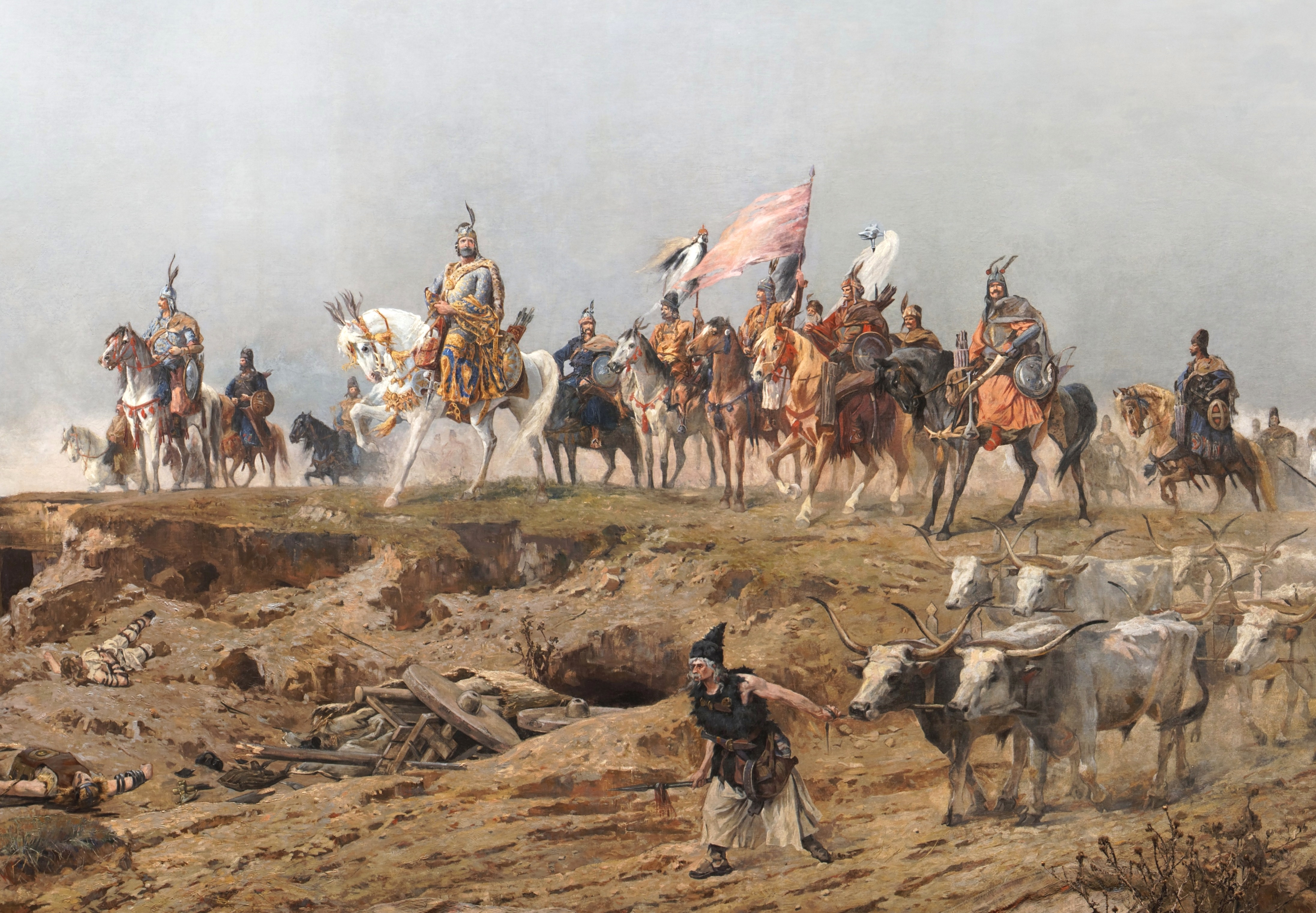
Arrival of the Hungarians in the 9th century

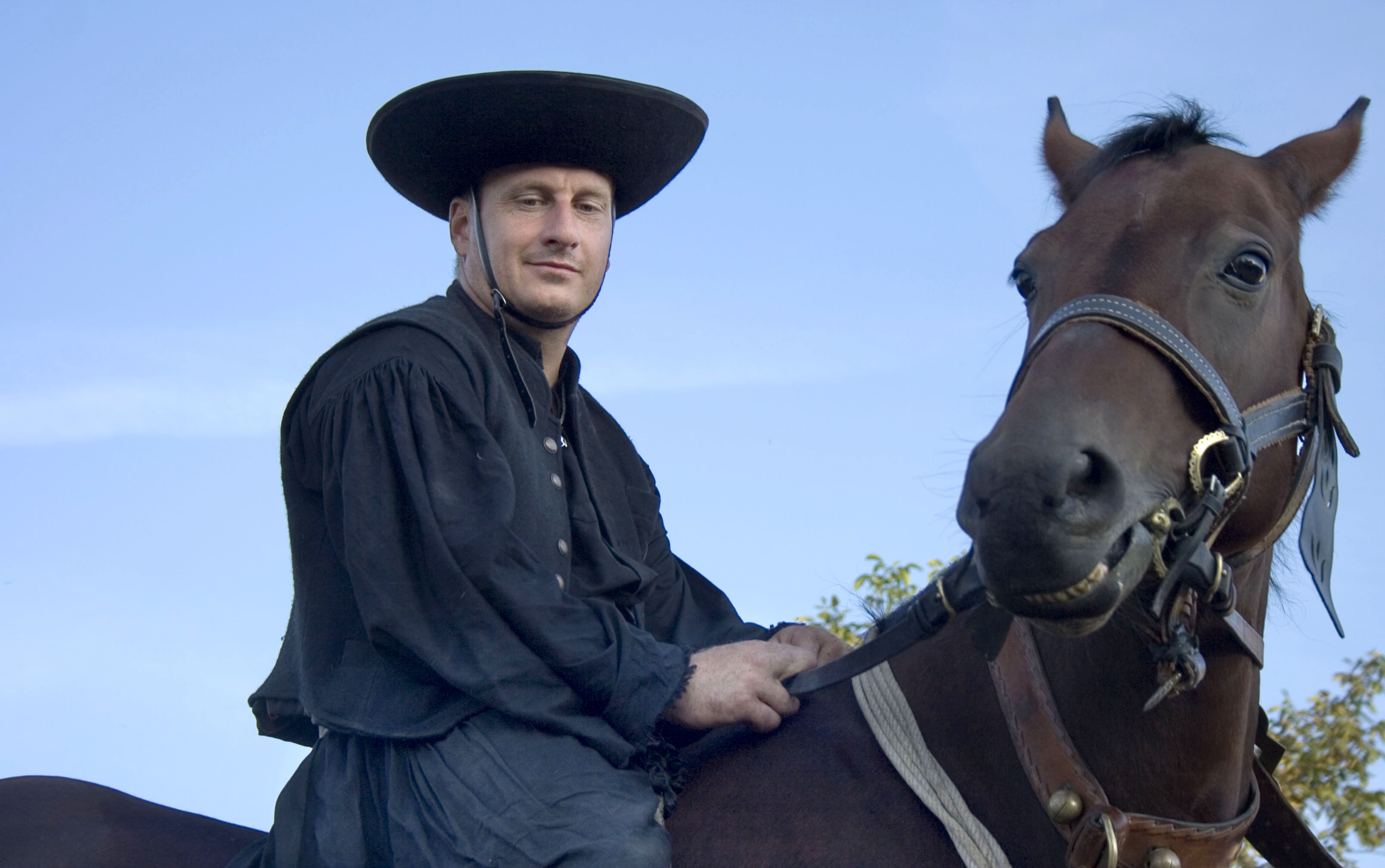
Wrangler (csikós)

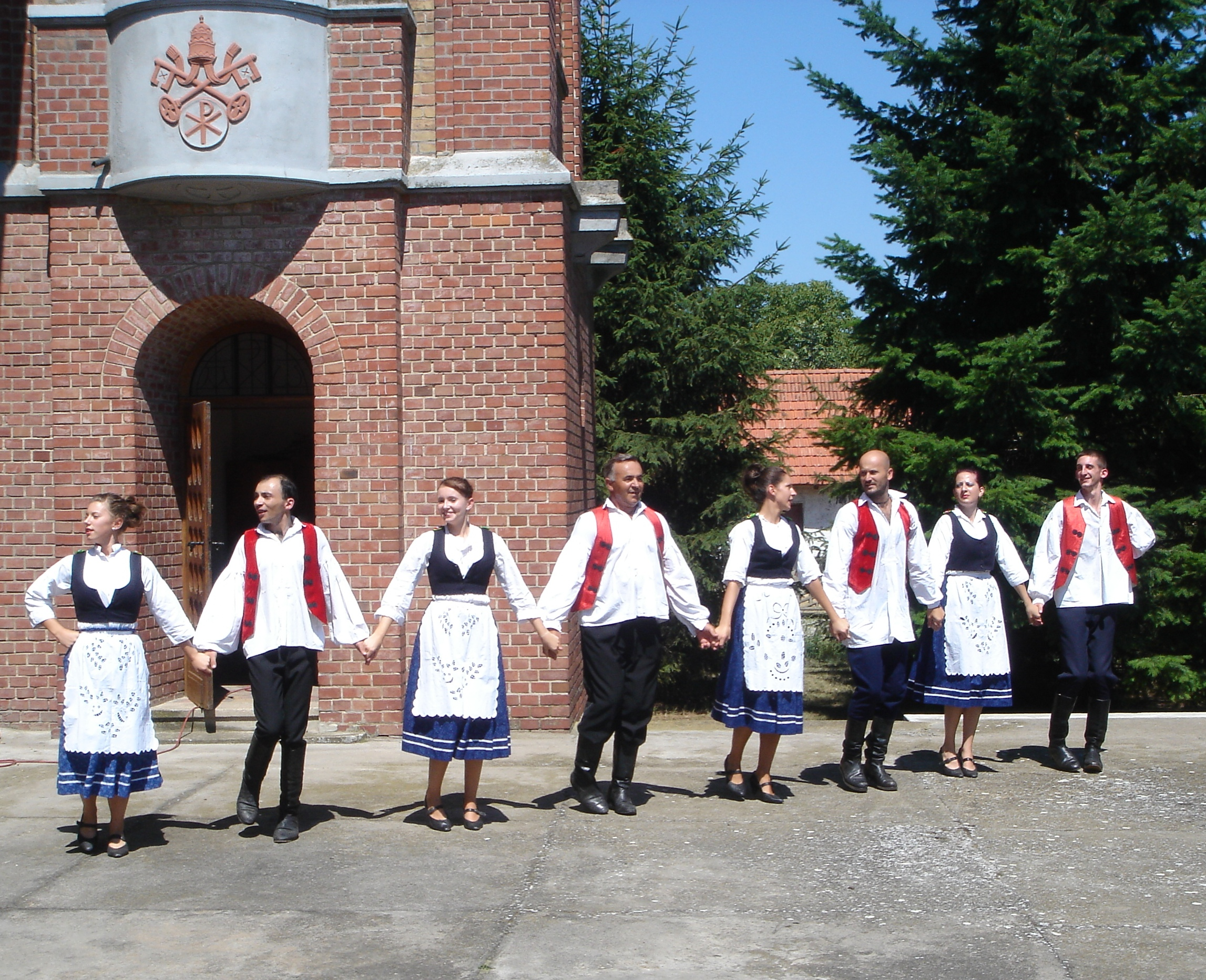
Traditional Hungarian dance

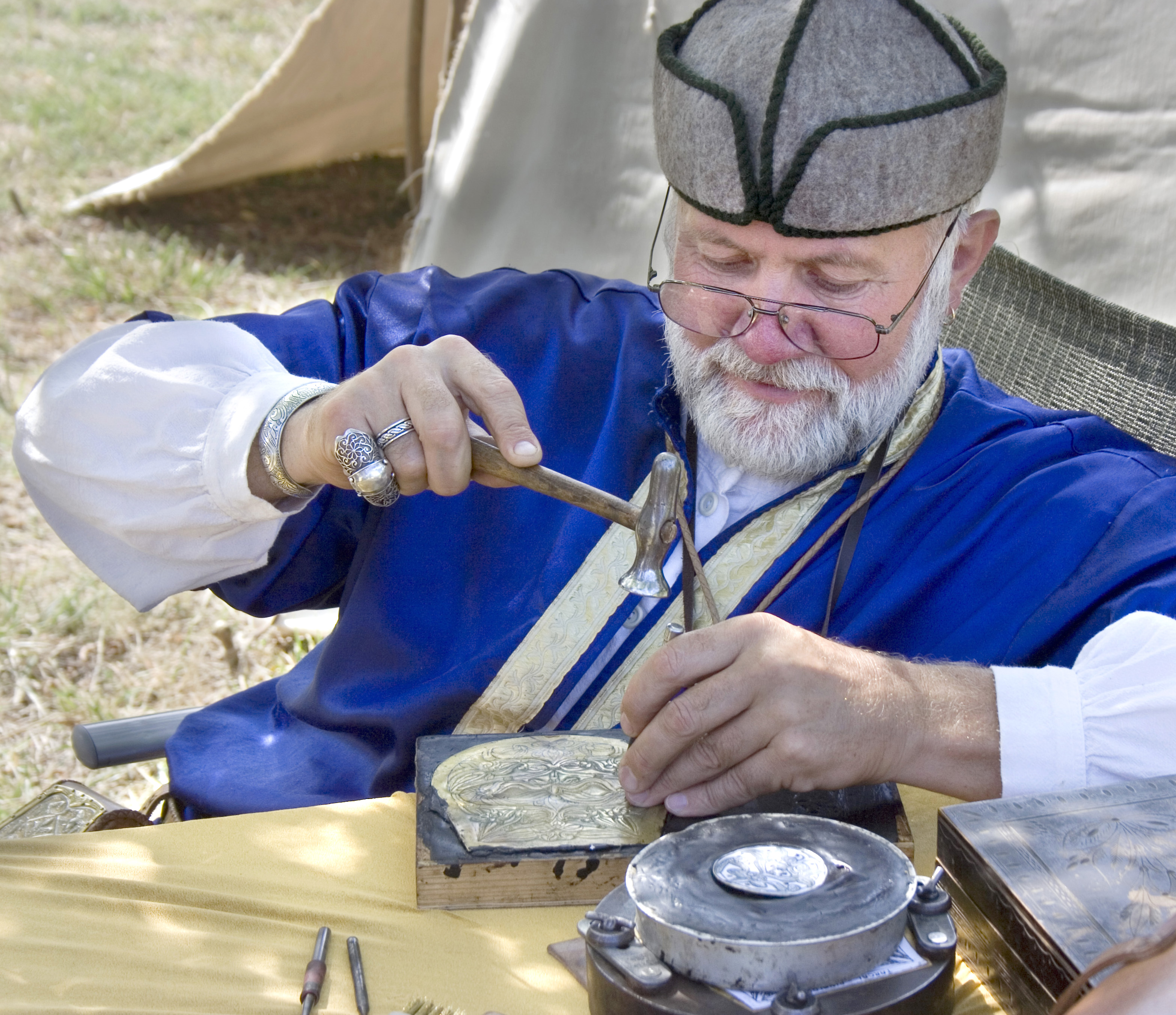
Master coppersmith at work

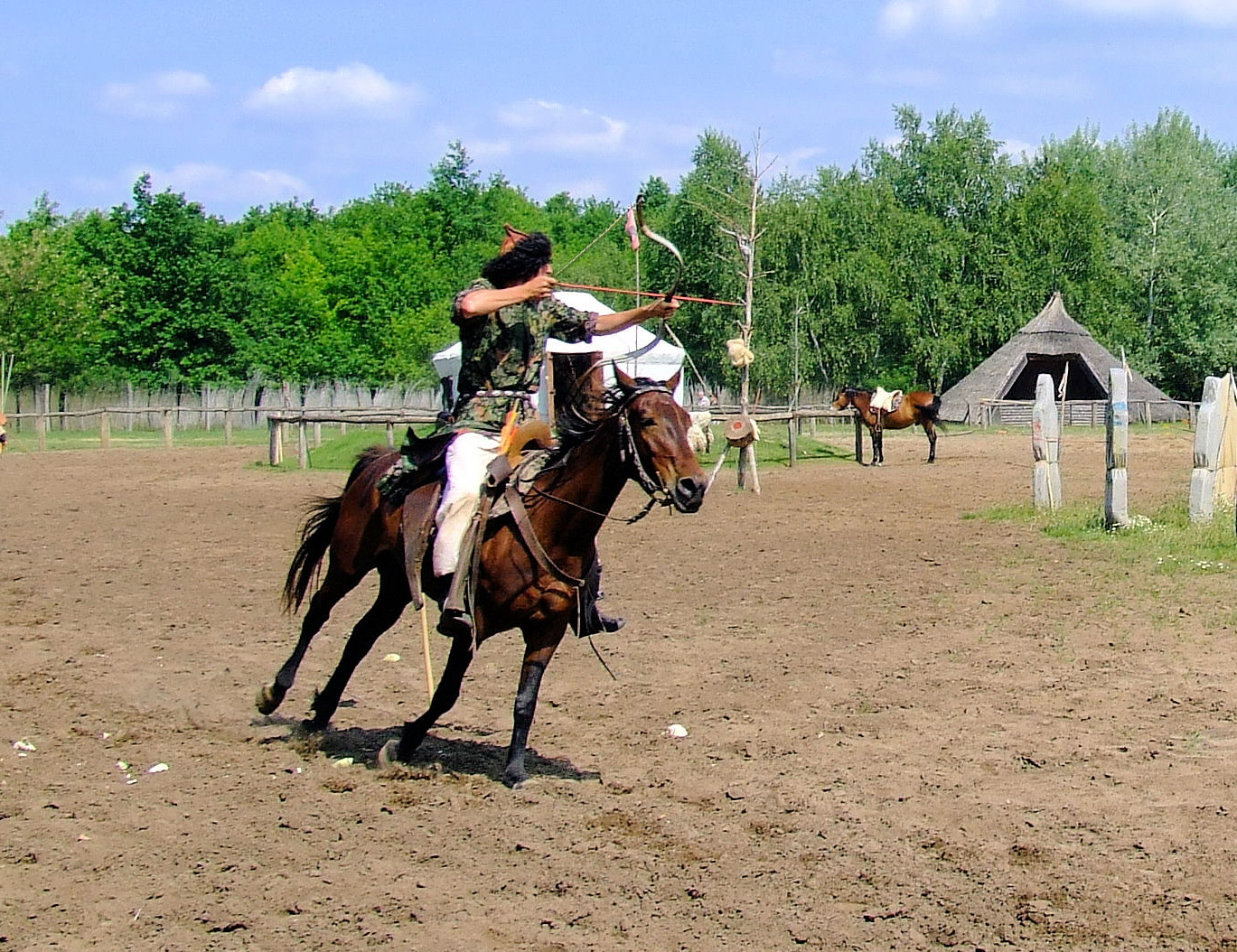
Horse archer

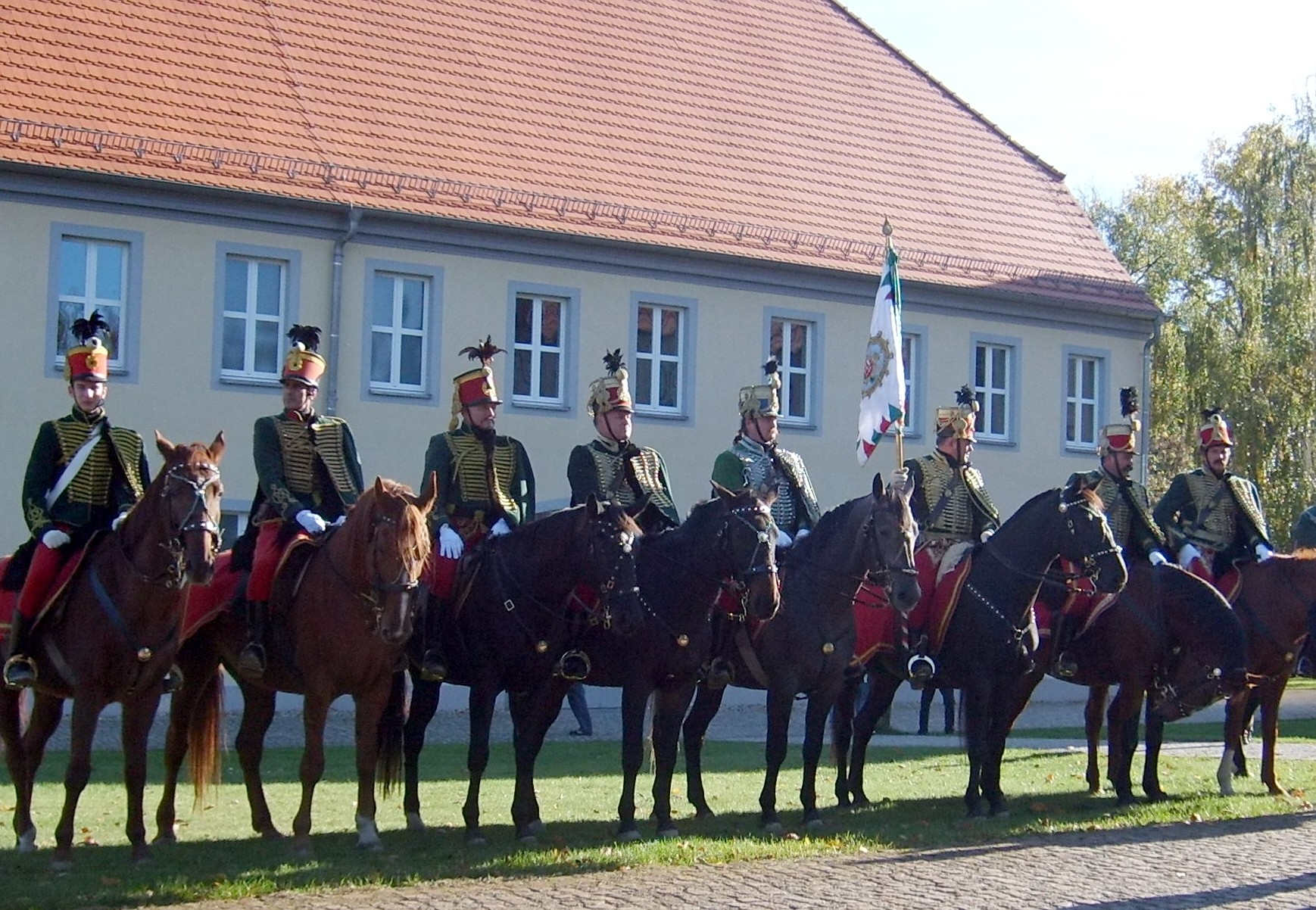
Hungarian Hussars in Elsterwerda

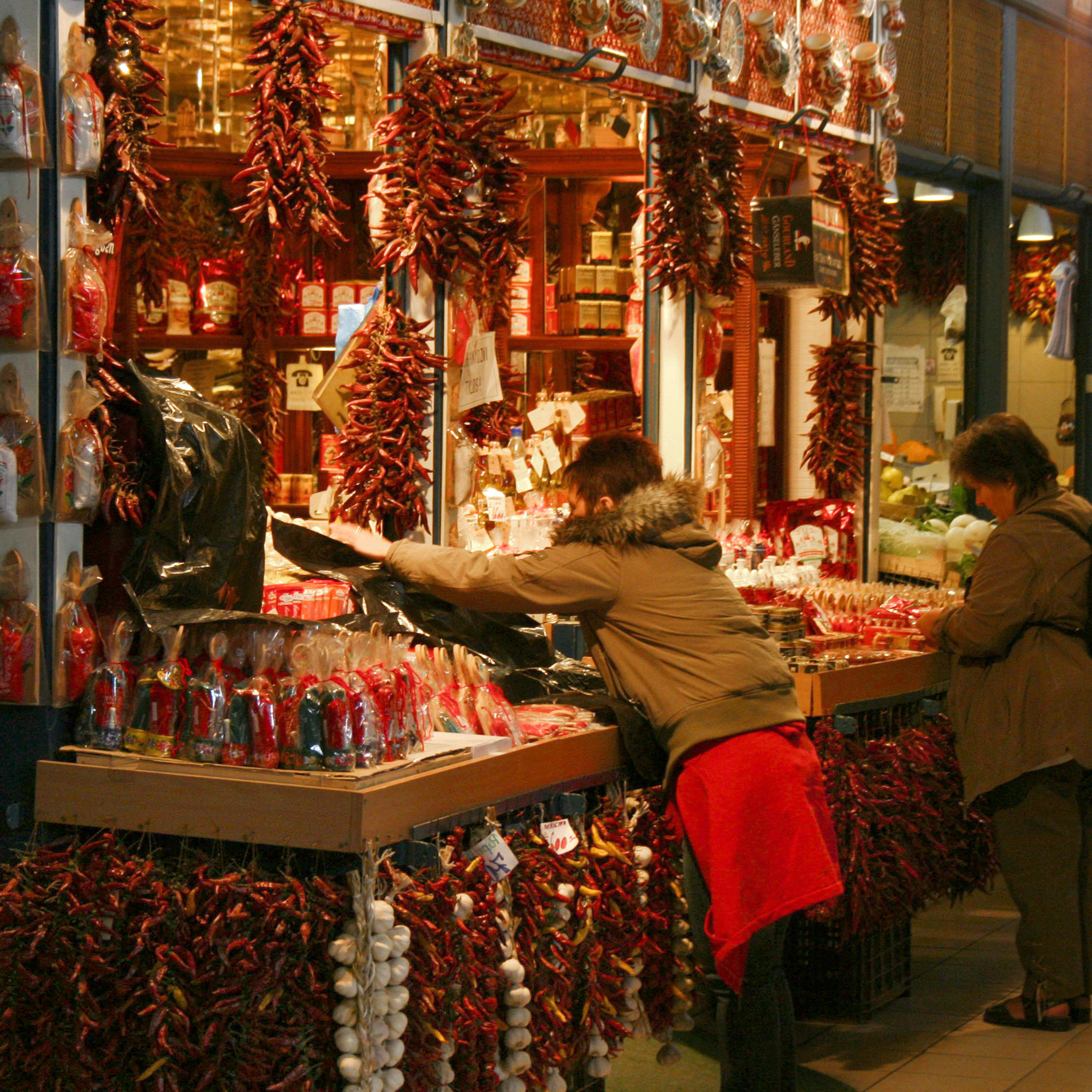
Paprika vendor in Budapest

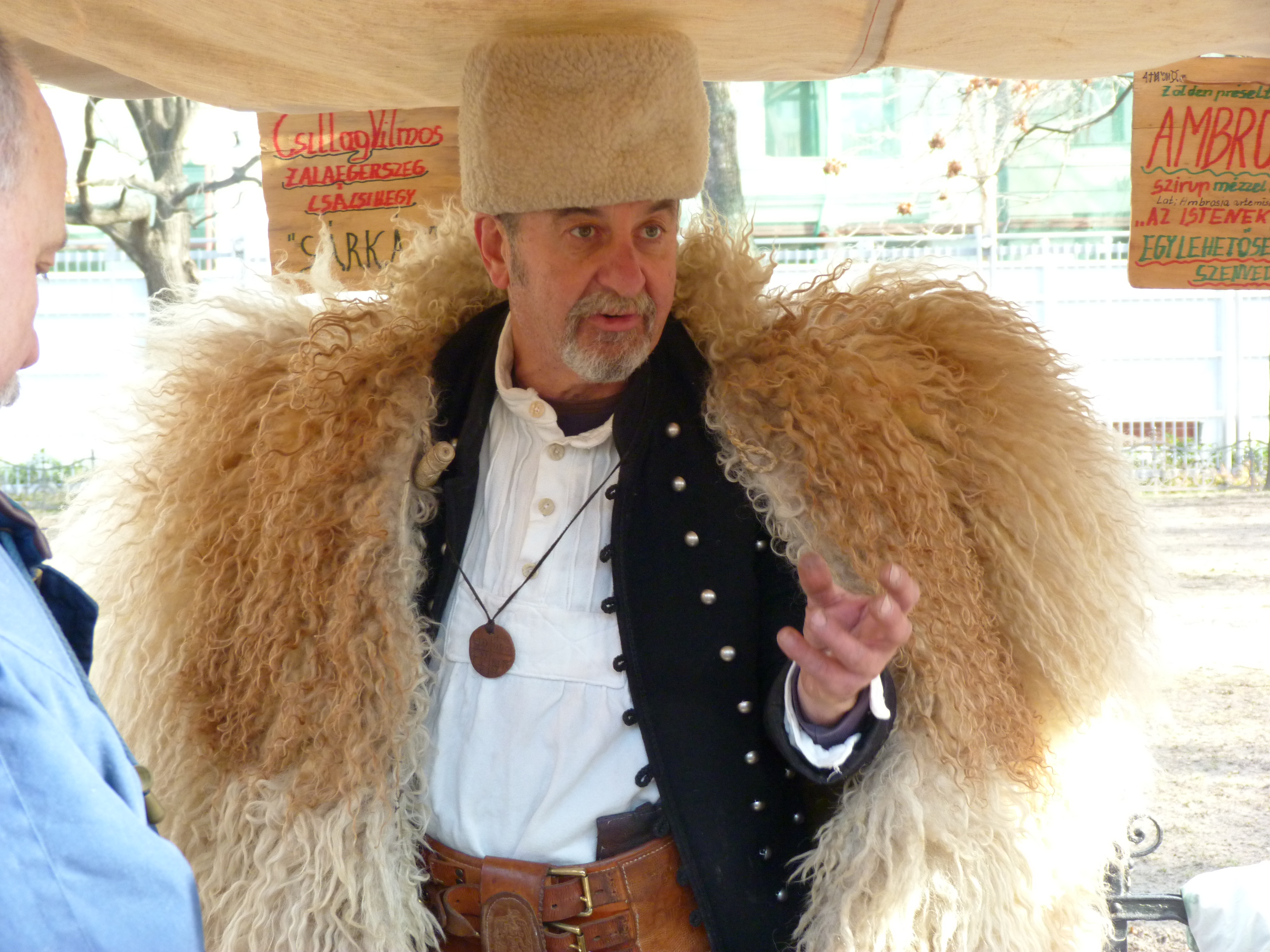
Traditional clothes of a gulyás (herdsman)

=== National Anthem ===
"Himnusz" was adopted in the 19th century and the first stanza is sung at official ceremonies. The words were written by Ferenc Kölcsey, a nationally renowned poet in 1823, and its currently officially recognised musical setting was composed by romantic composer Ferenc Erkel in 1844, although other, lesser known musical versions exist.

The Rákóczi March sometimes known as the "Hungarian March" was one of the unofficial state anthems of Hungary before Ferenc Kölcsey wrote the Himnusz.

=== Food and drink ===
The traditional Hungarian dishes abound in piquant flavors and aromas. Dishes are flavorful, spicy and often rather heavy. Flavors of Hungarian dishes are based on centuries-old traditions in spicing and preparation methods. The exquisite ingredients are produced by local agricultural and husbandry. Paprika, onion and garlic are to be found everywhere. In the Middle Ages the fish soup was the most popular and the most lovely fishmeal in Hungary. A cookery book from 1860 contains 400 fish recipes. The most well-known specialities of Hungarian cuisine such as goulash soup, the different varieties of stew and paprikás are red with paprika.

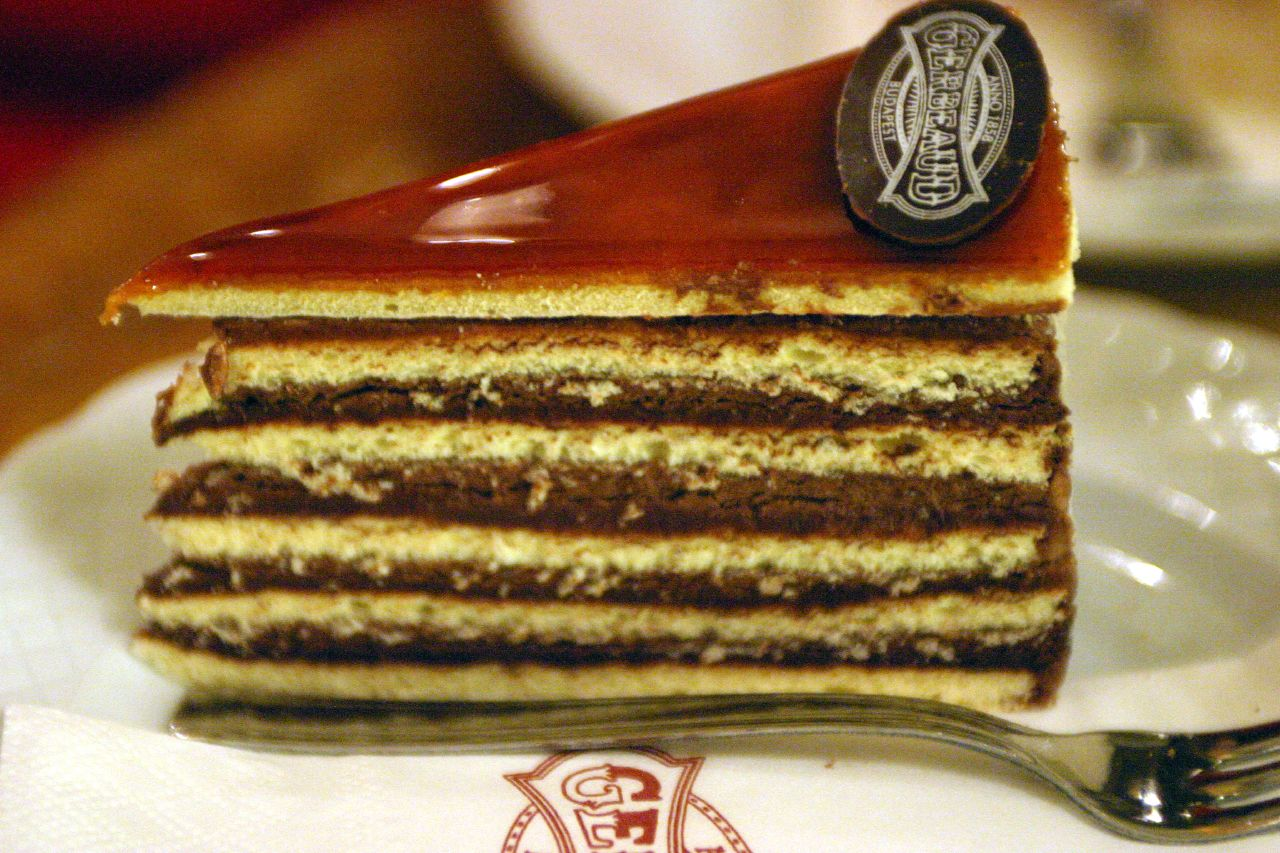
Dobos torte

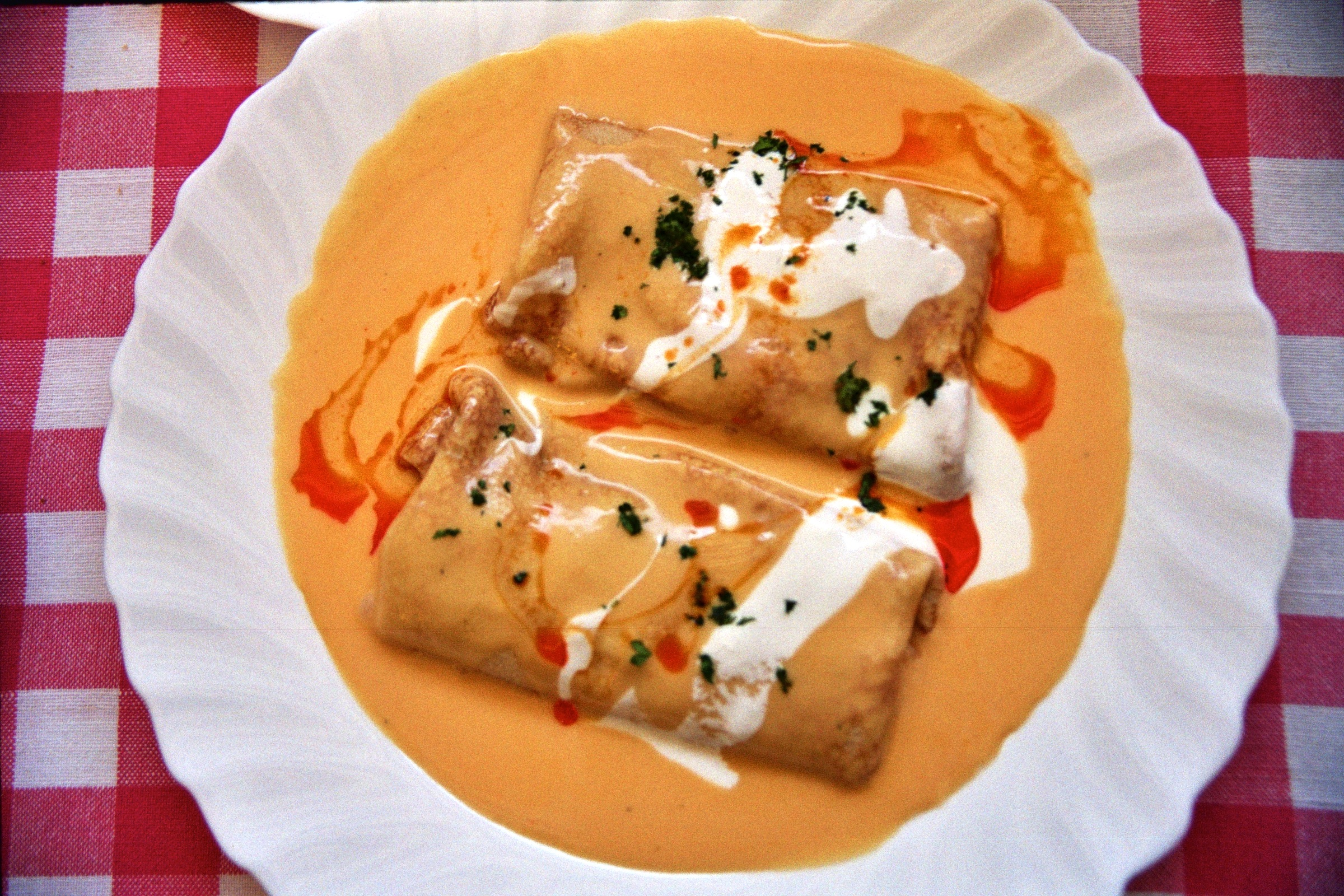
Hortobágyi palacsinta (filled pancake)

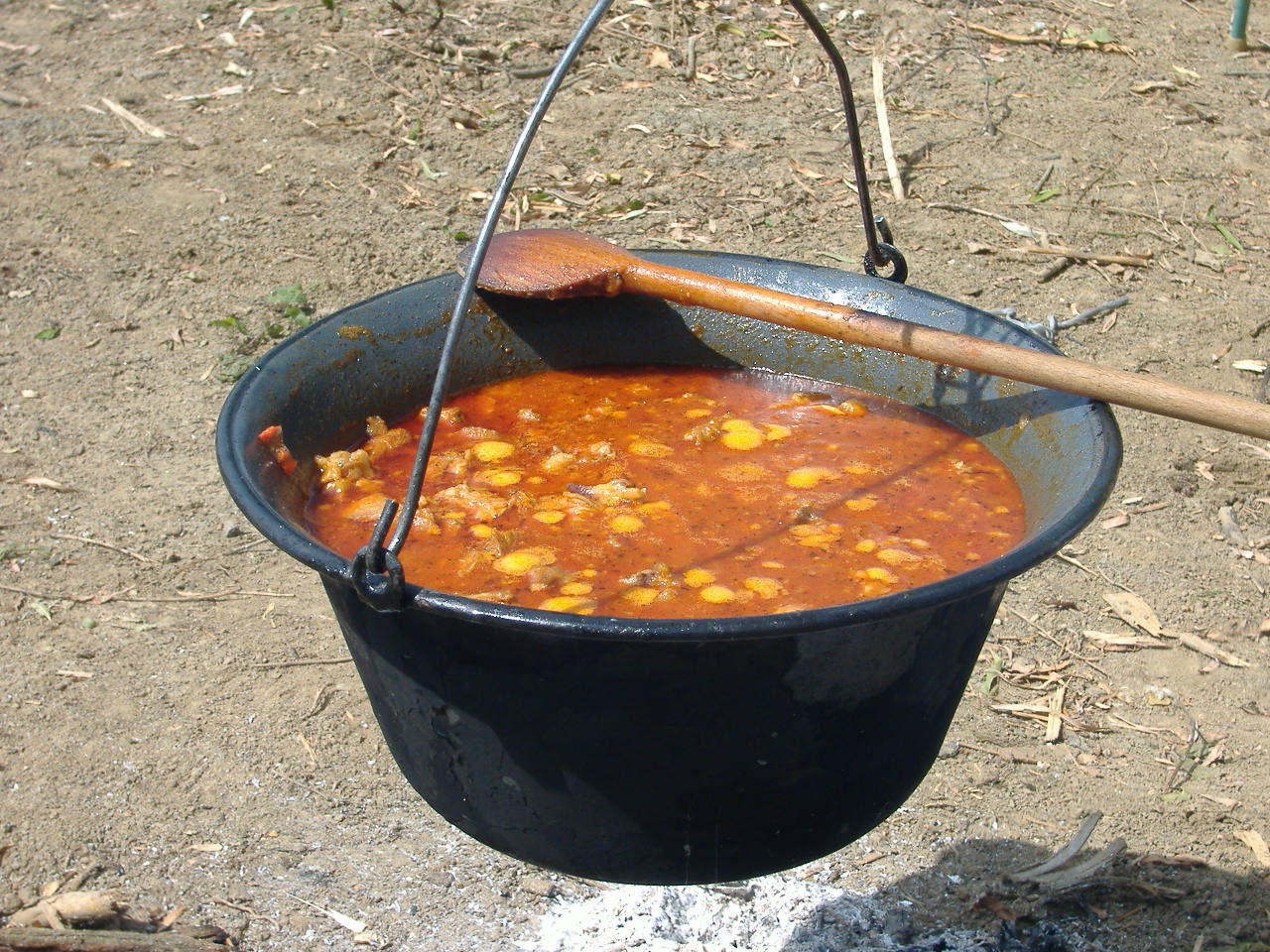
Goulash

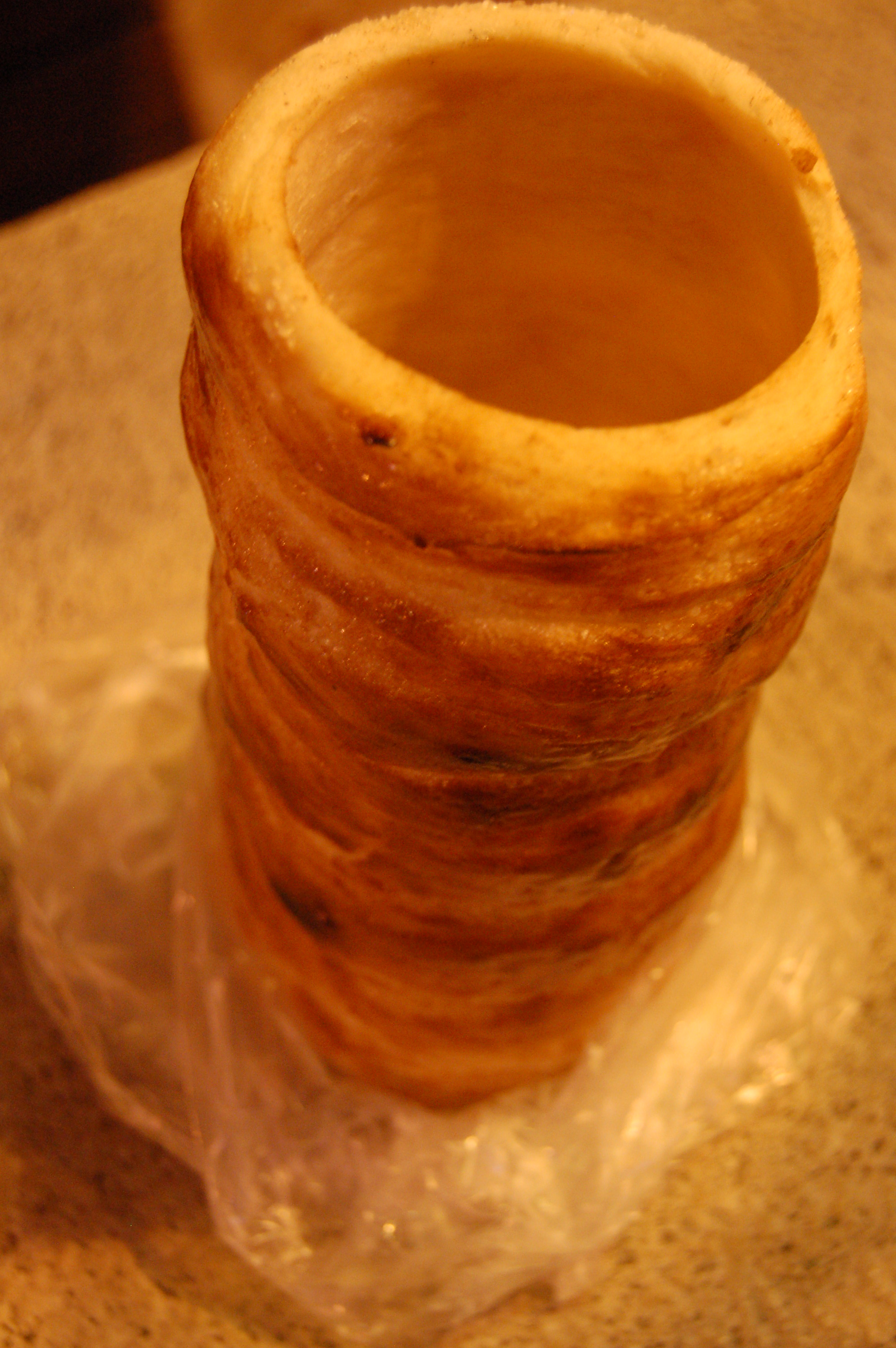
Kürtőskalács chimney cake

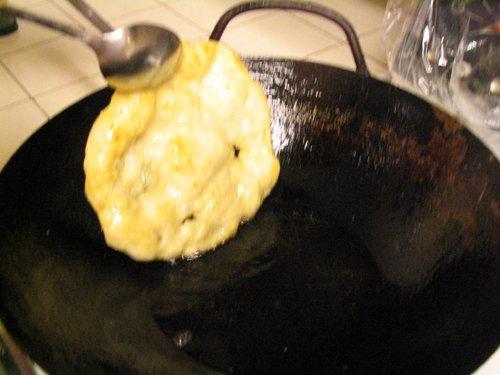
Fresh made lángos

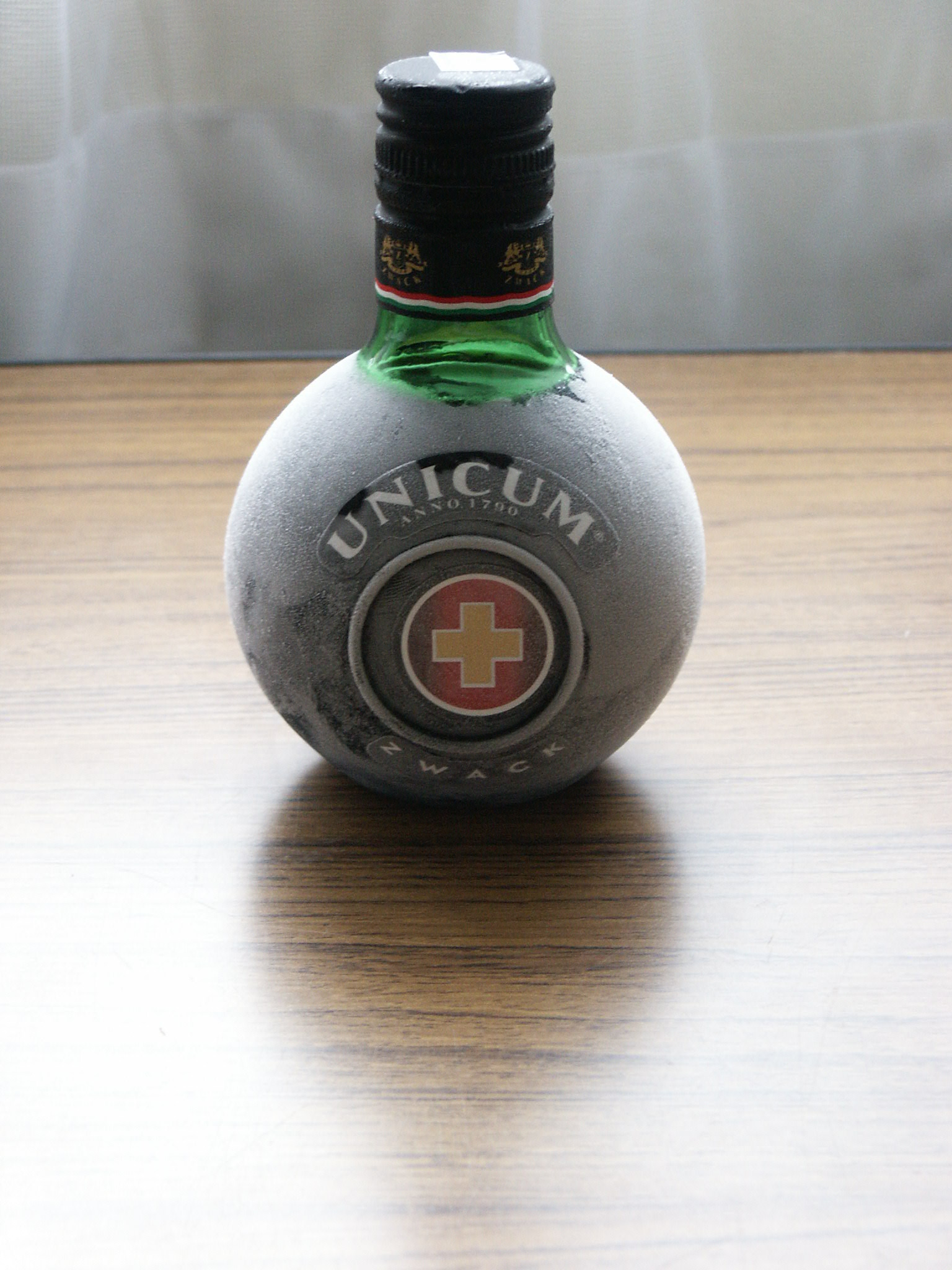
A cold bottle of Unicum

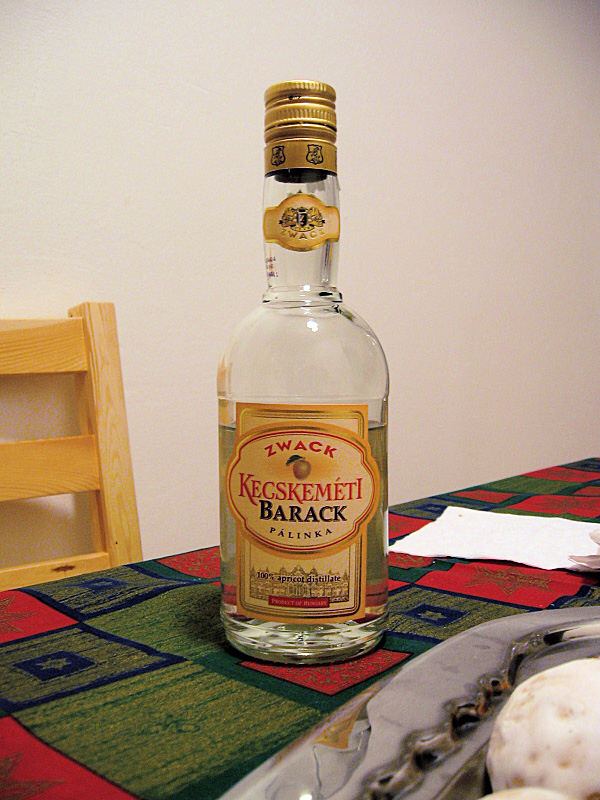
Pálinka

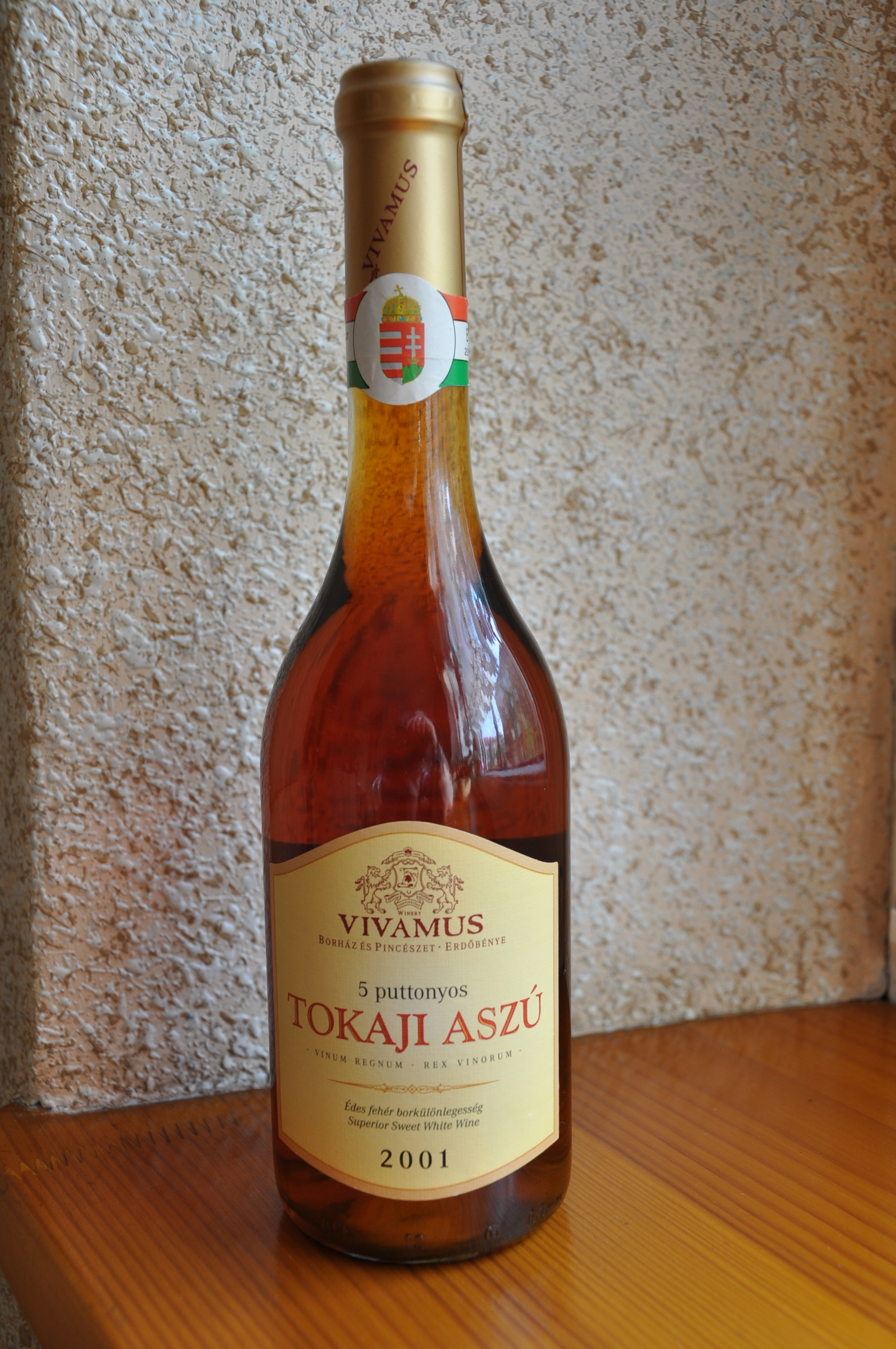
Tokaji wine, "Vinum Regum, Rex Vinorum" ("Wine of Kings, King of Wines")

== See also ==
- Hungary
- List of Hungarian dishes
- Ópusztaszer National Heritage Park
