= List of Hungarian dishes =

This is a list of dishes found in Hungarian cuisine.

== Soups and stews ==
Name	Image	Region	Description
Borleves			A fresh and strong wine soup.
Csirkepaprikás			A stew with a lot of sweet paprika, cream or sour cream called tejföl.
Csontleves			A basic bone broth, usually served with spaghetti noodles, carrots, and turnips. It may also be served with stewed meat (usually pork), meat bones or parsley.
Főzelék			A type of thick Hungarian vegetable stew or soup, similar to pottage.
Gombaleves			A soup made from various wild mushrooms, often added with sour cream, but not necessarily the same as the cream of mushroom soup.
Gombapaprikás			A mushroom paprikash, which is a traditional vegetarian dish of the Hungarians.
Gulyás; Goulash			A stew of meat and vegetables, seasoned with paprika and other spices.
Gulyásleves			A Hungarian soup, made of beef, vegetables, ground paprika and other spices.
Gyümölcsleves		Southwestern Hungary	A chilled, sweet soup with redcurrants, blackberries, sour cherries, apple, pear, quince or other seasonal fruit mix. It is fast cooked with cream or whole milk, some spices often accompanied with fruits, like cloves and cinnamon and sugar.
Halászlé; Fisherman's Soup			A hot, spicy, and paprika-based river fish soup, originating as a dish of Hungarian cuisine, that is prepared with generous amounts of hot paprika and carp or mixed river fish.
Húsleves; Chicken soup			A clear chicken or veal meat soup with soup vegetables and thin soup pasta called csipetke.
Jókai bableves Jókai bean soup			A rich bean soup, with many vegetables, smoked pork hock pieces and noodles. It is often made to be spicy or some sort of hot chili offered with it.
Köménymagleves			A fresh and hot caraway seed soup.
Krumplileves			Made from potatoes in a broth, frequently with slices of sausage, carrots, turnips or sour cream.
Lecsó		Southeastern Hungary	A mixed vegetable stew, made of primarily tomato and paprika, also found throughout the Balkans and Central Europe. It is somewhat similar to ratatouille, but without squash and zucchini. A variety exists called tojásos lecsó (lecsó with eggs), which has scrambled eggs mixed in.
Marhapörkölt			A stew, which is very similar to chicken paprikash, except using beef.
Meggyleves; Sour cherry soup			A slightly sweet soup made with sour cream, sugar and whole fresh sour cherries, and served as chilled.
Pacalleves			A tripe soup eaten primarily by Hungarians living in Transylvania, usually seasoned with vinegar, sour cream, and garlic. May be eaten with bread and hot paprika on the side. Known as ciorbă de burtă for Romanians.
Palócleves		Northeastern Hungary	A soup similar to gulyásleves, but containing green beans and sour cream, and frequently flavoured with dill. It is invented by János Gundel, who is the father of the famed chef Károly Gundel, and named for Kálmán Mikszáth and his writings about the Palóc people of northern Hungary and southern Slovakia.
Paprikás krumpli			A paprika-based stew with spicy sausage and potatoes.
Pörkölt			A meat stew in a thick paprika-spiced sauce, similar to ragout; generally translated into English as goulash (not to be confused with goulash soup).
Sólet			A Jewish-Hungarian stew made with kidney beans, barley, onions, paprika, and perhaps meat and eggs as well. It is similar to cholent.
Sóskaleves			Made from sorrel leaves in a broth, often with boiled eggs as well. Similar to green borscht, but thicker.
Székelygulyás (Székelykáposzta)		Transylvania	A hardy pork and sauerkraut stew, often flavored with paprika, onion, and sour cream. Despite its name, it does not originally come from Transylvania (Erdély), and is instead named after the Hungarian writer József Székely (a friend and contemporary of Sándor Petőfi), who apparently asked a kocsmáros (tavernman) to mix together leftover savanyúkáposzta-főzelék (sauerkraut pottage) and sertéspörkölt (pork stew) to create it.
Tojásleves			Same as köménymagleves, except with scrambled eggs added. Similar to the Slovenian national dish, prežganka.
Vadgombaleves			A wild mushroom soup that originated in southern Hungary.
Zöldségleves			A soup with vegetables, such as peas, carrots, turnips, and parsley.

== Meat dishes ==
Name Other names	Image	Region	Description
Bécsi szelet		Austria	A Bécsi szelet is literally a "Viennese slice" in English.
Brassói aprópecsenye			This dish is clearly named after Brassó, the former Hungarian name for Brașov, but it is unclear how, and various legends have arisen as explanation. It consists of diced pieces of pork and potatoes, which are pan-fried with onions, bacon, and seasoning (salt, pepper or paprika). This dish, despite the simple ingredients, need some practice to master.
Christmas carp		Central Europe	Christmas carp is a fish dish traditionally eaten on Christmas Eve throughout Central Europe. The carp is traditionally kept alive in a bathtub for a week before being eaten.
Cigánypecsenye			A variant on pecsenye which literally translates as Gypsy roast. Consists of fried or spit-roasted pork cutlets, with thick bacon as well, which are spiced with paprika, salt or pepper. Usually served with roasted potatoes or french fries, or perhaps savanyúság (pickled vegetables) (pictured).
Fasírozott			Flat, pan-fried meatballs, made from minced meat (usually pork, veal or beef), with paprika and salt added for taste. Often eaten with főzelék, or served with rice or french fries.
Pacalpörkölt			A pörkölt made of all special kinds of tripe.
Pecsenye; Hungarian Mixed Grill			A thin pork steak served with cabbage or the dish fatányéros, a Hungarian mixed grill on wooden platter.
Rakott krumpli			A layered potato casserole with sausage, eggs, and bacon.
Rántott csirke			A chicken breast rolled in breadcrumbs and deep-fried; similar to Wiener Schnitzel. Another rarer dish, rántott galamb, is made the same way, except with pigeon.
Rántott hús			Originally from Austria. The meat is tenderized, covered in eggs, flour, and breadcrumbs, then fried. Also known as Wiener schnitzel.
Rakott káposzta (Kolozsvári káposzta)			A layered cabbage dish which consists of cabbage, pörkölt, rice, sour cream, and spices. The dish comes from the Hungarians in Transylvania (Erdélyi).
Rántott sajt			A flat cheese croquette, rolled in breadcrumbs and deep-fried.
Stefánia szelet			A loaf of ground meat or Stefania slices (Hungarian meatloaf with hard boiled eggs in the middle, which makes decorative white and yellow rings in the middle of the slices.
Szűztekercsek			A pork tenderloin filled with spicy tomato puree, spinach, etc.
Szűzpecsenye			Literally means virgin roast and the pork tenderloins, which are usually prepared the same as above. May also be made into szűzérme (lit. virgin medallions; pork medallions) or szűztekercs (rouladen; thinly-cut tenderloins, stuffed with minced meat, vegetables and other things).
Töltött paprika Punjena paprika			A dish made of stuffed peppers, with a mix of meat and rice in tomato sauce, the ingredients consisting of green or red capsicums, eggs, spices, salt, tomato, minced meat, and rice.
Túrós csusza			A traditional Hungarian savory quark cheese noodle dish made with small home-made noodles or pasta, which is called galuska.
Vesepecsenye			Beef tenderloins, usually seasoned with paprika and salt.

== Dumplings and others ==
Name	Image	Region	Description
Császármorzsa			Shredded, sweet crêpe pieces with sugar sprinkled on top. Often served with jam (apricot or peach, usually) as well.
Diós tészta			Boiled egg noodle dish served with ground walnuts and sugar, often with lekvár (jam) or honey.
Galuska			Hungarian boiled dumplings used in soups and stews.
Grízgaluska			Hungarian boiled semolina dumplings used in a soup.
Körözött; Liptai túró			A spicy spread made from fresh white cheese mixed with sweet paprika and onions.
Liptai túró			A spicy cheese spread with paprika, carraway, and onions.
Libamájpástétom			A luxury food pâté made of the liver of a duck or goose that has been specially fattened.
Gránátos kocka			A home-cooked, simple egg noodle dish, made with potatoes and paprika powder. Often served with pickled gherkins or other pickled vegetables on the side.
Májgaluska leves			Small liver dumplings used in different soups, as in a liver ball soup.
Mákos tészta			Very famous and common, an easy egg noodle dish, made with ground and sweetened poppy seeds. It has a distinct look and taste.
Padlizsánkrém; Vinetta			A Transylvanian mashed eggplant salad made of grilled, peeled, and finely chopped eggplants.
Pásztortarhonya			Literally translates as shepherd egg barley. A hearty dish consisting of egg barley, potatoes, onion, kolbász, and paprika, sometimes also with bacon and other vegetables.
Rizi-bizi			A Hungarian risotto, which is white rice mixed with green peas, served as a side dish.
Szilvásgombóc; Plum Dumplings			Szilvásgombóc and Nudli, which are sweet plum dumplings and small noodles, rolled in sweet fried breadcrumbs or streusels.
Tarhonyás hús Egg barley			A kind of large Hungarian "couscous", which is a big pasta grain, served as a side dish.
Töltött káposzta			A cabbage roll made from pickled cabbage, filled with a light minced pork meat and rice mix. It may contain minced paprika and be served in a tomato sauce with sour cream, but this is not always the case (as in the picture). It is frequently eaten around Christmas and New Year's, but can still be eaten year-round.
Töltött tojás			A hard-boiled egg that has been shelled, cut in half, and filled with a paste made from an egg yolk mixed with other ingredients such as mayonnaise and mustard.
Túrógombóc			Hungarian sweet quark cheese dumplings that are served as a side dish.
Vinetta			Transylvanian mashed eggplant salad made of grilled, peeled and finely chopped eggplants.

== Breads and pancakes ==
Name	Image	Region	Description
Bundás kenyér French toast			Literally "bread with a fur jacket", a savoury French toast or Gypsy toast or bread fritter, a breakfast food or sometimes as a side dish.
Császármorzsa			A shredded pancake, which has its name from the Austrian emperor (Kaiser) Franz Joseph I, who was very fond of this kind of fluffy shredded pancake.
Csúsztatott palacsinta			Layered crêpes with sweet cottage cheese, raisins, jam, and walnuts, similar to the Mille crêpe.
Gundel palacsinta		Hungary	Literally named Gundel crêpe. It was created by and named after Hungarian restaurateur Károly Gundel. They are stuffed with walnuts and served in chocolate sauce, and often flambéed (with rum). They traditionally also come with candied orange peels.
Hortobágyi palacsinta		Alföld	A savoury Hungarian pancake, filled with meat (usually veal) as the meat is prepared as a stew and the minced meat is fried with onions and spices, like the pörkölt or the paprikás dish, using veal, with or without mushrooms, chicken, or Hungarian sausages.
Kenyér			A Hungarian bread that tends to be big, round, and with a hard and thick crust.
Kifli			A traditional European yeast roll made into a crescent shape, which can be either salty or sweet.
Lángos			Fried bread dough, often served with sour cream, garlic, and cheese.
Palacsinta			A stuffed crêpe, usually filled with jam. Other fillings that exist are sweet quark cheese (túró) with raisins, Nutella, vanilla pudding, or meat. Some more specific/elaborate variations on the palacsinta are listed in the next few rows.
Perec			A type of Hungarian baked pretzel made from dough most commonly shaped into a twisted knot.
Pogácsa			A type of bun, round puffed pastry, available with bacon or cheese, traditionally cooked on the fire.
Rakott palacsinta			Layered crêpes with sweet cottage cheese, raisins, jam, and walnuts.
Vekni			The other freshly baked bread type that consists of a long loaf with a crispy crust, either thicker or thinner, like the baguette.
Zsemle; Bread rolls			Round small breads, eaten as cut in half, with butter, cold cuts, or jam, often for breakfast.

== Sweets and cakes ==
Name	Image	Region	Description
Aranygaluska			Baked dough balls with butter, raisins and nuts, often served with vanilla custard.
Babapiskóta			Low density, dry, egg-based, sweet sponge biscuits roughly shaped like a large finger.
Bejgli			A cake roll eaten at Christmas and Easter.
Birsalmasajt; Quince cheese			A quince cheese, or quince jelly made of quinces.
Csiga			Literally "snail" - a rolled pastry that comes in many different coatings and flavors, usually walnut, poppy seed, chocolate, and vanilla pudding.
Csöröge fánk			Crispy and light Hungarian Angel Wings; a twisted thin fried cookie made of yeast dough, dusted with powdered sugar.
Dobostorta; Dobos cake			A sponge cake layered with chocolate paste and glazed with caramel and nuts.
Eszterházy torta			A Hungarian cake (torta), named after Prince Paul III Anton Esterházy de Galántha (1786–1866), a member of the Esterházy dynasty and diplomat of the Austrian Empire.
Fánk; Bismarck doughnuts			A traditional Hungarian pastry, similar to a doughnut with no central hole, but it has a round, sweet, and fired taste, topped with lekvar.
Flódni		Jewish-Hungarian	A cake with four different fillings, which are poppy seed, walnut, apple, and plum jam.
Gesztenyepüré			Cooked and mashed sweet chestnuts with sugar and rum, topped with whipped cream.
Halva, Transylvanian sweet			A sweet confection, made with sunflower seeds, of Turkish origin.
Képviselőfánk			Hungarian Cream Puff made from choux pastry and filled with vanilla cream. Literal translation - 'Ambassador Doughnut'.
Krémes			A puff pastry top, custard cream and whipped cream filling, and is finished with powdered sugar.
Kuglóf			A traditional Austro-Hungarian coffee party cake, traditionally baked in a distinctive circular Bundt mold.
Kürtőskalács			A spit cake specific to Hungary and Hungarian-speaking regions in Transylvania, more predominantly the Székely Land.
Lekvár			A very thick, sometimes coarse jam of pure ripe fruit originating in central and eastern Europe.
Lekváros bukta			A baked dessert filled with jam, túró, or ground walnuts.
Lekváros tekercs Swiss roll			A rolled up soft sponge cake filled with jam.
Linzer Torte			A tart with a crisscross design of pastry strips on top.
Madártej			A floating island dessert, made of milk custard with egg white dumplings floating on top.
Mákos guba		Silesia	Kifli and finely ground poppy seeds boiled in milk and sugar.
Mézes krémes			A Hungarian honey cake that is covered with vanilla or chocolate.
Piskóta			A thin, light, sweet, delicate, and crispy cookie.
Rétes			A type of layered pastry with a filling that is usually sweet.
Rigó Jancsi			A cube-shaped sponge cake with dark chocolate glaze.
Somlói galuska		Budapest/Fót	A sponge cake with raisins, walnuts, served with rum, chocolate sauce, and whipped cream.
Szaloncukor			Flavoured candies which hang on the Christmas tree, eaten at Christmas.
Törökméz; Nougat			A sweet sticky white nougat paste cooked with sugar, egg whites, honey, bits of walnuts, spread between two wafer sheets.
Túrós lepény			Dessert bars made from sweetened túró. A variant called kapros-túrós lepény also exists, which has added dill.
Túró Rudi			A sweet quark cheese that is called a "túró"-filled chocolate bar.
Vaníliás kifli			Small and crescent-shaped biscuits, that are originally made with walnuts, but also with almonds or hazelnuts. They get their typical flavor from a heavy dusting of vanilla sugar.
Vargabéles			Hungarian strudel or noodle pie.

== See also ==
- List of restaurants in Hungary
- Hungarian cuisine
