= Brassó =

Brassó may refer to:

- Brassó, the Hungarian name for Brașov, present-day Romania
  - Brassói aprópecsenye, Hungarian dish
- Brassó County, a county of the Kingdom of Hungary from 1876 to 1920 with the above city as county seat
- Brassó, the Hungarian name for Brăşeu village, Zam Commune, Hunedoara County, Romania

== See also ==
- Brasso, a metal polish designed to remove tarnish from brass, copper, chrome and stainless steel
