= Viktor Janka =

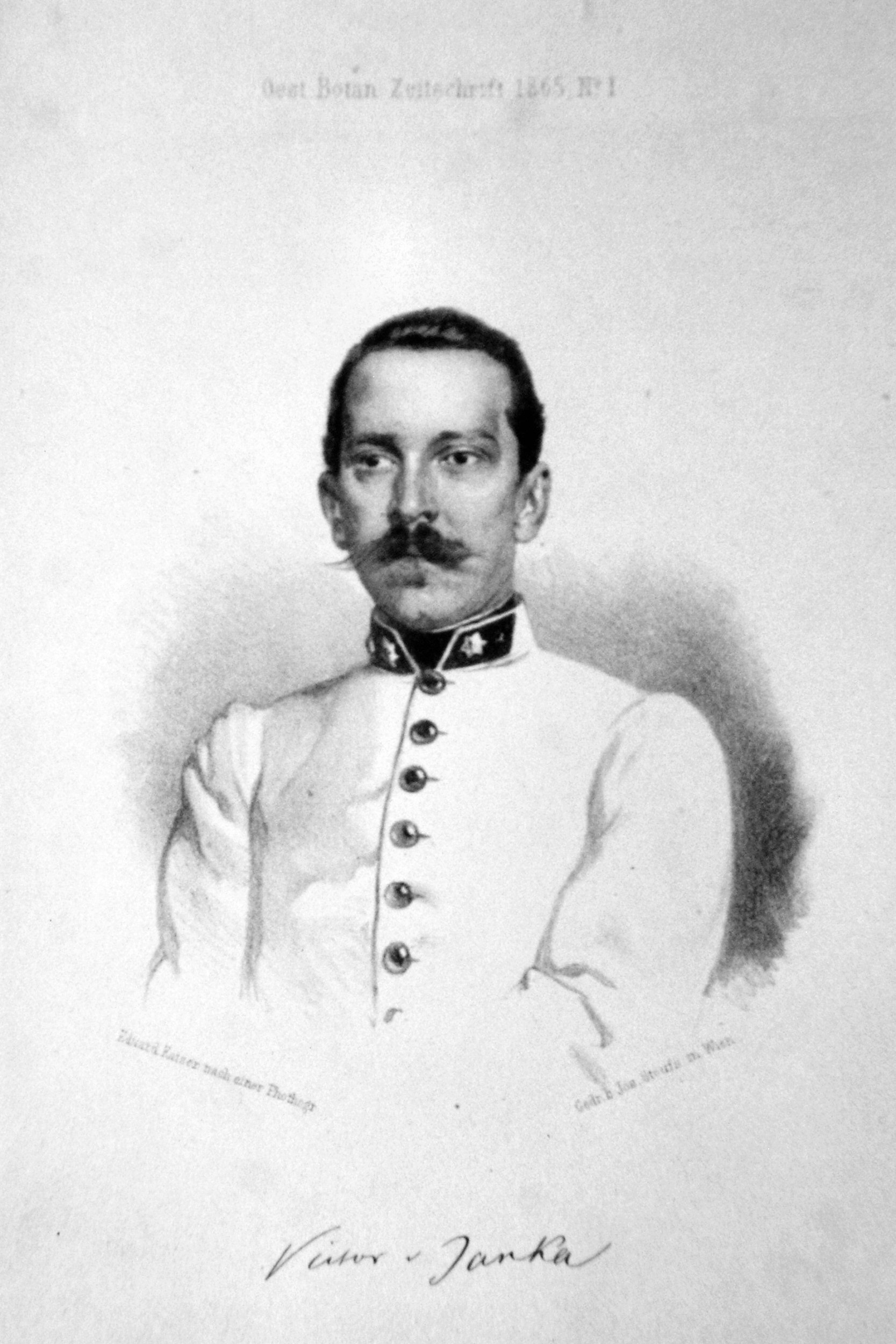
Viktor Janka

Viktor Janka von Bulcs, often shortened to Viktor Janka (24 December 1837 in Vienna - 9 August 1890 in Budapest) was an Austrian military officer and botanist. He worked as the officer of a Cuirassier regiment (armoured cavalry soldiers) for the Imperial Austrian Army until 1870. He was then named curator of the botanical department of the Budapest National Museum. He ceased working for the museum in 1889 and died one year later in the same city. Janka had collected many botanical specimens throughout the Austro-Hungarian Empire and his types are housed in the herbarium of the Babeș-Bolyai University in Romania.

He discovered and described several plant species, including the Hungarian crocus (Colchicum hungaricum).

The standard author abbreviation Janka is used to indicate this person as the author when citing a botanical name.

The monotypic relict genus Jankaea, the orchid species Himantoglossum jankae and Chamaecytisus jankae are named after him.
