= Shlishkes =

Hungarian Jewish dumplings

- Alternative names: Krumplinudli, nudli
- Type: Dumpling
- Place of origin: Originally Hungarian Jewish community, today mainly the United States, also Israel
- Created by: Ashkenazi Jews
- Main ingredients: Mashed potatoes, eggs, flour, water, streusel

Shlishkes (the plural form is standard) is a potato-based small dumpling of Hungarian Jewish origin, and are a popular part of the Jewish cuisine of the Ashkenazi community. They can be sweet or savory.

== Overview ==
It is formed from a soft dough of cooked mashed potatoes, egg, flour and water; the dumplings are boiled and rolled in sugar and hot buttered caramelized breadcrumbs (streusel), or in browned breadcrumbs as a savory preparation. The dough is first rolled into a rope, and then cut into pieces, which are then twisted, before boiling. It can also be filled with prune lekvar or with a sweet poppy seed filling; this version is commonly eaten during Hanukkah, alongside latkes and sufganiyot.

The dish is a version of Kartoffelklösse, and is comparable to gnocchi, but is firmer and lacks ridges. There is a baked or pan-fried variant of it called bilkas or bilkhalekh. It can include sauteed onions, and during Passover, matzah cake meal is used instead of flour.

== History ==
Shlishkes began as a way for using remaining potato dough from making gombóc. It became a Friday-night treat amongst some Hungarians during the 1800s, and during the 1930s, it became popular amongst eastern European Jews in Brooklyn and Queens as a side dish on Friday nights and during holidays; the dish can still be found in Kosher stores and at some weddings and bar mitzvahs in New York today.

== Etymology ==
The name "shlishkes" comes from the German word schulterstuck, which means "twisted knot", because the dumplings are twisted while being made.

== See also ==
- Gnocchi
- Schupfnudel
- Matzo ball
- Kreplach
