= Fatányéros =

Traditional Hungarian mixed meat barbecue dish

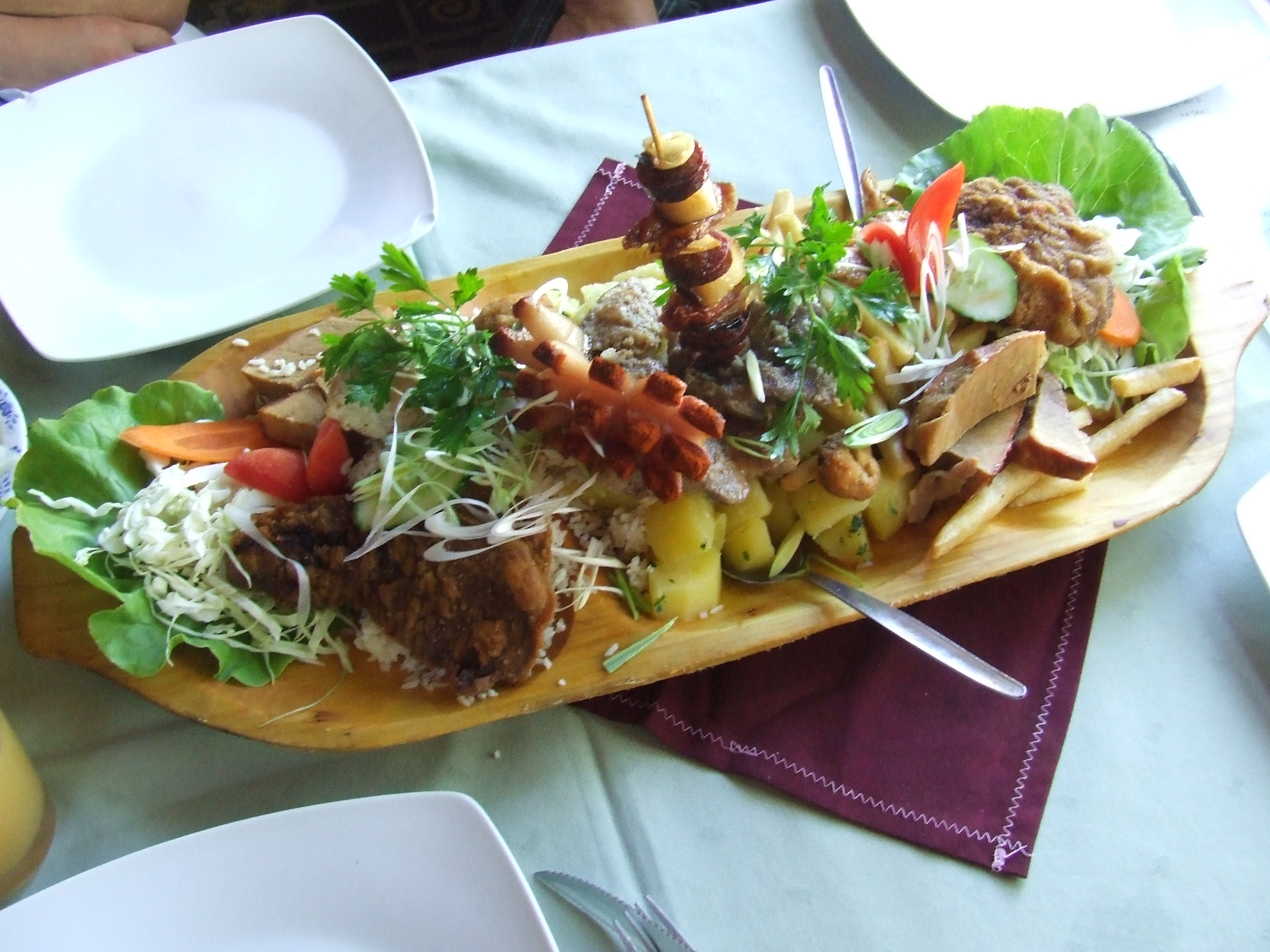
Fatányéros, as served in Hungary.

Fatányéros, also called Hungarian mixed grill, is a traditional Hungarian mixed meat barbecue dish (or pecsenye in Hungarian), that emerged in Transylvania.

Similar dishes are found throughout the cuisines of the Balkans, including Grătar mixt in Romanian cuisine, meshana skara in Bulgarian cuisine, and mešano meso in the cuisines of the former Yugoslavia.

== Components ==
The dish Fatányéros was on the menu since 1900 at the famous restaurant Wampetich (later Gundel) in the City Park (Városliget) in Budapest, as "fatányéros—Hungarian mixed grill on wooden platter". The dish was served on wooden platter, and contained grilled slices of veal, beef, pork cutlets, and a slice of goose liver and a slice of bacon—grilled or roasted on a spit. As a side dish french fries or thick slices of fried potatoes are served, together with fresh mixed green salad, with a big knife with Hungarian motives stuck in the middle of the steak.

Steaks called pecsenye (cf. Serbo-Croatian: pečenje) are part of the traditional Hungarian cuisine and may refer to any kind of pan fried meat: pork, beef, poultry or game. These steaks are often served on a wooden platter, like Bakonyi pecsenye, Cigánypecsenye, Tordai pecsenye or Erdélyi fatányéros, arranged in a very decorative way with garnishing, fried vegetables and salad.

== See also ==
- Romani cuisine
