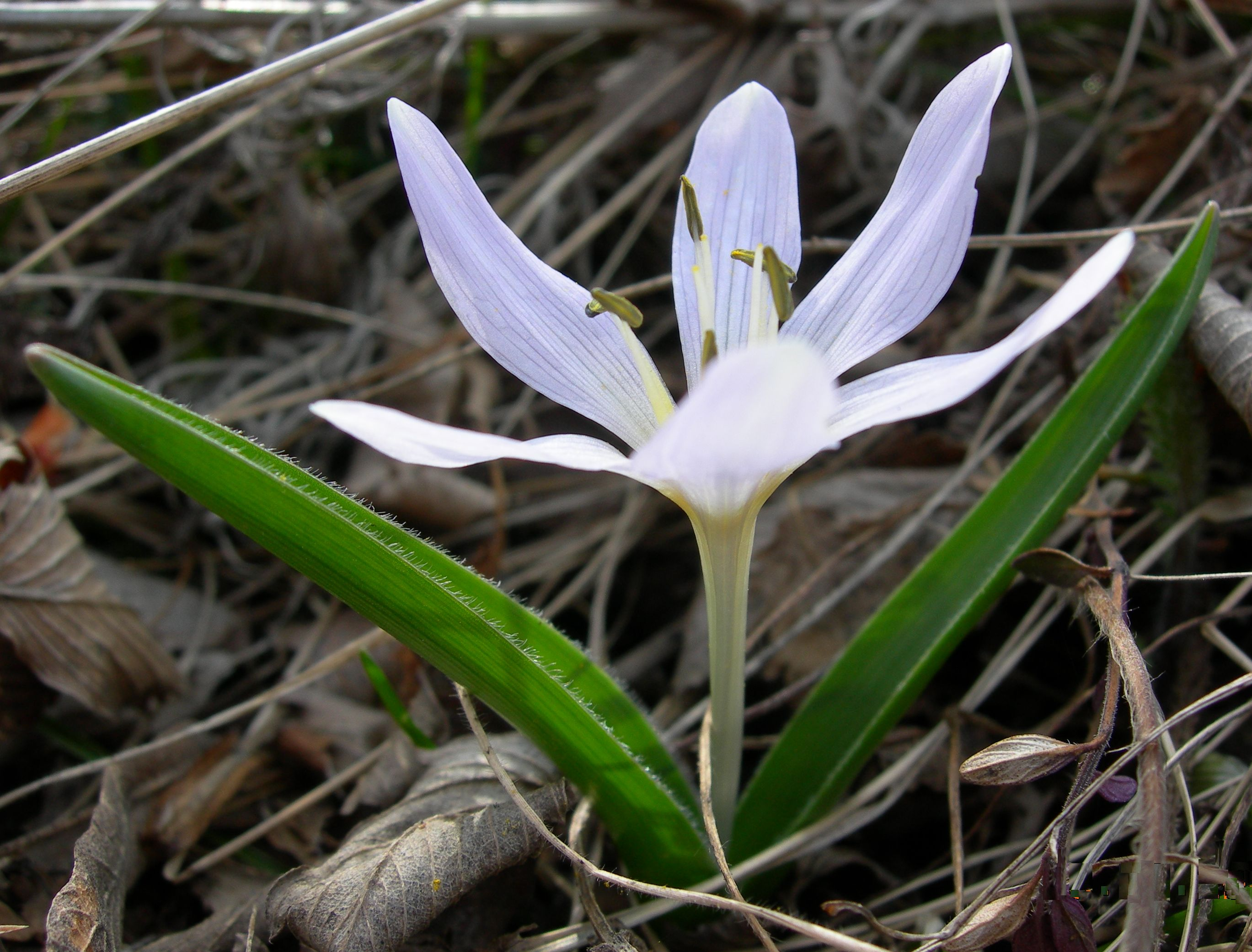

Scientific classification
- Kingdom: Plantae
- Clade: Tracheophytes
- Clade: Angiosperms
- Clade: Monocots
- Order: Liliales
- Family: Colchicaceae
- Genus: Colchicum
- Species: C. hungaricum

Binomial name
- Colchicum hungaricum Janka

Synonyms
- Colchicum bulbocodioides subsp. hungaricum Janka; Colchicum hungaricum f. albiflorum K.Maly; Colchicum montanum var. croaticum A.Grove

= Colchicum hungaricum =

Species of flowering plant

Colchicum hungaricum, commonly known as the Hungarian crocus, is a species of flowering plant in the genus Colchicum. It is distinguished by its white to pinkish-lilac flowers that emerge in very early spring.

== Distribution and habitat ==
Although C. hungaricum is known from several countries of the Balkan Peninsula—including Croatia, Bosnia and Herzegovina, Albania, Bulgaria and Greece—the Hungarian population represents the species’ northernmost and most isolated occurrence. In Hungary, it is confined to a single locality on Szársomlyó Hill (also known as Harsányi Hill) in the Villány Mountains. This area is characterised by a karst limestone grassland and bushy steppe habitat, where a warm, south-facing microclimate prevails. The shallow Rendzina soils of the slope heat rapidly, creating conditions that support Mediterranean and sub-Mediterranean elements within the flora.

Although early botanical work suggested that the species was endemic to Hungary, subsequent surveys have confirmed its presence throughout the Balkan Peninsula. The Hungarian population is now regarded as a relict—a surviving remnant of a warmer climatic period. Some botanists posit that it may date back to the Riss and Würm glaciations, while others suggest a Tertiary origin, thus rendering it one of the last vestiges of the subtropical vegetation that once dominated the region.

== Ecology ==
Recent research has shed light on an intriguing ecological association involving C. hungaricum. Studies conducted in Hungary have documented that the plant serves as a food source for the moth Cnephasia chrysantheana. Larvae have been observed feeding on both the leaves and the flowers of the plant, thereby expanding the known range of host plants for this tortricid moth and offering new insights into its bionomics.

== Conservation ==
Colchicum hungaricum has been afforded legal protection in Hungary since 1979, and each specimen is attributed a high conservation value. The species is also listed among the endangered elements of the Hungarian flora. The sole Hungarian locality is situated within a strictly regulated natural area—accessible only with a permit—to safeguard the habitat from threats such as limestone mining and other forms of habitat degradation.

== Taxonomy ==
The species was first described in 1886 by the Hungarian botanist Viktor Janka after his discovery on the southern slopes of the Villány Mountains in Hungary. The epithet hungaricum was originally chosen to highlight the plant's discovery in Hungary.
