= Brassói aprópecsenye =

Hungarian dish

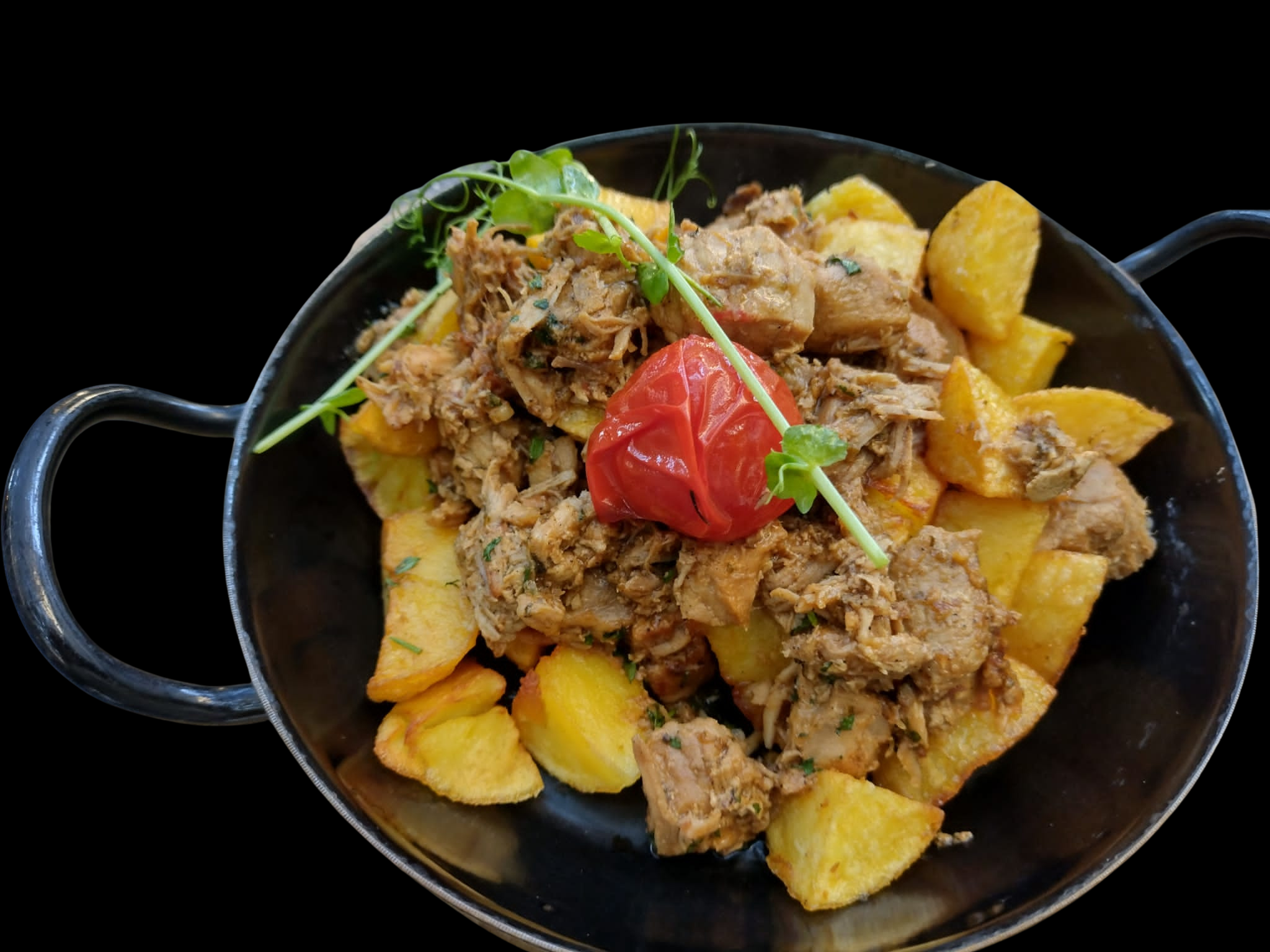
- Brassói aprópecsenye
- Course: Main dish
- Place of origin: Hungary
- Main ingredients: Pork, potatoes, seasoning (garlic, onion, paprika, oil, salt, pepper)

Brassói aprópecsenye (translated as "tiny roasts from Brașov") is a Hungarian dish. It is a hot dish made from pork and seasoned potatoes, which can include garlic, onion, paprika, oil, salt, and pepper, although there are several variations. The origin of the dish is not clearly established, but it is believed to date back to the 19th or 20th century.

== Origin ==
The recipe for brassói aprópecsenye is sometimes attributed to Nándor Gróf, the head chef of the Hungarian State Railways, who is said to have created the recipe in 1948 on a train traveling between Budapest and Brașov. This theory is disputed by chef György Dózsa, who indicates that the recipe is first described in a 19th-century cookbook and defines it as a dish originating from Brașov and consisting of beef and garlic. Endre Papp, the former director of Mátyás Cellar in Vienna, claims that he first prepared this dish for a culinary innovation competition on September 17, 1950. Residents of Óbuda, a district of Budapest, claim that the recipe was created by the wife of the owner of the Weiss Pub (located in Óbuda) for the anniversary of the master carpenter Károly Brassóy; the dish prepared is made with pork, marjoram, onion, and tarhonya.

Due to its uncertain origin, even though its name refers to the city of Brașov, the dish may not have a direct connection to that city but may have acquired the name to make it more traditional. Furthermore, the prefix "apró-" meaning "tiny" is said to have been added sarcastically to the Hungarian name when someone accidentally cut the meat into too small pieces.

== Preparation ==
The dish begins with meat cut into small cubes, browned in a large pan with oil, and seasoned with salt, pepper, garlic, and marjoram. Broth is added and the mixture sautéed. Potatoes are peeled and cubed to match the meat's size, then fried until golden and drained. The heat is raised under the pork until it is uniformly golden, and paprika is briefly stir-fried. The potatoes are combined with the meat to warm them. The dish is served warm with a garnish of chopped parsley.
