= Austrian cuisine =

Culinary traditions of Austria

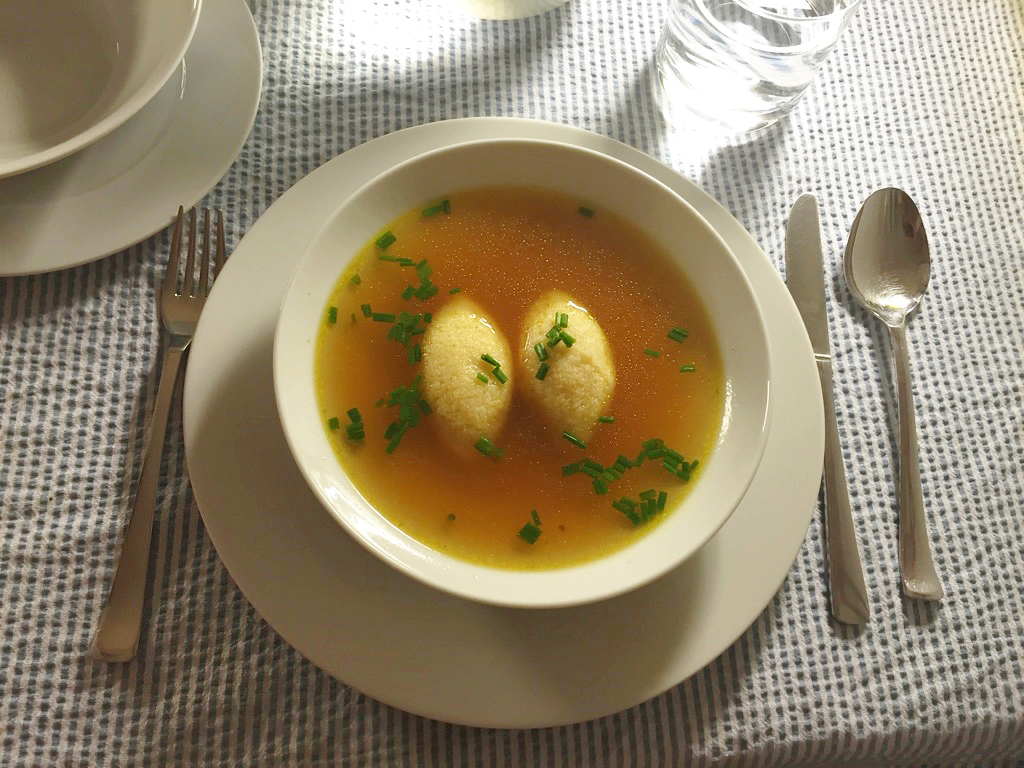
Grießnockerlsuppe

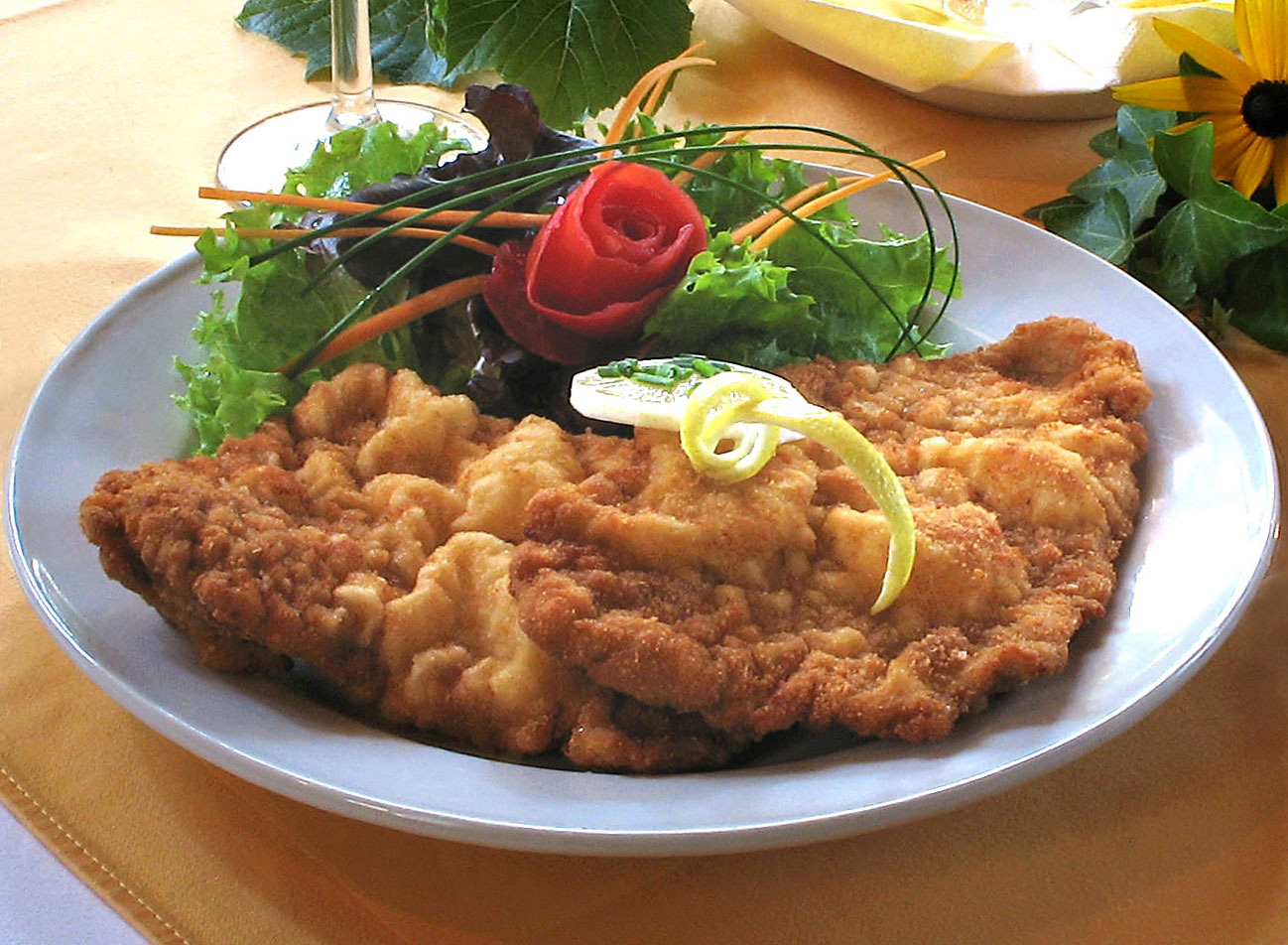
Wiener schnitzel

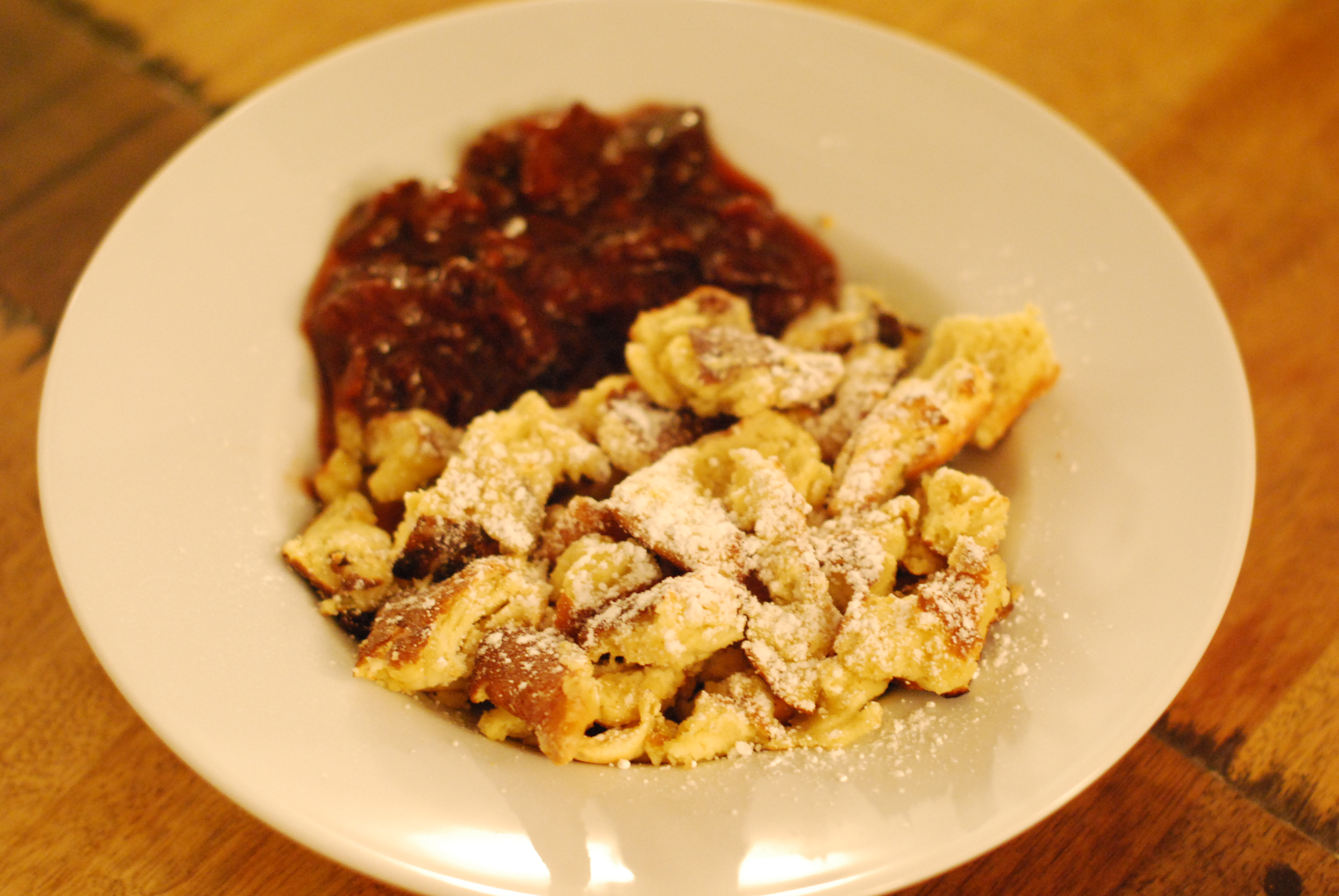
Kaiserschmarrn

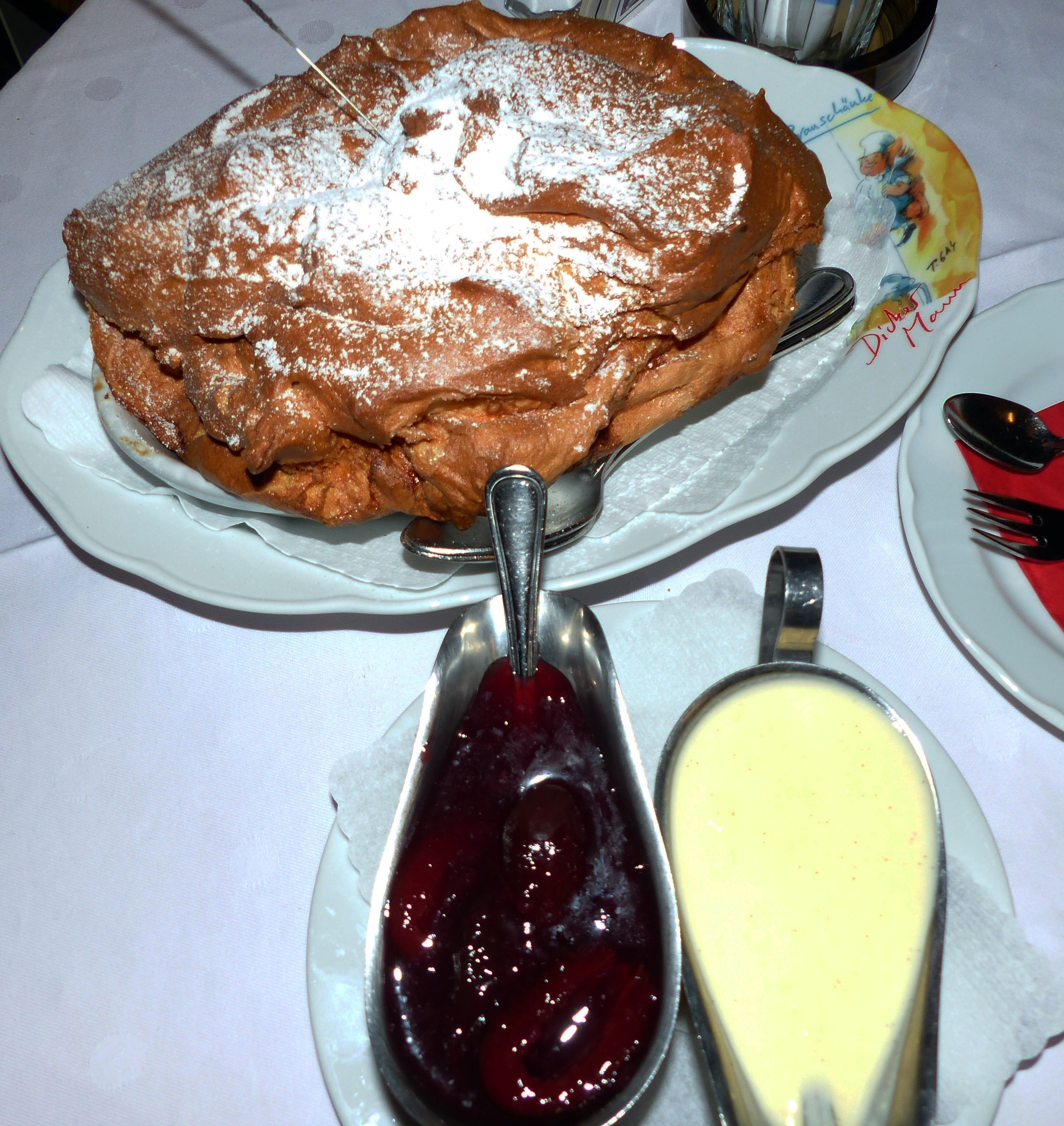
Salzburger Nockerl

Austrian cuisine consists of many different local or regional cuisines. In addition to Viennese cuisine, which is predominantly based on the cooking traditions of the Habsburg Empire, there are independent regional traditions in all the states of Austria.

The Austrian cuisine shares similarities with its neighboring countries in Central Europe, but particularly with the cuisines of Hungary (with which it was aligned as part of the Austro-Hungarian Empire), Bavaria, Bohemia and Northern Italy. Internationally, it is particularly well-known for its pastries, such as Kaiserschmarrn and apple strudel, and for meat-based dishes such as the Wiener schnitzel.

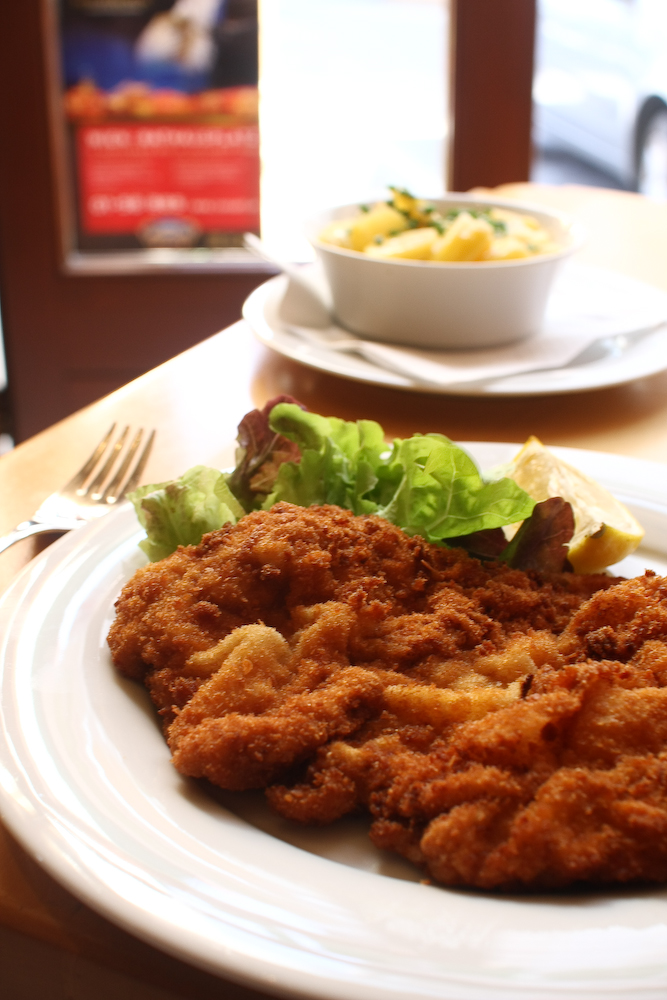
Wiener schnitzel, a traditional Austrian dish made with boneless meat thinned with a mallet (escalope-style preparation), and fried with a coating of flour, egg, and breadcrumbs

== Mealtimes ==
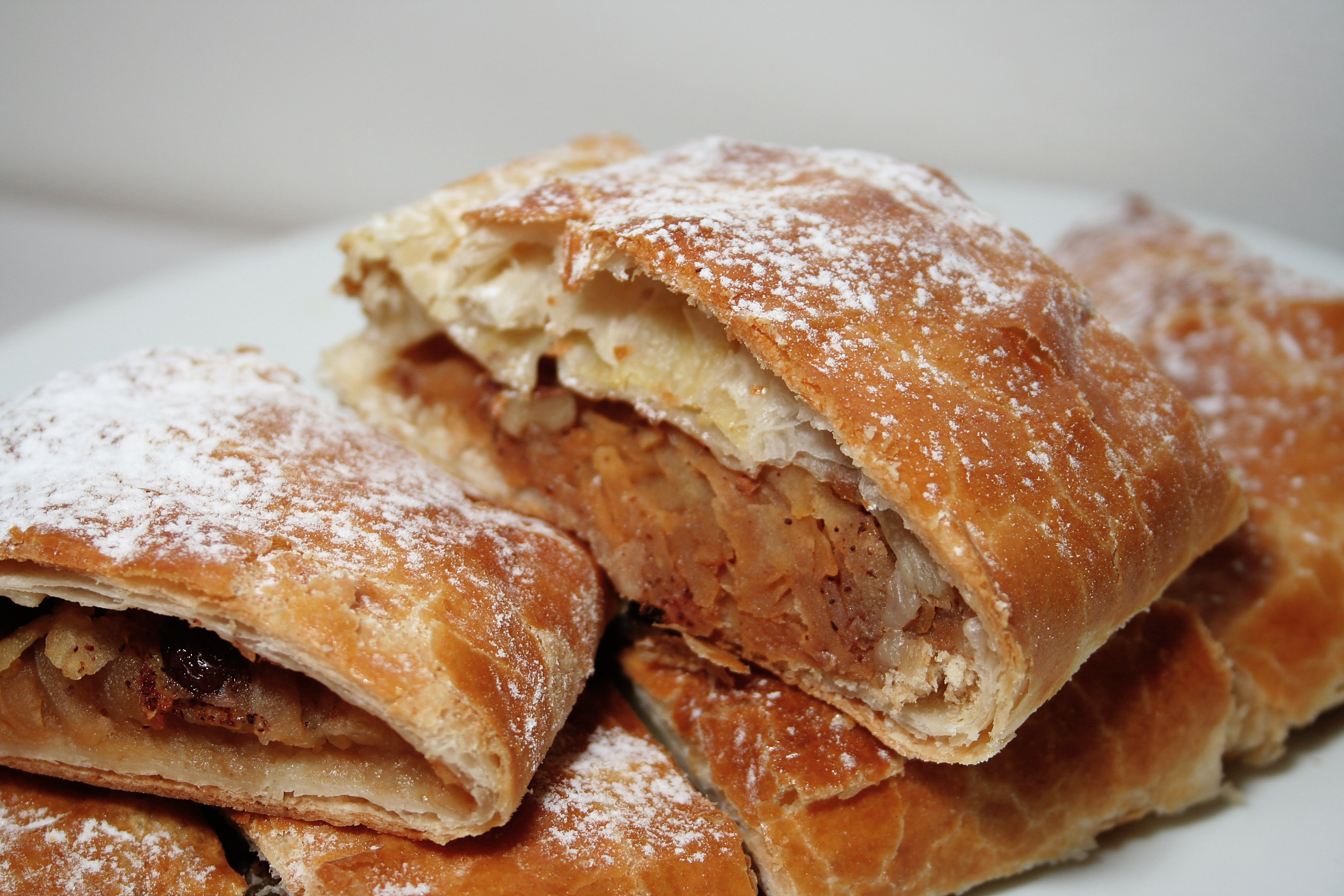
Apfelstrudel

Breakfast is of the "continental" type, usually consisting of bread rolls with either jam or cold meats and cheese, accompanied by coffee, tea or juice. The midday meal was traditionally the main meal of the day, but in modern times, as Austrians work longer hours further from home, this is no longer the case. The main meal is now often eaten in the evening.

A mid-morning or mid-afternoon snack of a slice of bread topped with cheese or ham is referred to as a Jause; a more substantial version akin to a British "ploughman's lunch" is called a Brettljause after the wooden board on which it is traditionally served.

=== Popular dishes of Vienna ===
- Rindsuppe (beef soup), a clear soup with golden colour
- Tafelspitz, beef boiled in broth (soup), often served with apple and horseradish and chives sauce
- Gulasch (goulash), a hotpot similar to Hungarian pörkölt. Austrian goulash is often eaten with rolls, bread or dumplings (Semmelknödel).
- Beuschel, a ragout containing lungs and heart
- Liptauer, a spicy cheese spread, eaten on a slice of bread
- Selchfleisch, meat that is smoked, then cooked, served with Sauerkraut and dumplings
- Powidl, a thick sweet jam made from plums
- Apfelstrudel, apple strudel
- Topfenstrudel, cream cheese strudel
- Millirahmstrudel, milk-cream strudel
- Palatschinken, pancakes similar to French crêpes, filled with jam and sprinkled with sugar or other toppings. They are also served in savoury versions, such as with spinach and cheese.
- Kaiserschmarrn, soft, fluffy pancake ripped into bites and slightly roasted in a pan, served with compote, applesauce or stewed plums.
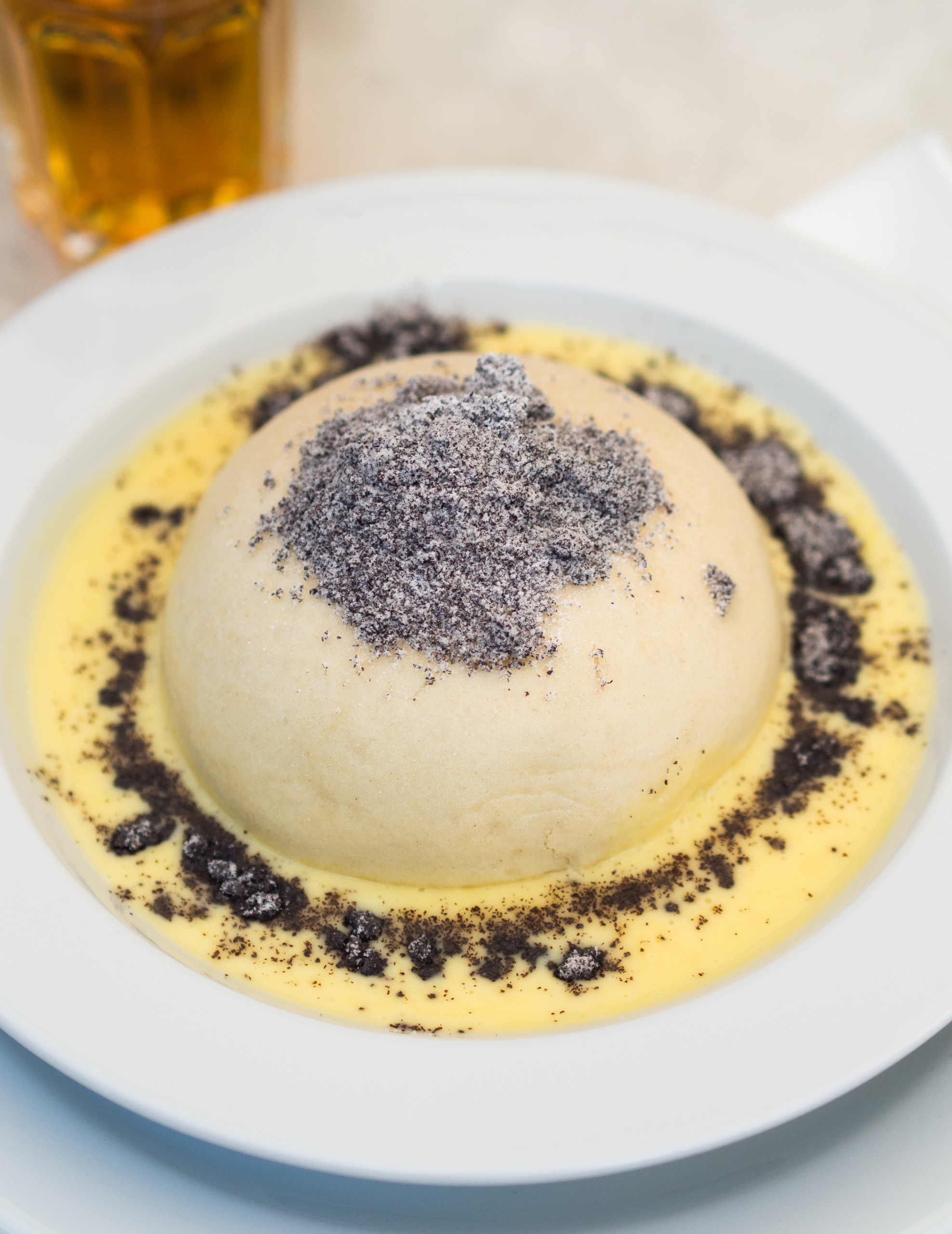
- Germknödel
  Germknödel, a fluffy yeast dough dumpling filled with plum jam (Powidl), garnished with melted butter and a mix of poppy seeds and powdered sugar, sometimes served with vanilla cream
- Marillenknödel, a dumpling stuffed with an apricot and covered with streusel and powdered sugar. The dough is made of potatoes or Topfen.
- Saftgulasch (juicy stew), also known as Austrian or Viennese goulash, is an Austrian variant of the traditional Hungarian dish. Saftgulash is prepared exclusively with lean beef and a large quantity of onions, at least two-thirds of the quantity of meat used. No other vegetables are added and it must be slow-cooked for at least three hours. The result is a thick dark brown sauce with very tender pieces of beef.
- Wurstsemmel (ham rolls), sliced bread rolls containing a slice of ham, or sausage (Leberkäse), or ham and cheese
- Krautfleisch or Szegediner Krautfleisch, a ragout prepared from pork and Sauerkraut.
- Krautspatzle, a dish consisting mainly of small noodles (spätzle) and cabbage.
- Stelze,

== Meat ==
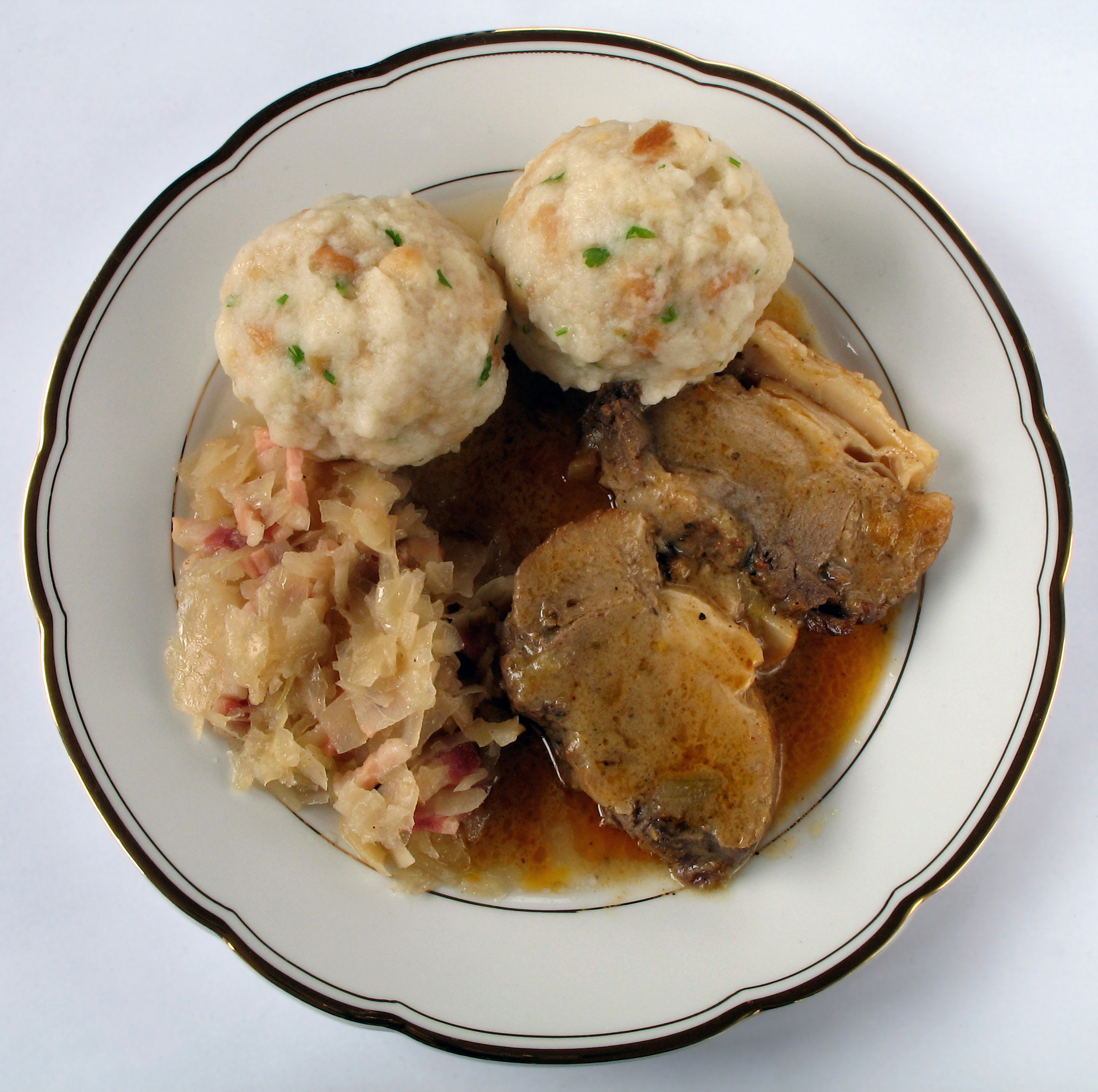
Schweinsbraten (roast pork) with Semmelknödel dumplings and cabbage salad

The most popular meats in Austria are beef, pork, chicken, turkey and goose. The prominent Wiener schnitzel is traditionally made of veal. Pork in particular is used extensively, with many dishes using offal and parts such as the snout and trotters.

Austrian butchers use a number of special cuts of meat, including Tafelspitz (beef), and Fledermaus (pork). Fledermaus (German for 'bat') is a cut of pork from the ham bone that resembles the winged animal. It is described as "very juicy, somewhat fatty, and crossed by tendons"; the latter makes it suitable for steaming, braising or frying after tenderization in a marinade.

Austrian cuisine has many different sausages, like Frankfurter, Käsekrainer, Debreziner (originating from Debrecen in Hungary), Burenwurst, Blunzn (made with pig blood) and Grüne Würstl (green sausages). Green means raw in this context—the sausages are air-dried and are consumed boiled. Bacon in Austria is called Speck, and can be smoked, raw, salted, or spiced, among other preparations. Bacon is used in many traditional recipes as a salty spice. Leberkäse is a loaf of corned beef, pork and bacon; it contains neither liver nor cheese despite the name. Vanillerostbraten is a garlicky beef dish.

=== Game ===
Austria has an old hunting tradition since there are many woods across the country. In the autumn season many restaurants in Austria traditionally offer game on their menus, along with seasonal vegetables and fruits like pumpkins from Styria. Typical game are:

- Deer (venison): Hirsch
- Wild boar: Wildschwein
- Roe deer: Reh
- Fallow deer: Damhirsch
- Brown hare: Hase/Feldhase
- Common pheasant: Fasan
- Duck: Ente
- Grey partridge: Rebhuhn

The German names of game animals followed by -braten signifies a dish of roast game: for example, Hirschbraten is roast venison.

== Sweets ==
=== Cakes ===
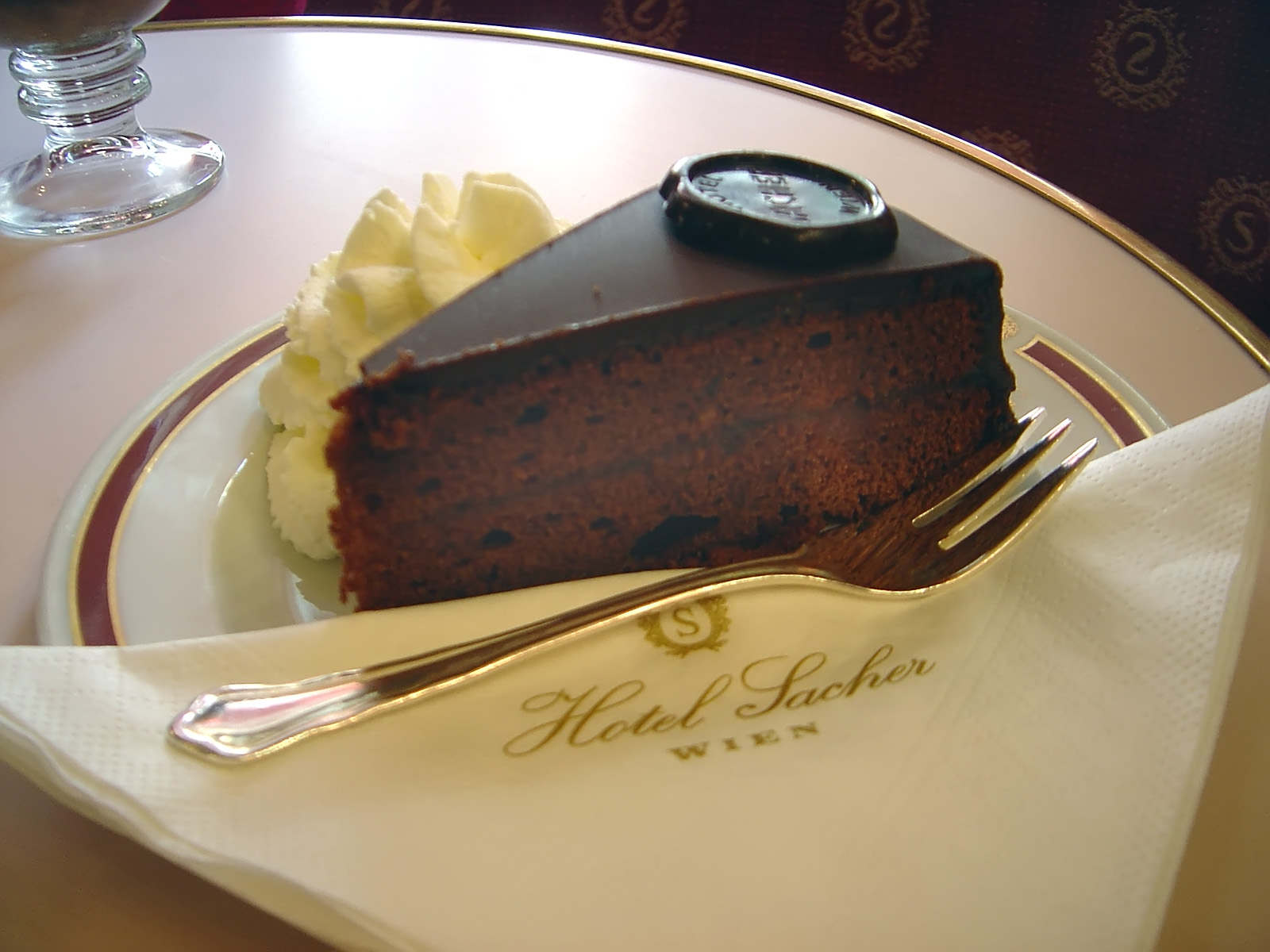
The original Sachertorte, as served at Vienna's Hotel Sacher

Austrian cakes and pastries are a well-known feature of its cuisine. Perhaps the most famous is the Sachertorte, a chocolate cake with apricot jam filling, traditionally eaten with whipped cream. Among the cakes with the longest tradition is the Linzertorte. Other favourites include the caramel-flavoured Dobostorte and the delicately layered Esterhazy torte, named in honour of Prince Esterházy (both originating from Hungary during the Austro-Hungarian empire), as well as a number of cakes made with fresh fruit and cream. Punschkrapfen is a classical Austrian pastry, a cake filled with cake crumbs, nougat chocolate, apricot jam and then soaked with rum. Tirolerkuchen is a hazelnut and chocolate coffee cake. Mohr im Hemd, while traditionally something closer to a chocolate custard, is now generally prepared as a steamed cake.

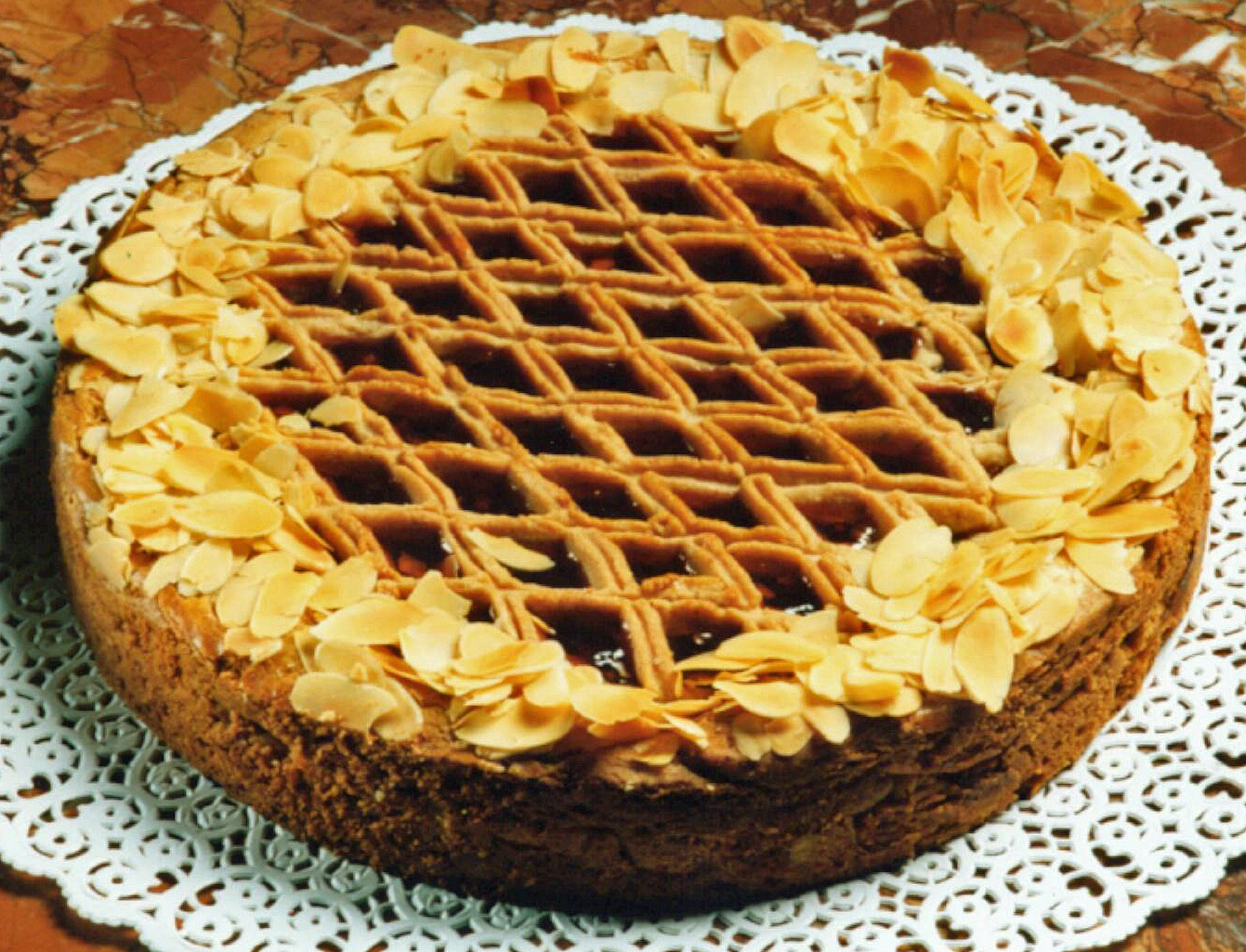
Linzertorte

These cakes are typically complex and difficult to make. They can be eaten at a café or bought by the slice from a bakery. A "Konditorei" is a specialist cake-maker, and the designations "Café-Konditorei" and "Bäckerei-Konditorei" are common indicators that the café or bakery in question specialises in this field.

=== Desserts ===
Austrian desserts are usually slightly less complicated than the elaborate cakes described above. The most famous of these is the Apfelstrudel (apple strudel), layers of thin pastry surrounding a filling of apple, usually with cinnamon and raisins. Other strudels are also popular, such as those filled with sweetened curd cheese called Topfen, sour cherry (Weichselstrudel), and sweet cherry and poppy seed (Mohnstrudel).

Another favourite is Kaiserschmarr'n, a rich fluffy sweet thick pancake made with raisins and other fruits, broken into pieces and served with a fruit compote (traditionally made of plums called Zwetschkenröster (German: [ˈt͡svɛt͡ʃkn̩ˌʁœstɐ])) for dipping, while a speciality of Salzburg is the meringue-like "Salzburger Nocken". The Danish pastry is said to originate from Vienna and in Denmark is called wienerbrød (Viennese bread). The Danish pastry uses a dough in the classic cuisine referred to as "Viennese dough", made of thin layers of butter and flour dough, imported to Denmark by Austrian bakers hired during a strike among the workers in Danish bakeries in 1850.

Viennese nougat is a softer form of the brown kind of nougat common in Central and Northern Europe. As "Wiener nougat", a form of it—now made with palm oil instead of the original cocoa butter—is mass-produced by the confectionery company Fazer in Finland, where it has become a common Christmas treat.

== Drinks ==
=== Coffee ===
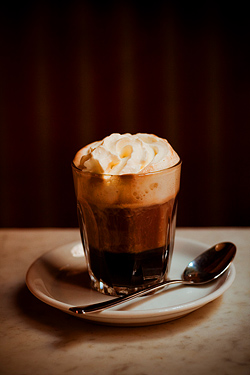
An Einspänner is classically served in a glass.

Austria is credited in popular legend with introducing coffee to Europe after bags of coffee beans were left behind by the retreating Turkish army after the Battle of Vienna in 1683. Although the first coffeehouses had appeared in Europe some years earlier, the Viennese café tradition became an important part of the city's identity.

Coffee is served in a variety of styles, particularly in the Viennese coffee houses. An Austrian Mokka or kleiner Schwarzer is similar to espresso, but is extracted more slowly. Other styles are prepared from the Mokka:

- großer Schwarzer – a double Mokka
- kleiner Brauner or großer Brauner – single or double Mokka plus milk
- Verlängerter – "lengthened" (i.e., diluted) Mokka with more water plus milk
- Melange – half Mokka, half heated milk, often topped with foamed milk
- Franziskaner – Melange topped with whipped cream and foamed milk
- Kapuziner – kleiner Schwarzer plus whipped cream
- Einspänner – großer Schwarzer topped with whipped cream
- Wiener Eiskaffee – iced Mokka with vanilla ice cream, topped with whipped cream

Italian styles such as cappuccino, espresso and latte are also commonly served.

Traditionally, coffee is served with a glass of still water.

Drinking coffee together is an important social activity in Austrian culture. It is quite common for Austrians to invite friends or neighbours over for coffee and cake. This routine activity can be compared to the British afternoon tea tradition. It is also very common to go to a coffeehouse while dating.

=== Hot chocolate ===
Viennese hot chocolate is very rich, containing heavy cream in addition to chocolate, and sometimes thickened further with egg yolk.

=== Soft drinks ===
Almdudler is an Austrian soft drink based on mountain herbs and with a flavour reminiscent of sambucus beverages. It is considered the "national drink of Austria", and is popularly used as a mixer with white wine or water. While Red Bull is popular all across the West, the energy drink company started in Austria. The headquarters of the Red Bull company are located at Fuschl am See near Salzburg.

Skiwasser is a traditional Austrian beverage, made by mixing water, raspberry syrup, and lemon juice. Skiwasser originated in Austrian Tyrol, offered in winter ski huts and lodges. It is usually non-alcoholic, but alcoholic variations have been created.

=== Beer ===
Beer is generally sold in the following sizes: 0.2 litre (a Pfiff), 0.33 litre (a Seidel, kleines Bier or Glas Bier) and 0.5 litre (a Krügerl or großes Bier or Hoibe). At festivals one litre Maß and two litre Doppelmaß in the Bavarian style are also sometimes dispensed. The most popular types of beer are pale lager (known as Märzen in Austria), naturally cloudy Zwicklbier, and wheat beer. At holidays like Christmas and Easter bock beer is also available.

Austrian beers are typically in the pale lager style, with the exceptions noted above. A dark amber "Vienna style" lager was pioneered in the city during the 19th century but is no longer common there.

=== Wine ===
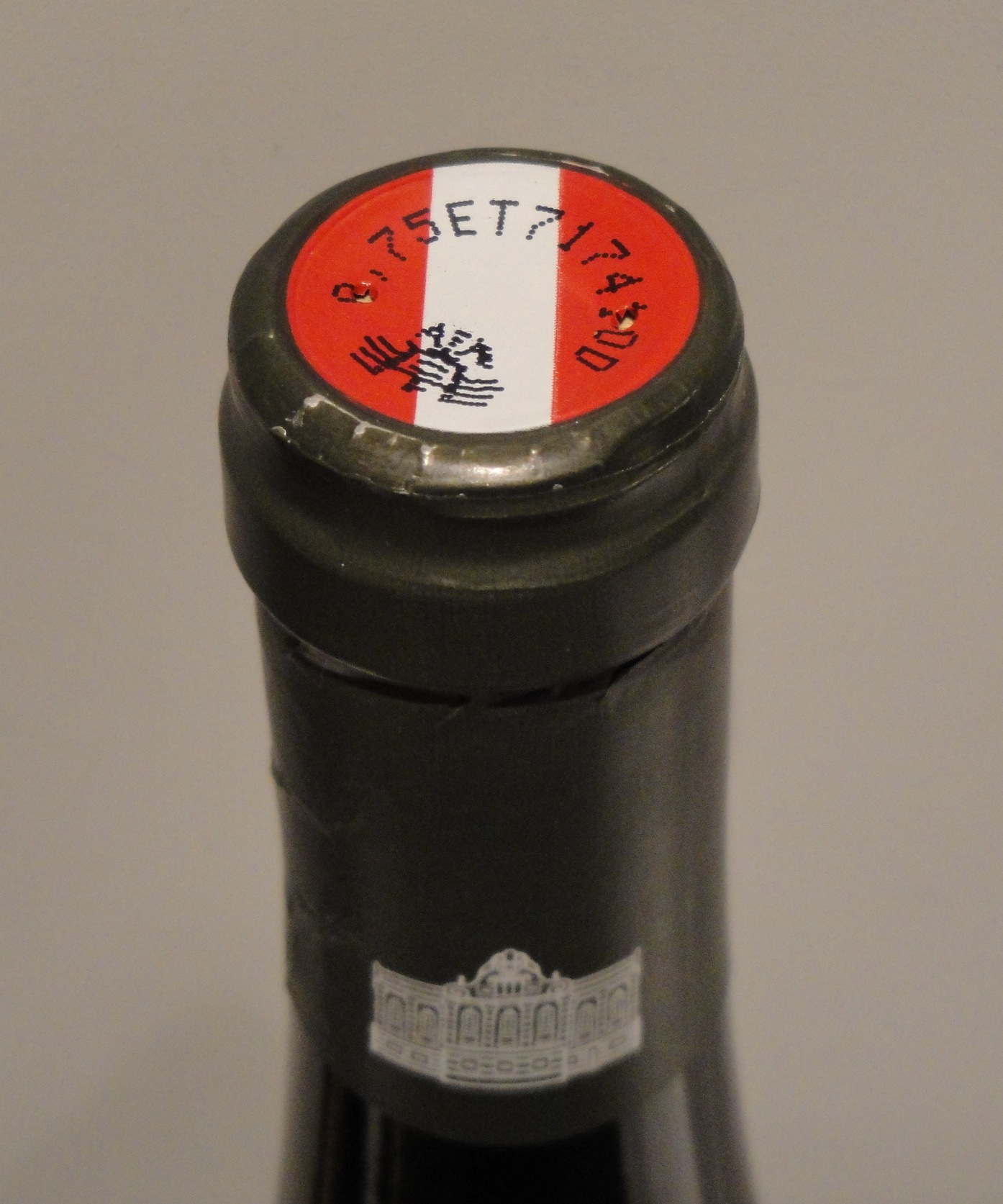
The Austrian wine seal is used on all wines at Qualitätswein level.

Wine is principally cultivated in the east of Austria. The most important wine-producing areas are in Lower Austria, Burgenland, Styria, and Vienna. The Grüner Veltliner grape provides some of Austria's most notable white wines; Zweigelt is the most widely planted red wine grape. Southern Burgenland is a region that mainly grows red grapes; the "Seewinkel" area, east of the Neusiedler See in Burgenland's north, has more mixed wine cultures and is famous for its sweet wines. Wine is even grown within the city limits of Vienna – the only European capital where this is true – and some is even produced under the auspices of the city council.

Young wine (i.e., wine produced from grapes of the most recent harvest) is called Heuriger and gives its name to inns in Vienna and its surroundings, which serve Heuriger wine along with food. In Styria, Carinthia and Burgenland, the Heuriger inns are known as Buschenschanken.

=== Other alcoholic drinks ===
In Upper Austria, Burgenland, Lower Austria, Styria and Carinthia, Most, the fresh juice of grapes or apples is produced, while Sturm ("storm"), a semi-fermented grape juice is drunk after the grape harvest. Most and Sturm are pre-stages of wine.

At the close of a meal, sometimes schnaps (fruit brandy), typically of up to 60% alcohol, is drunk. In Austria schnapps is made from a variety of fruits, for example apricots, rowanberries, gentiana roots, various herbs and even flowers. The produce of small private schnaps distilleries, of which there are around 20,000 in Austria, is known as Selberbrennter or Hausbrand.

== Snack food ==
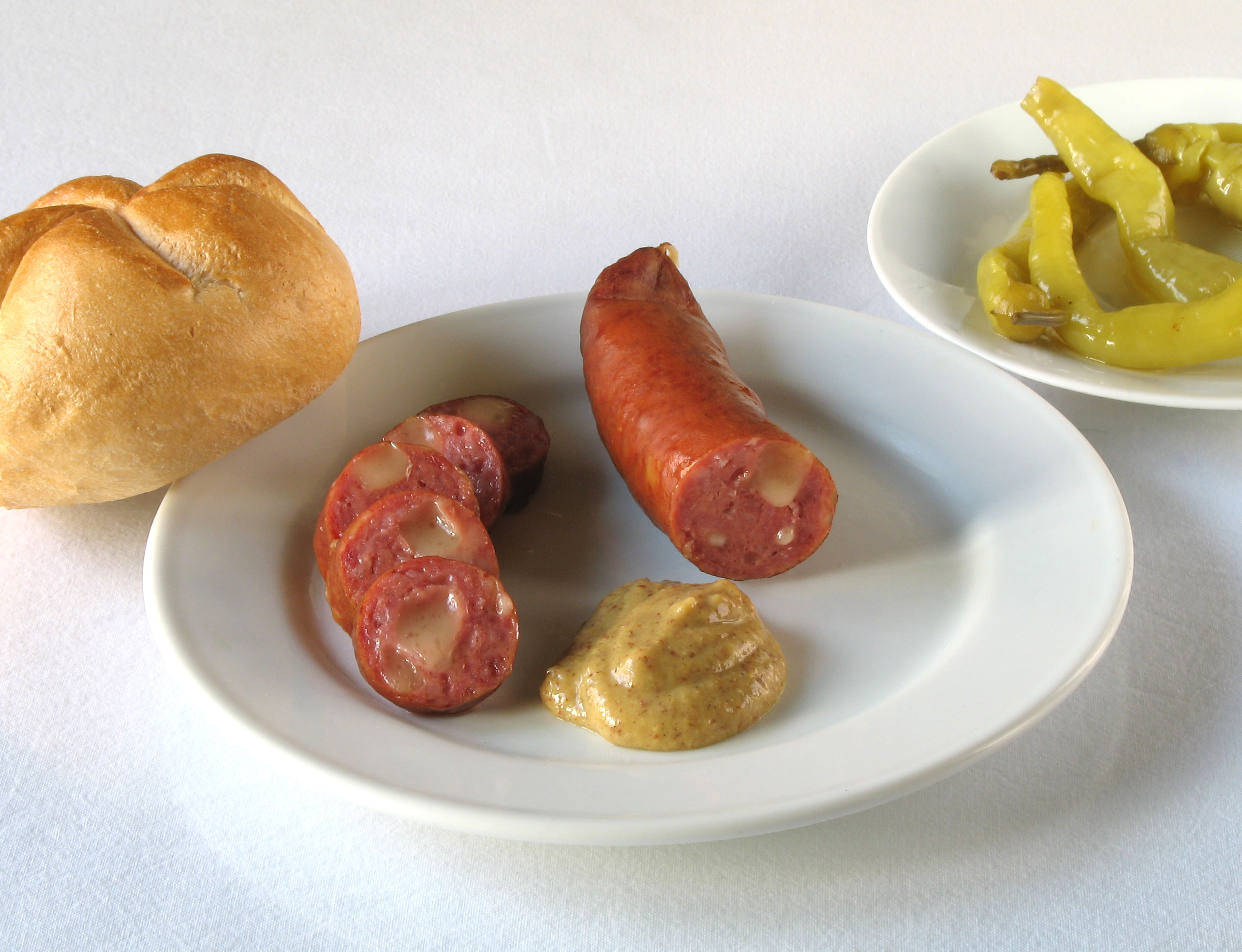
A Käsekrainer sausage with a Kaiser roll and mustard

For food consumed in between meals there are many types of open sandwiches called "belegte Brote", or different kinds of sausage with mustard, ketchup and bread, as well as sliced sausage, Leberkäse rolls or Schnitzelsemmeln (rolls filled with schnitzel).

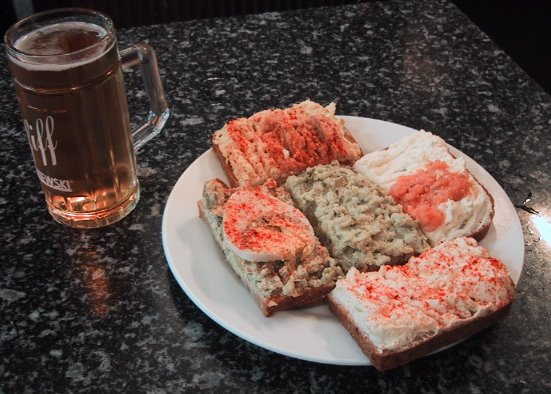
Open sandwiches in Vienna, with a Pfiff-size beer

Traditionally one can get a Wurstsemmel (a roll filled, usually, with Extrawurst, a special kind of thinly sliced sausage, often with a slice of cheese and a pickle or cornichon) at a butcher or at the delicatessen counter in a supermarket.

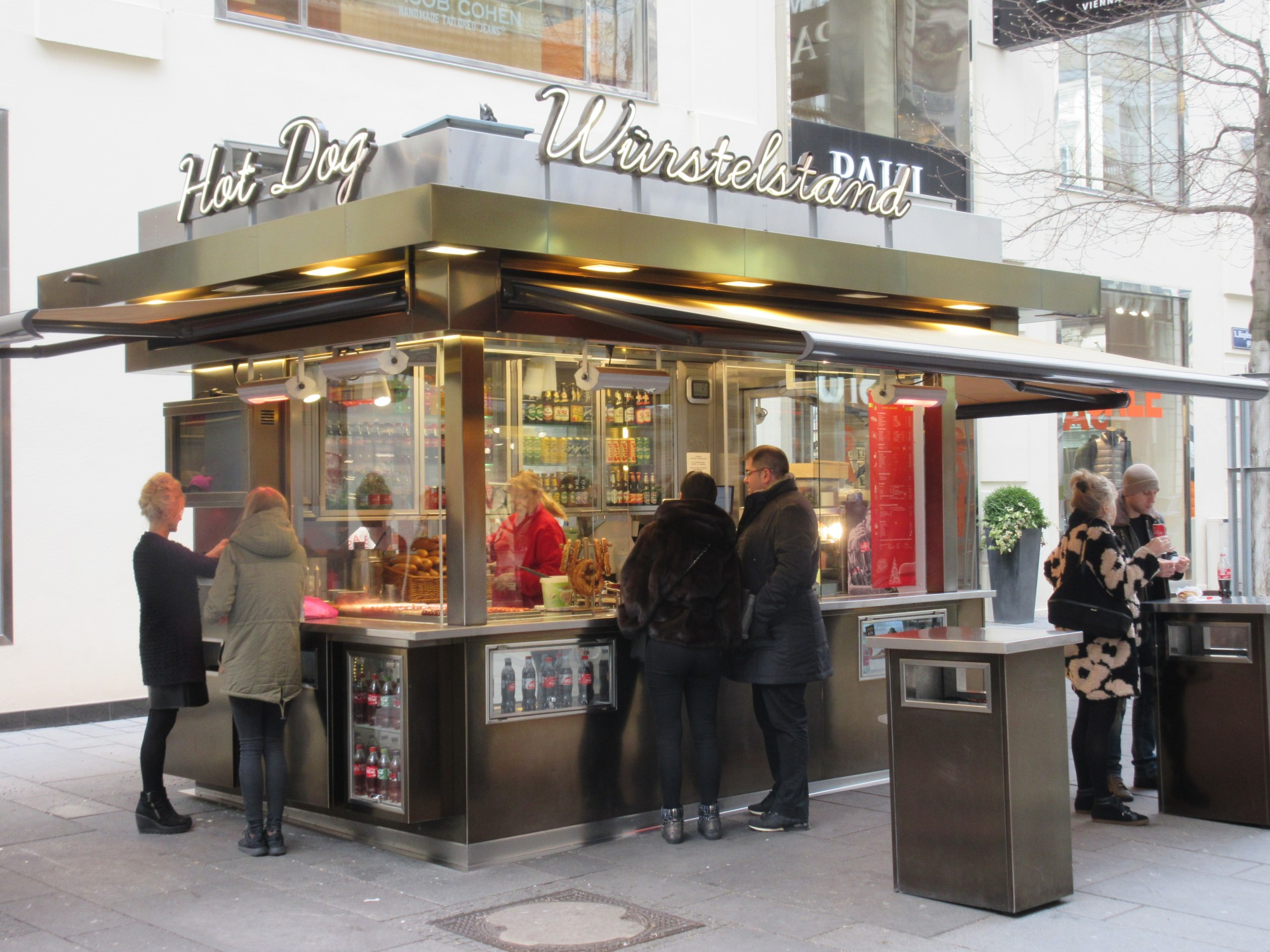
Viennese Würstelstand, Kärntner Straße

There are also other common yet informal delicacies that are typical of Austrian food. For example, the Bosna or Bosner (a spiced bratwurst in a hot dog roll), is an integral part of the menu at Austria's typical fast-food restaurant, the sausage stand (Würstelstand). Most Austrian sausages contain pork.

== Regional cuisine ==
=== Lower Austria ===
In Lower Austria, local delicacies such as Waldviertel poppies, Marchfeld asparagus and Wachau apricots are cultivated. Famous are the "Marillenknödel": small dumplings filled with apricots and warm butter-fried breadcrumbs on it. Their influence can be felt in the local cuisine, for example in poppy seed noodles "Mohnnudeln". Game dishes are very common. Lower Austria is striking for the differences within its regional cuisine due to its size and the variety of its landscape.

=== Burgenland ===
Burgenland's cuisine has been influenced by Hungarian cuisine owing to its former position within the Hungarian part of the Austro-Hungarian Empire. Dishes consist mainly of fish, chicken or pork. Potatoes are the most common side dish, for example, crushed potatoes with onions called "Greste Krumpian" (= Geröstete Kartoffeln, which comes from "geröstet", meaning "roasted", and the Hungarian term "krumpli" for potatoes). Because of Hungarian influence, Burgenlandish dishes are often spicier than elsewhere in Austria, often indicated with the terms "Zigeuner..." ("Gypsy") or "Serbisch..." ("Serbian"). Polenta is a popular side-dish within Burgenland's Croatian minority. On St Martin's Day (November 11) a Martinigans (St Martin's goose) is often prepared, and carp is a typical Christmas dish.

=== Styria ===
Styrian taverns where local winemakers serve their new wine, local cold food and homemade cakes are called Buschenschank. They are famous for their Brettljause, a cold hors d'oeuvre served on a wooden board, typical with Verhackertes (a spread made from finely chopped raw white bacon), different types of cold meat (Gselchtes: salted and smoked meat, Schweinsbraten: roast pork, air-dried sausages, Speck: ham) grated horseradish, hard-boiled eggs, meat paste, Liptauer, pumpkin seed spread, vegetables, pickles and cheese with sourdough bread, also Käferbohnensalat (runner bean salad) with pumpkin seed oil is typical. Schilcher, a very dry rosé, is the regional style of wine found in Western Styria. A typically Styrian delicacy is pumpkin seed oil, which lends itself particularly to salads on account of its nutty flavour. Many kinds of pumpkin dishes are also very popular. Heidensterz, resembling a dry, almost crumbly version of grits made from buckwheat flour, is a local dish enjoyed in cold weather. Especially in autumn, game dishes are very common.

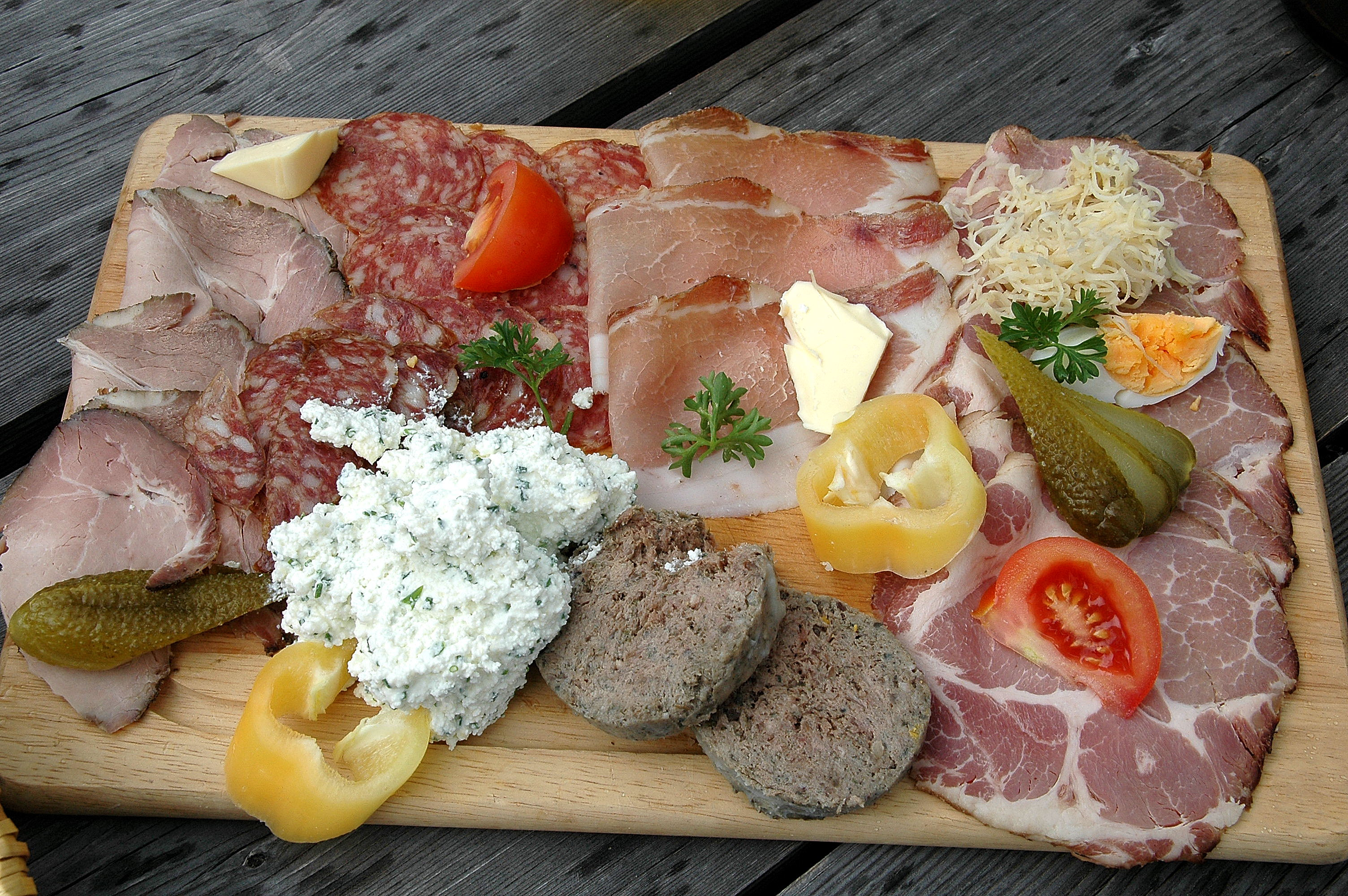
Styrian Brettljause, a cold hors d'oeuvre

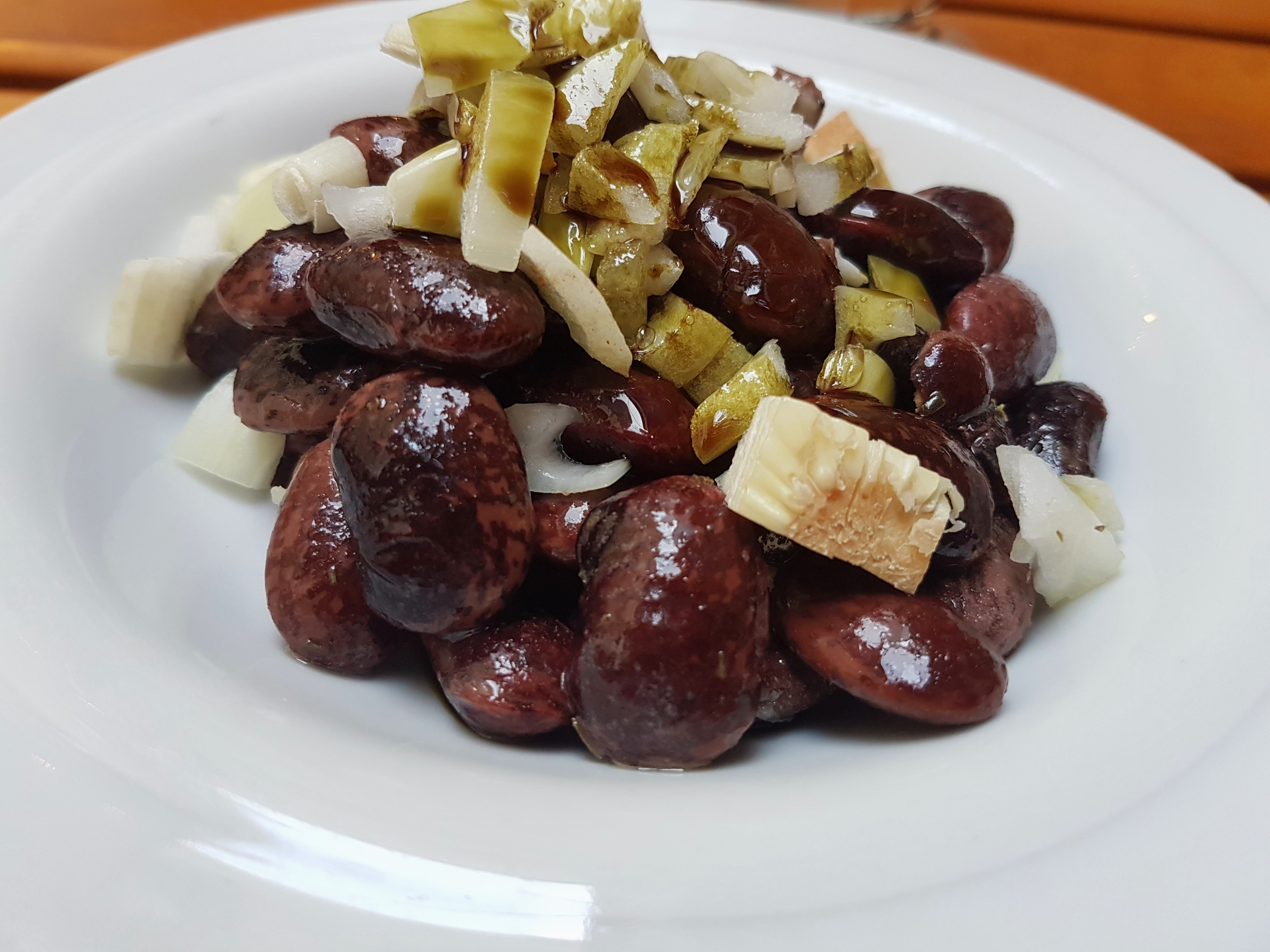
Käferbohnensalat, runner bean salad with onions and pumpkin seed oil

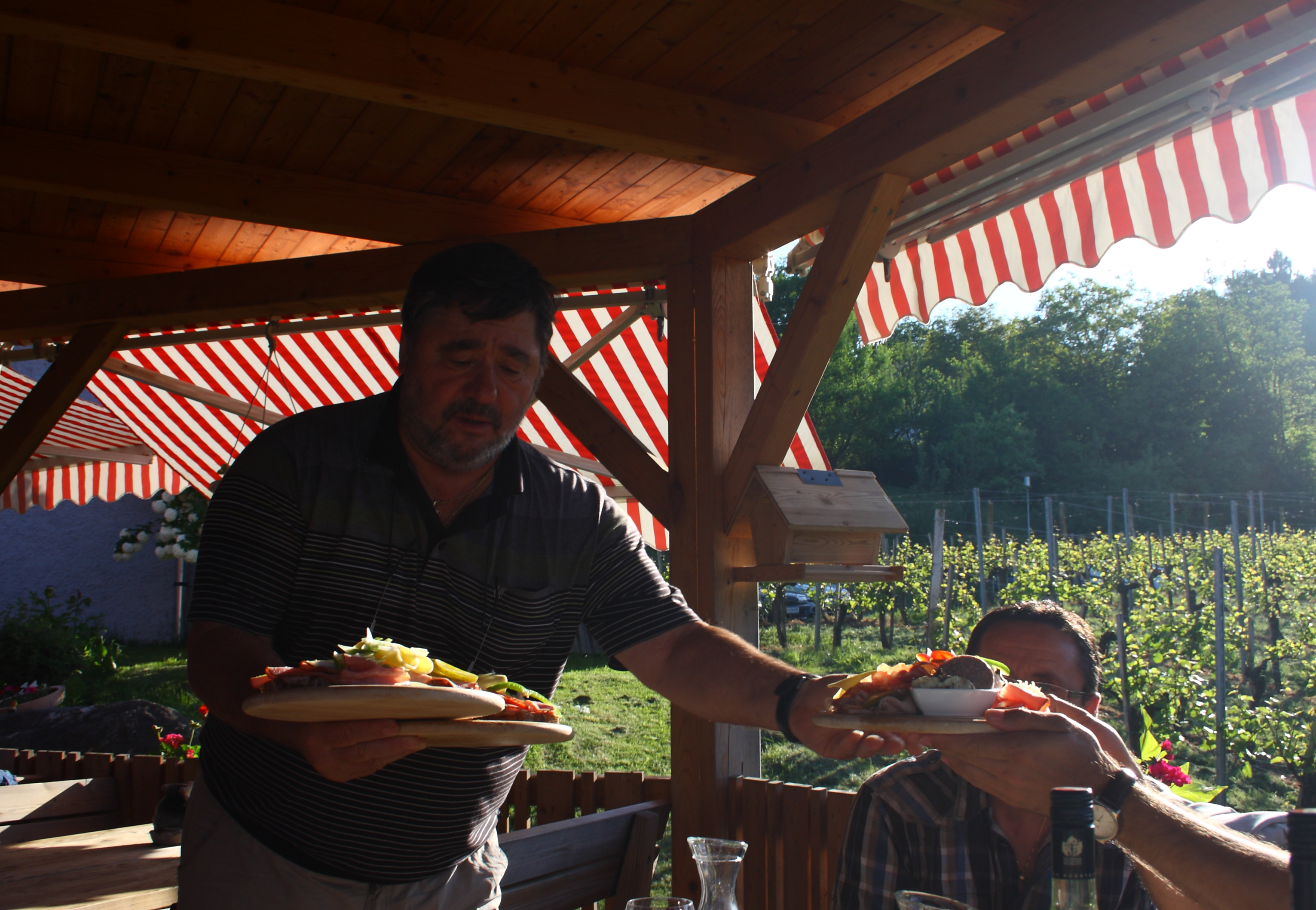
Buschenschank, Kapun winery, Gamlitz, Southern Styria, Austria

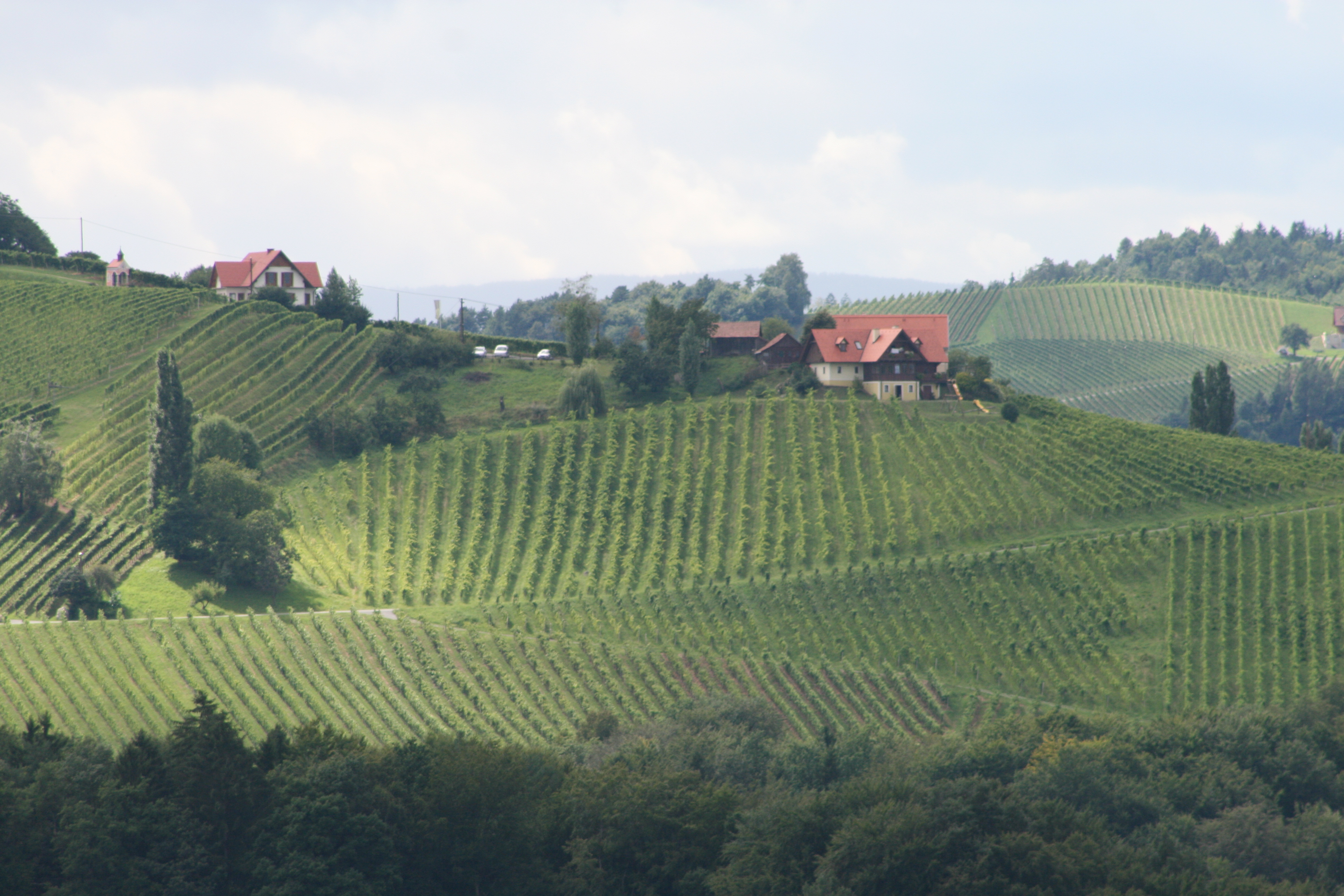
South Styrian vineyards

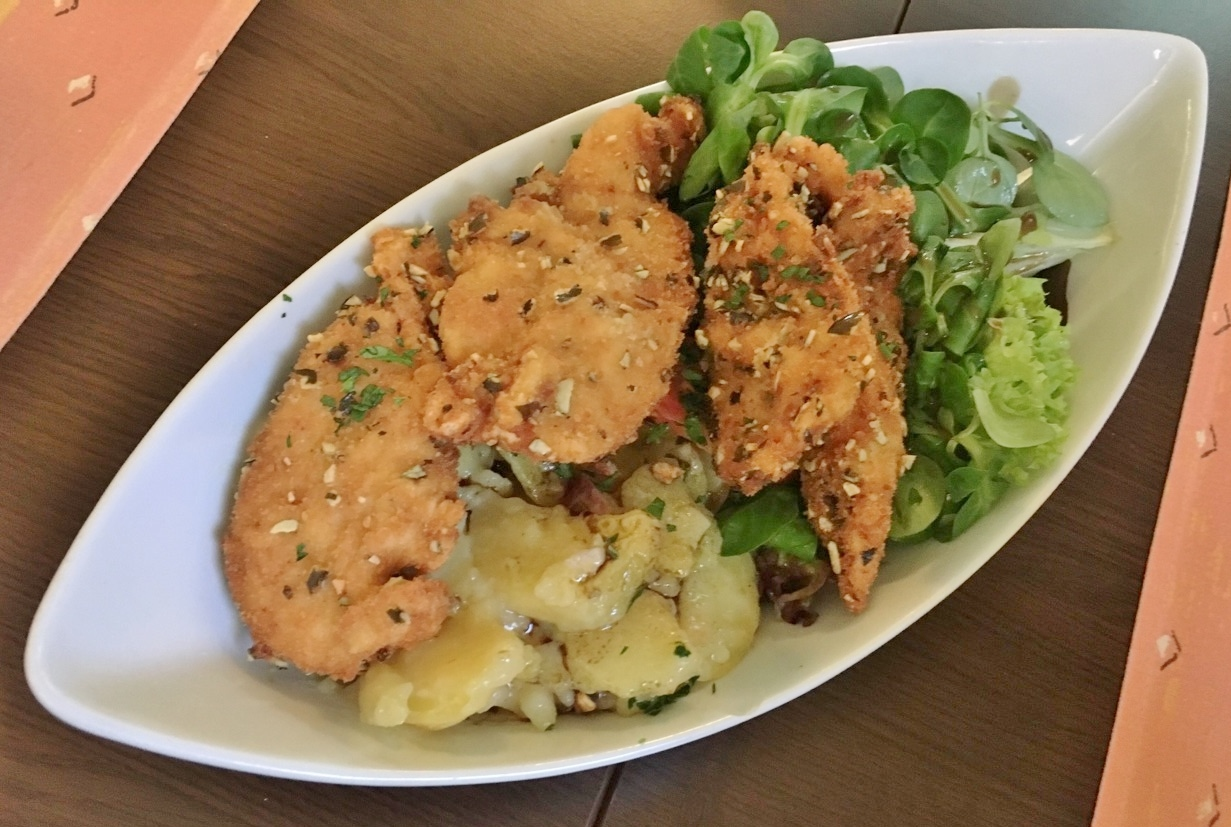
Styrian fried chicken salad with potato- and cornsalad

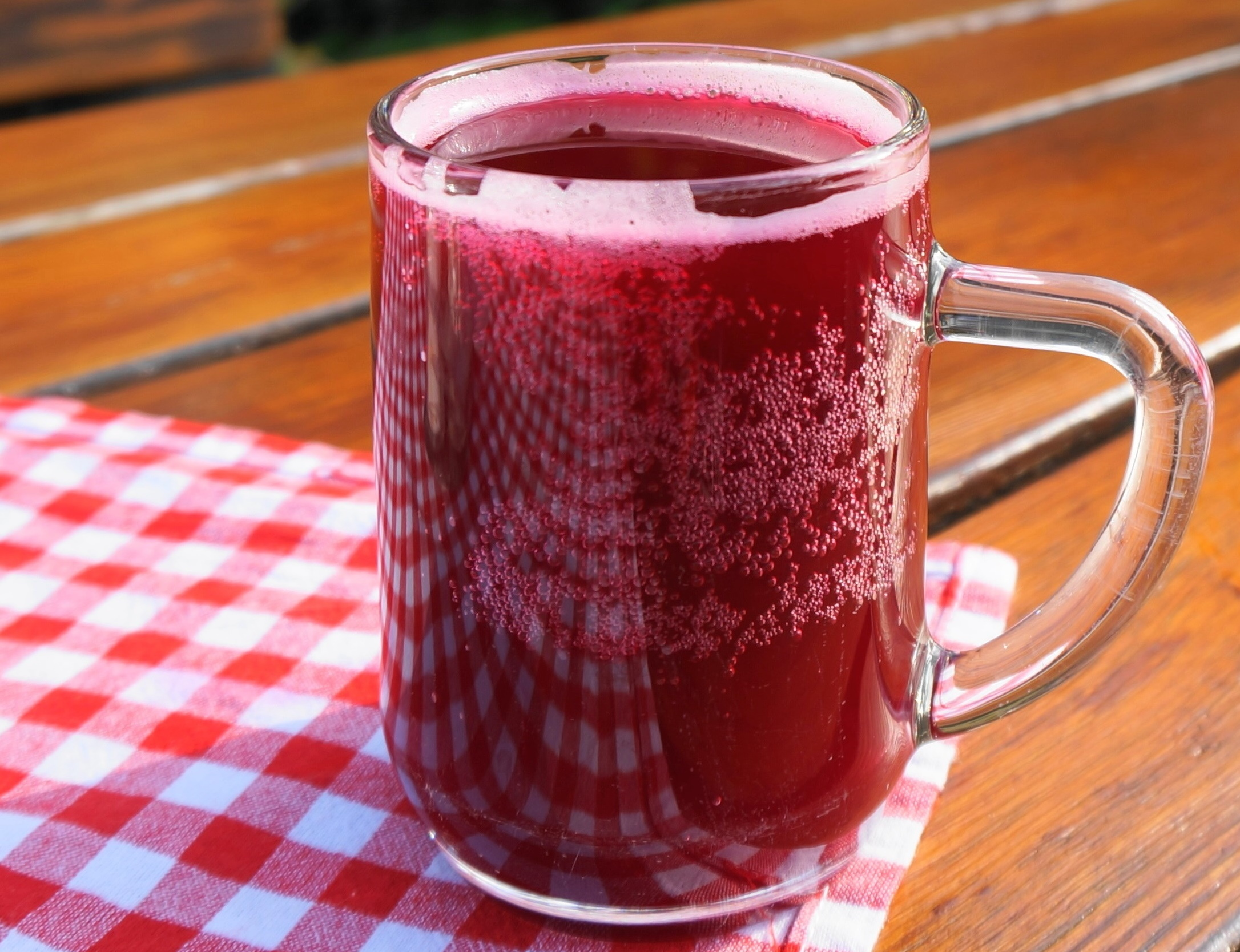
Schilchersturm

=== Carinthia ===
Carinthia's many lakes mean that fish is a popular main course. Grain, dairy produce and meat are important ingredients in Carinthian cuisine. Carinthian Kasnudeln (noodle dough pockets filled with quark and mint) and smaller Schlickkrapfen (mainly with a meat filling) are well-known local delicacies. Klachlsuppe (pig's trotter soup) and Reindling (yeast-dough pastry/cake filled with a mix of cinnamon, sugar, walnuts and raisins) are also produced locally.

=== Upper Austria ===
Various types of dumplings are an important part of Upper Austrian cuisine, as they are in neighbouring Bavaria and Bohemia. Linzertorte, a cake that includes ground almonds or nuts and redcurrant jam, is a popular dessert from the city of Linz, the capital of Upper Austria. Linzeraugen are fine, soft biscuits filled with redcurrant jam called Ribiselmarmelade, which has a sharp flavour.

=== Salzburg ===
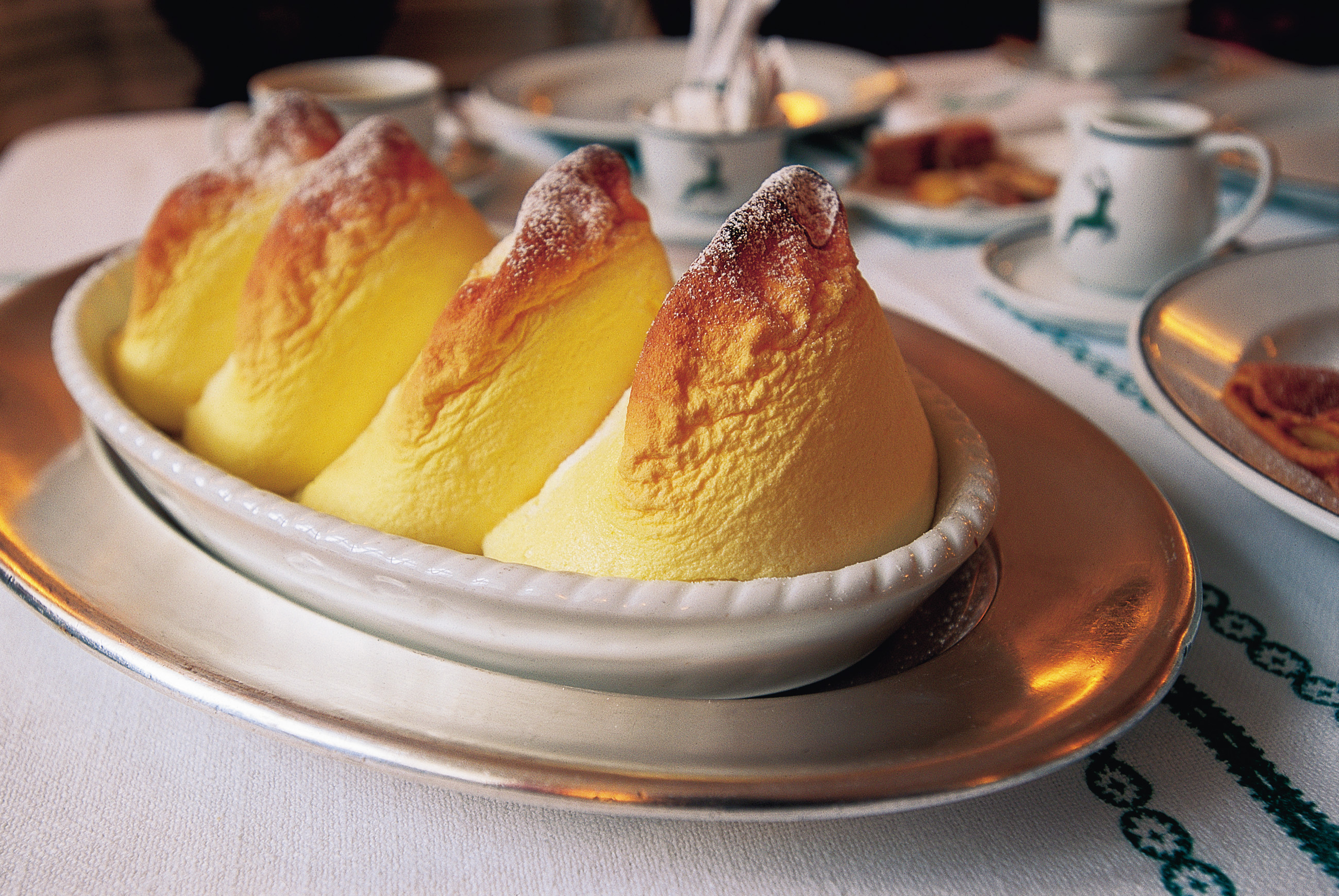
Salzburger Nockerln

Kasnocken (cheese dumplings) are a popular meal, as are freshwater fish, particularly trout, served in various ways. Salzburger Nockerl (a meringue-like dish) is a well-known local dessert.

=== Tyrol ===
Tyrolean bacon and all sorts of dumplings including Speckknödel (dumplings with pieces of bacon) and Spinatknödel (made of spinach) are an important part of the local cuisine. Tyrolean cuisine is very simple because in earlier times Tyroleans were not very rich, farming on mountains and in valleys in the middle of the Alpine Region. Tyrolean food often contains milk, cheese, flour and lard.

=== Vorarlberg ===
The cuisine of Vorarlberg has been influenced by the Alemannic cuisine of neighbouring Switzerland and Swabia. Cheese and cheese products play a major role in the cuisine, with Käsknöpfle and Kässpätzle (egg noodles prepared with cheese) being popular dishes. Other delicacies include Krautspätzle (sauerkraut noodles), Käsdönnala (similar to a quiche), Schupfnudla (made from a dough mixing potato and flour), Frittatensuppe (pancake soup), Öpfelküachle (apple cake) and Funkaküachle (cake traditionally eaten on the first Sunday of Lent).

== Gallery ==
Dishes

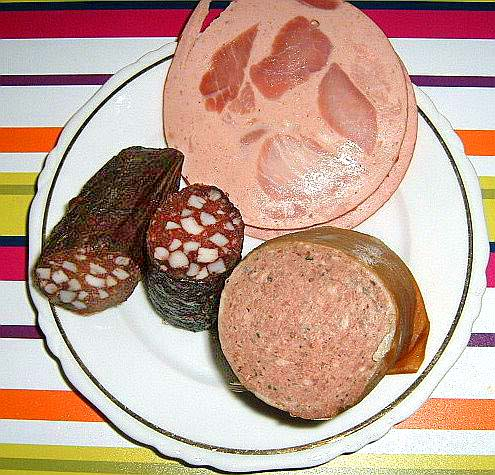
Bierschinken, Leberwurst and Blutwurst

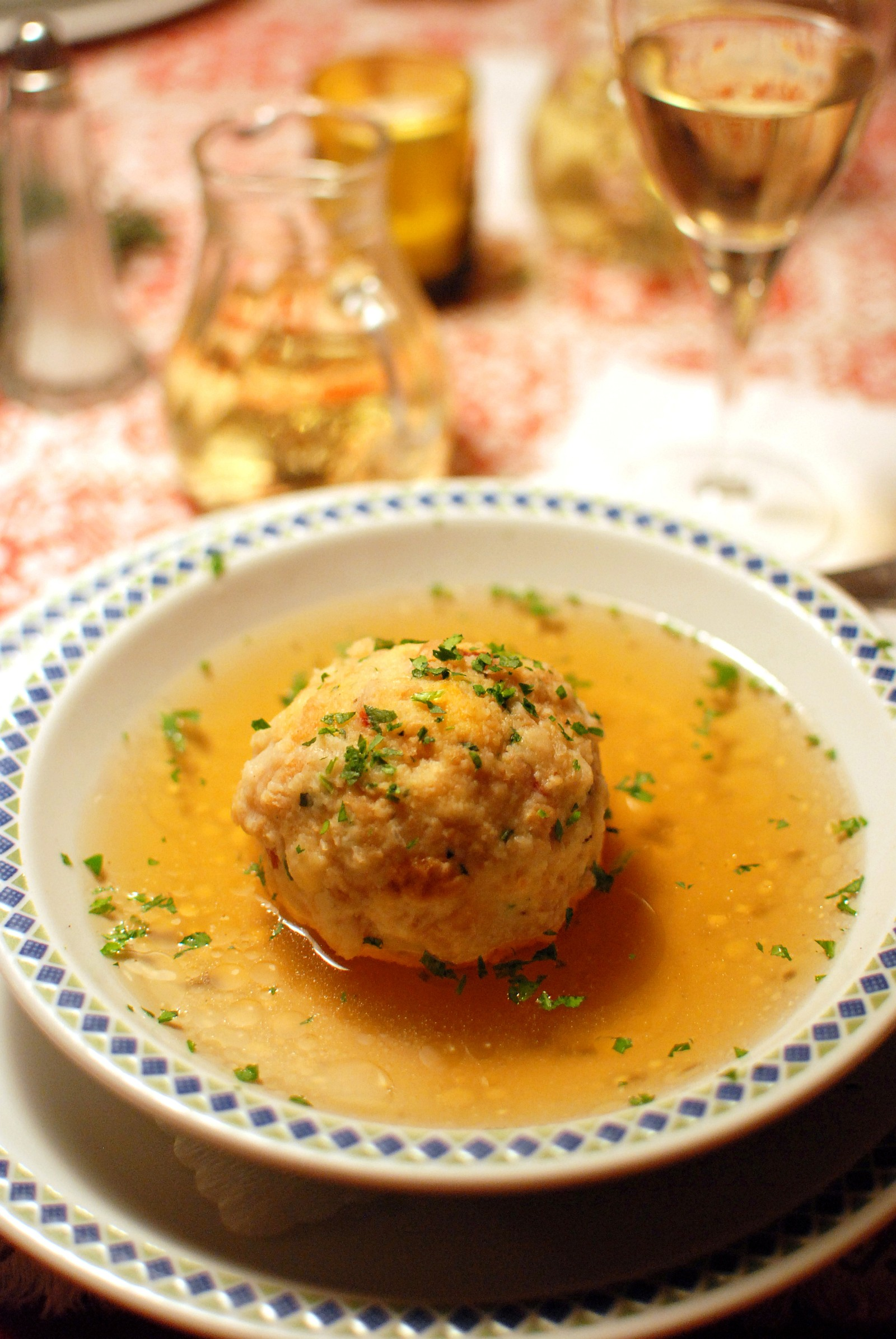
Tiroler Speckknödelsuppe

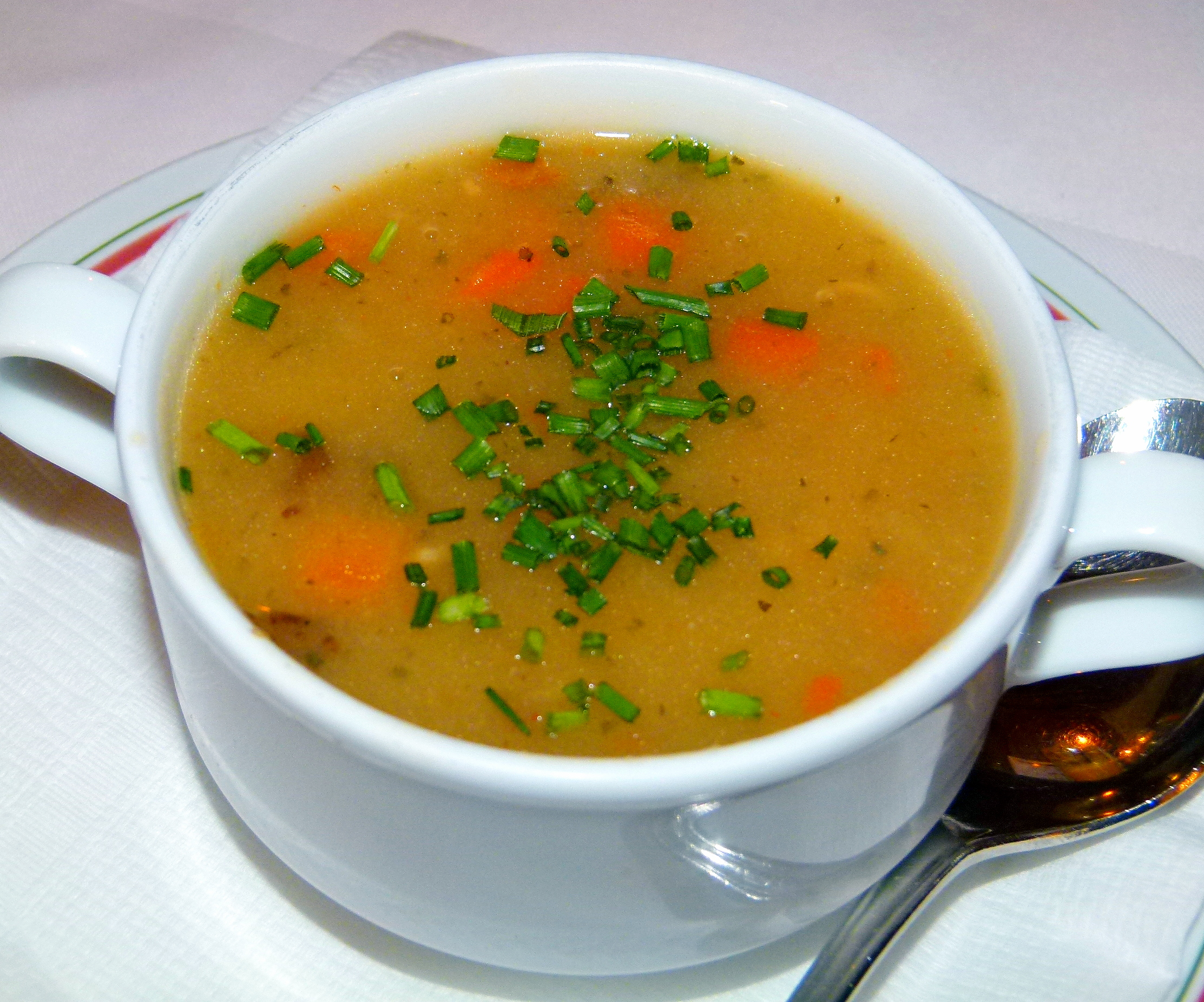
Kartoffelsuppe

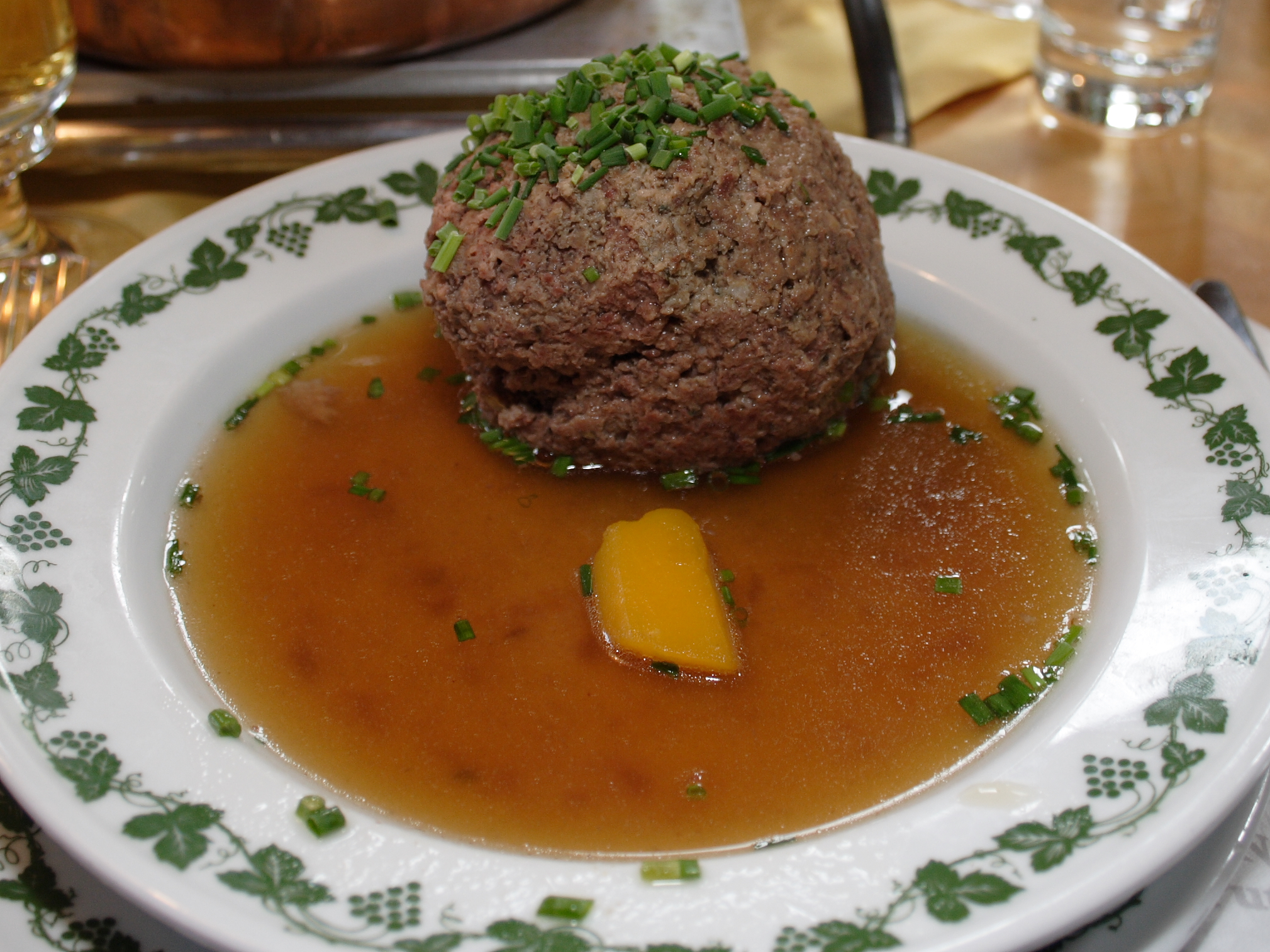
Leberknödelsuppe

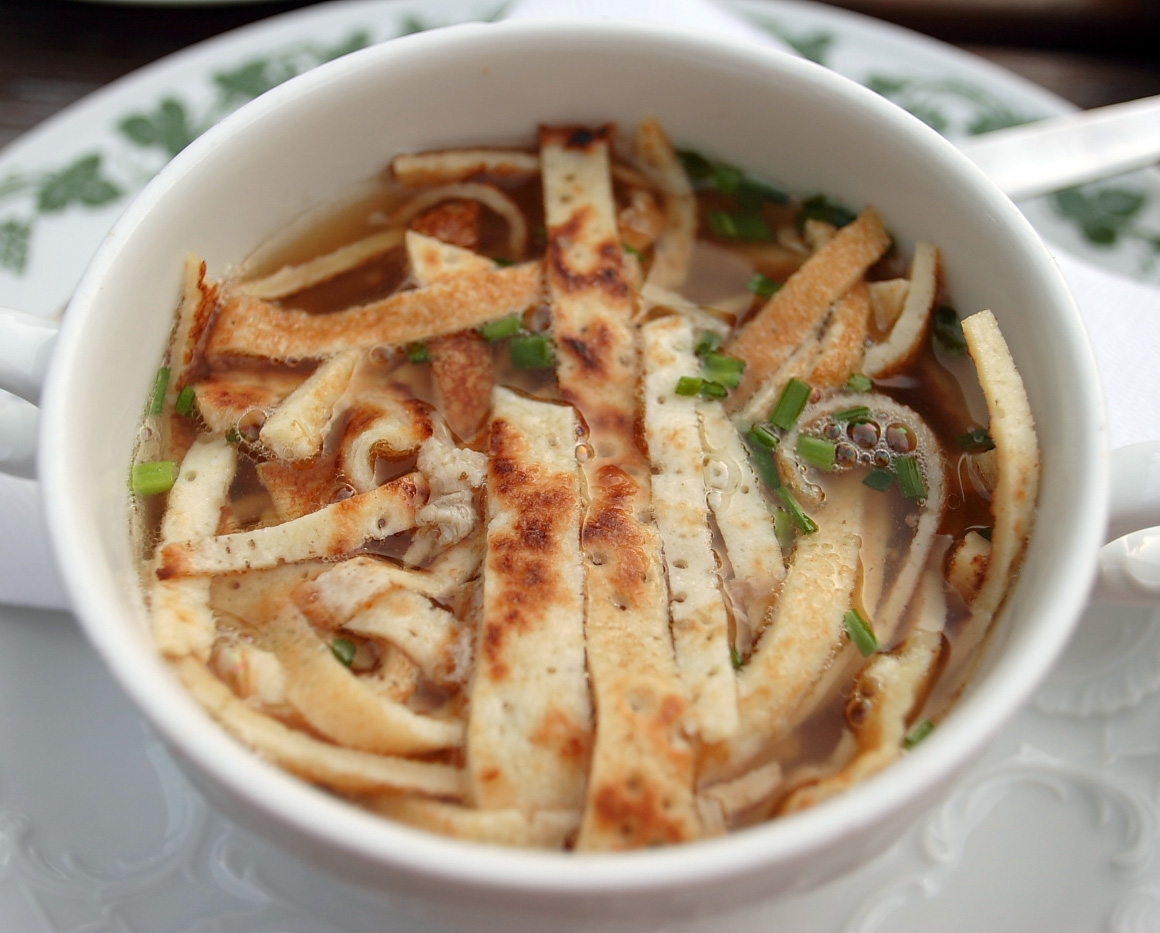
Frittatensuppe

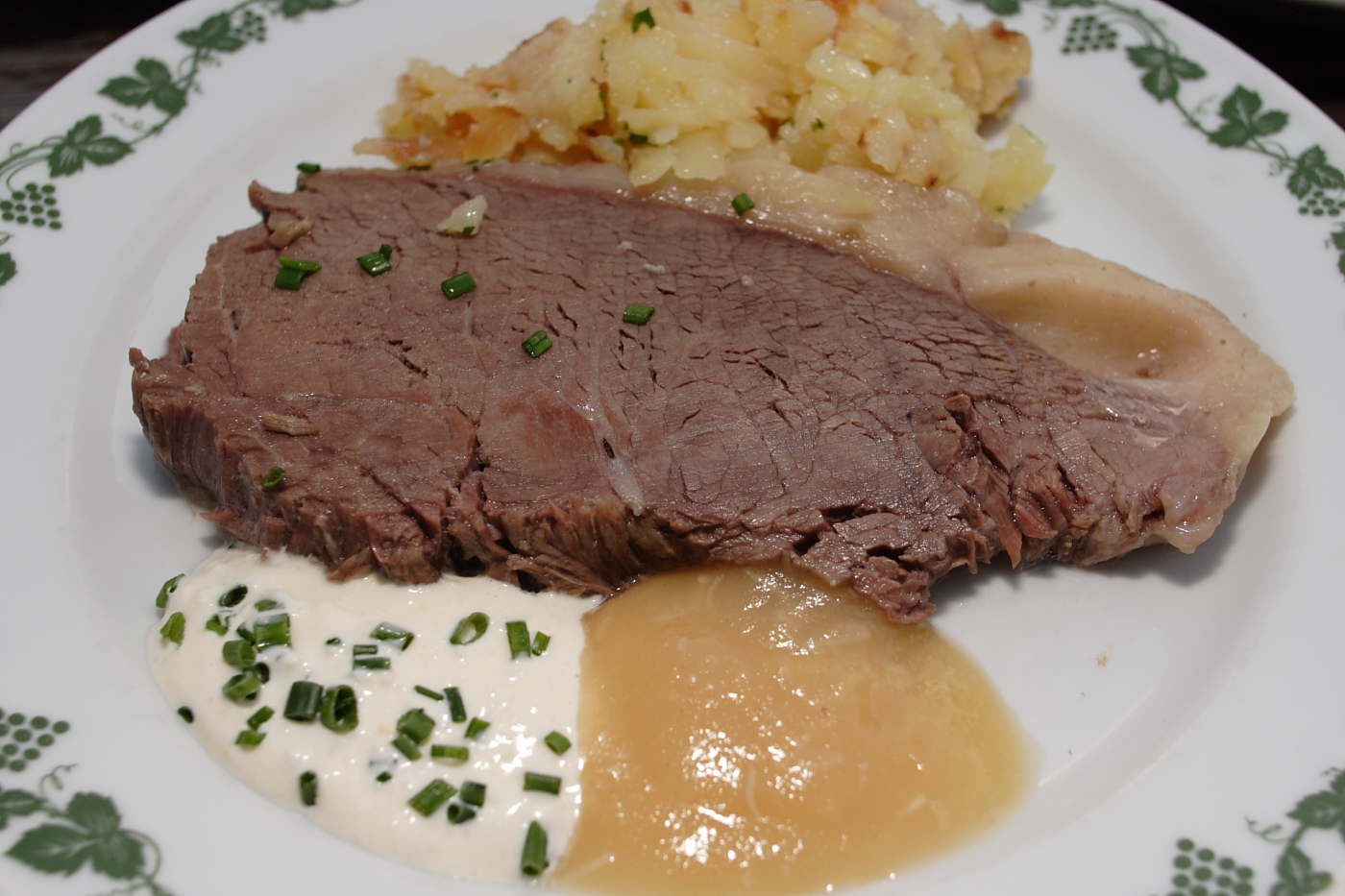
Tafelspitz

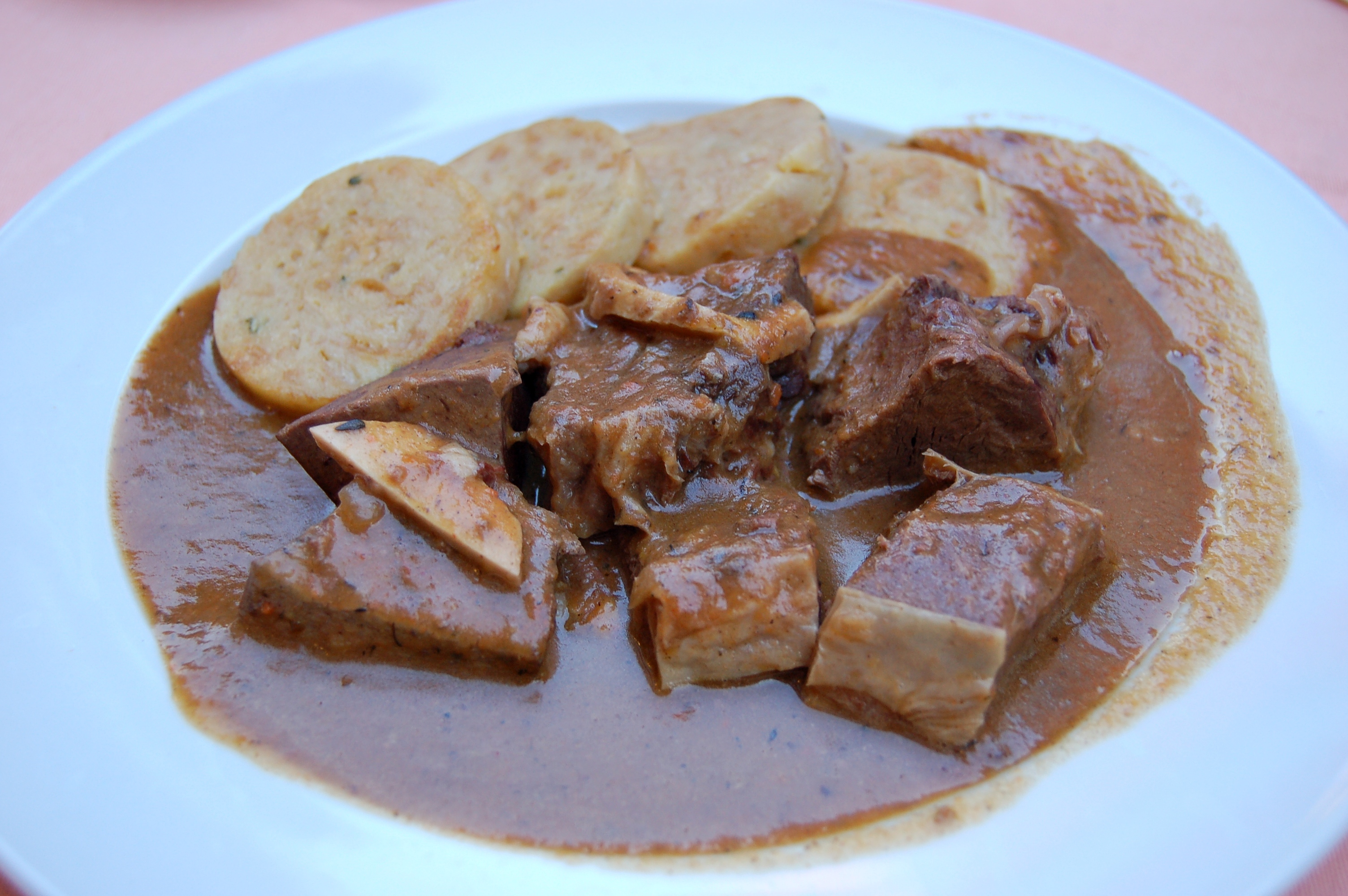
Bruckfleisch

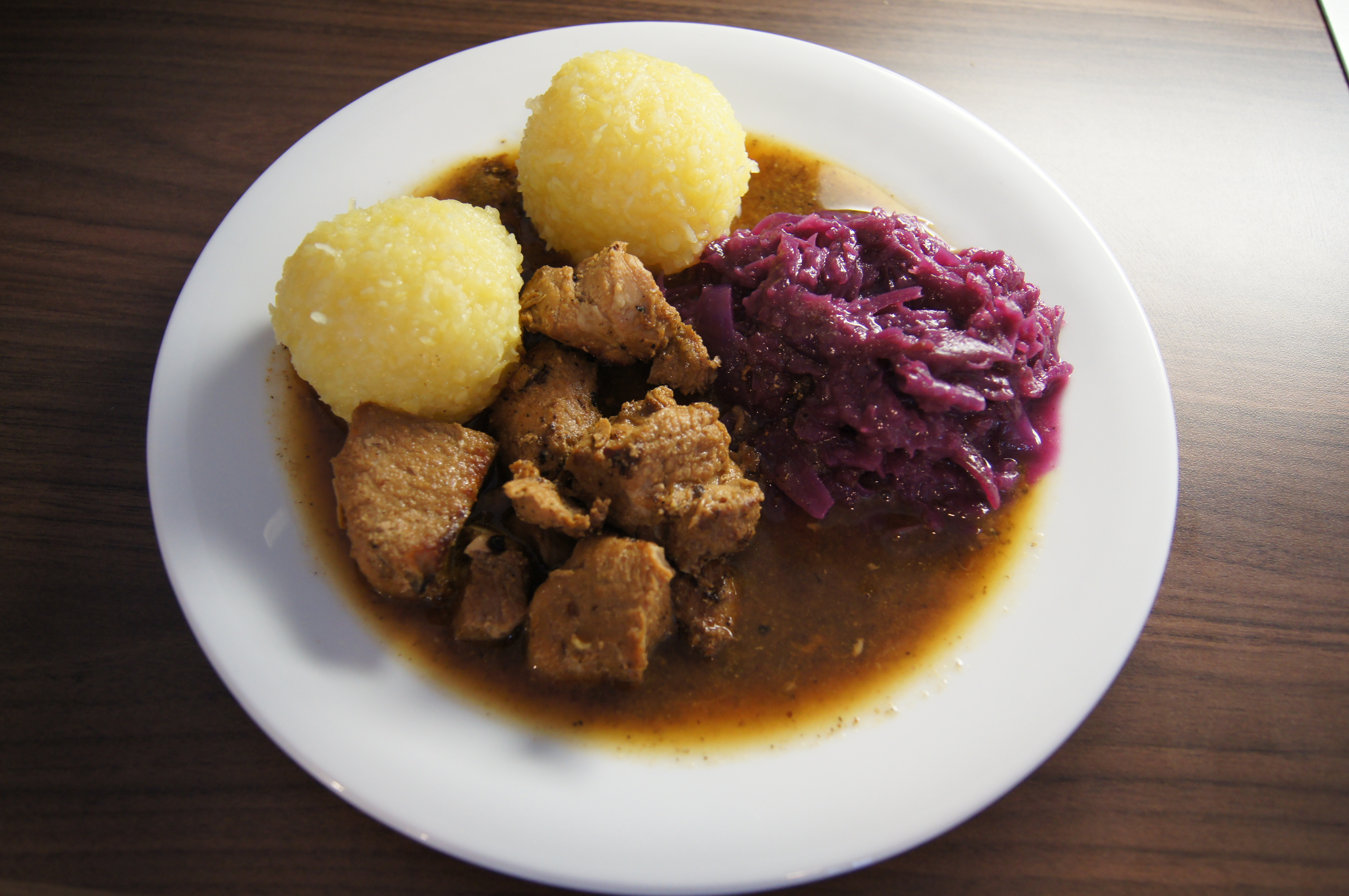
Rindergulasch

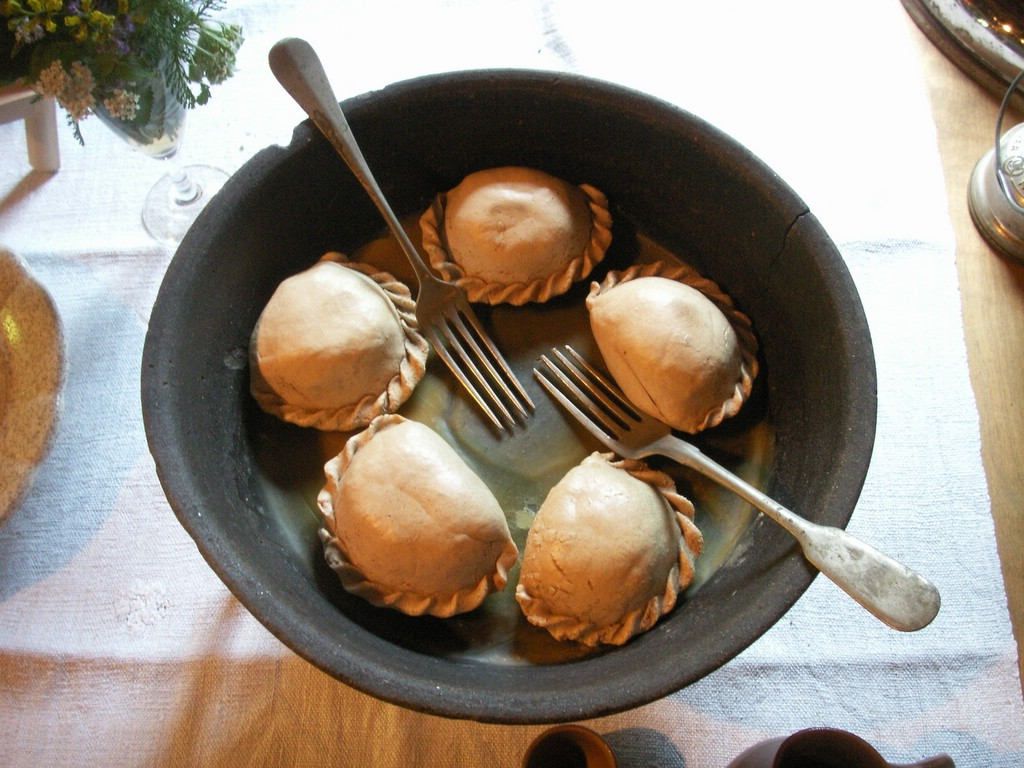
Käsnudel - Carinthian cheese noodles

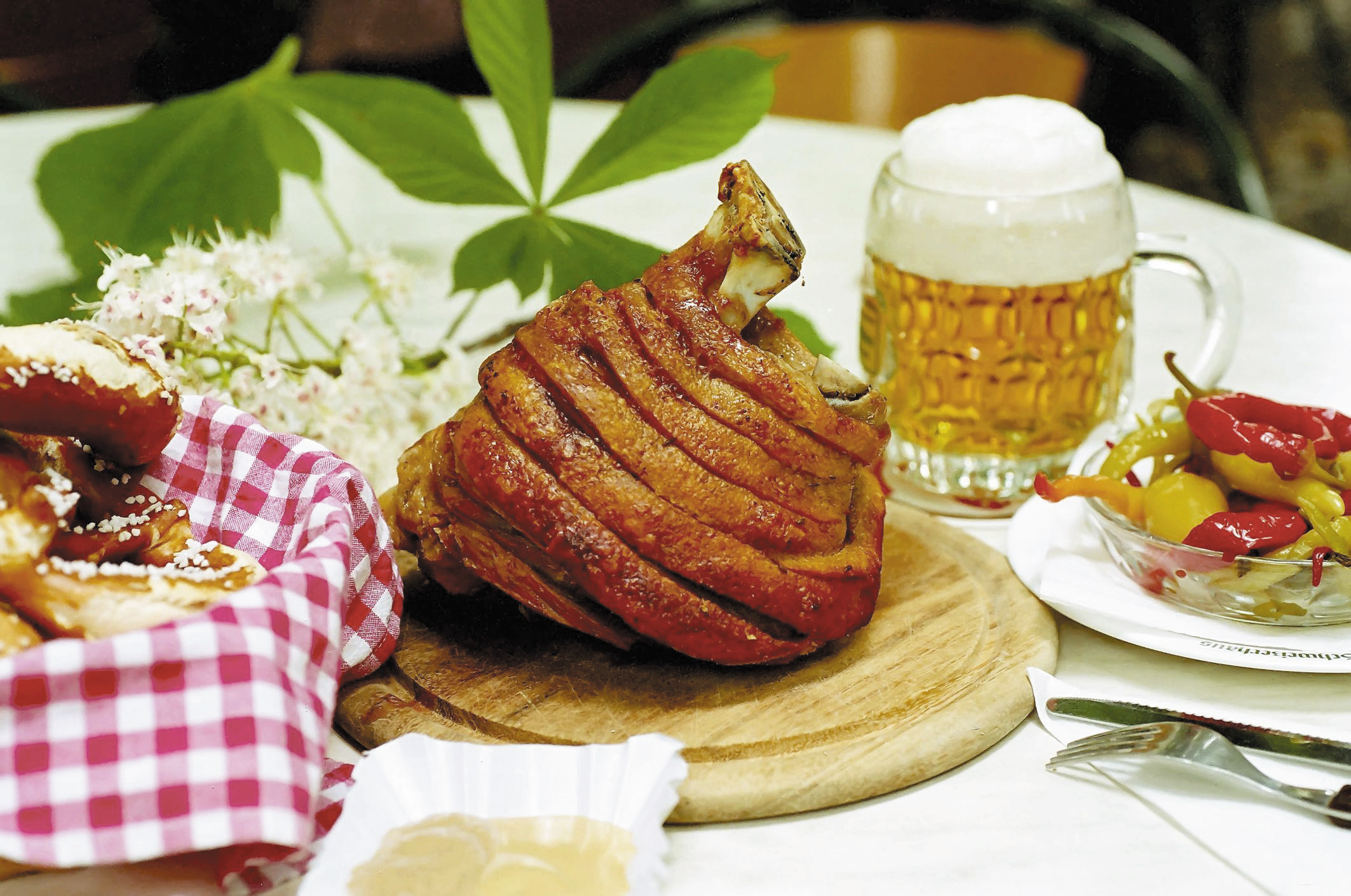
Stelze

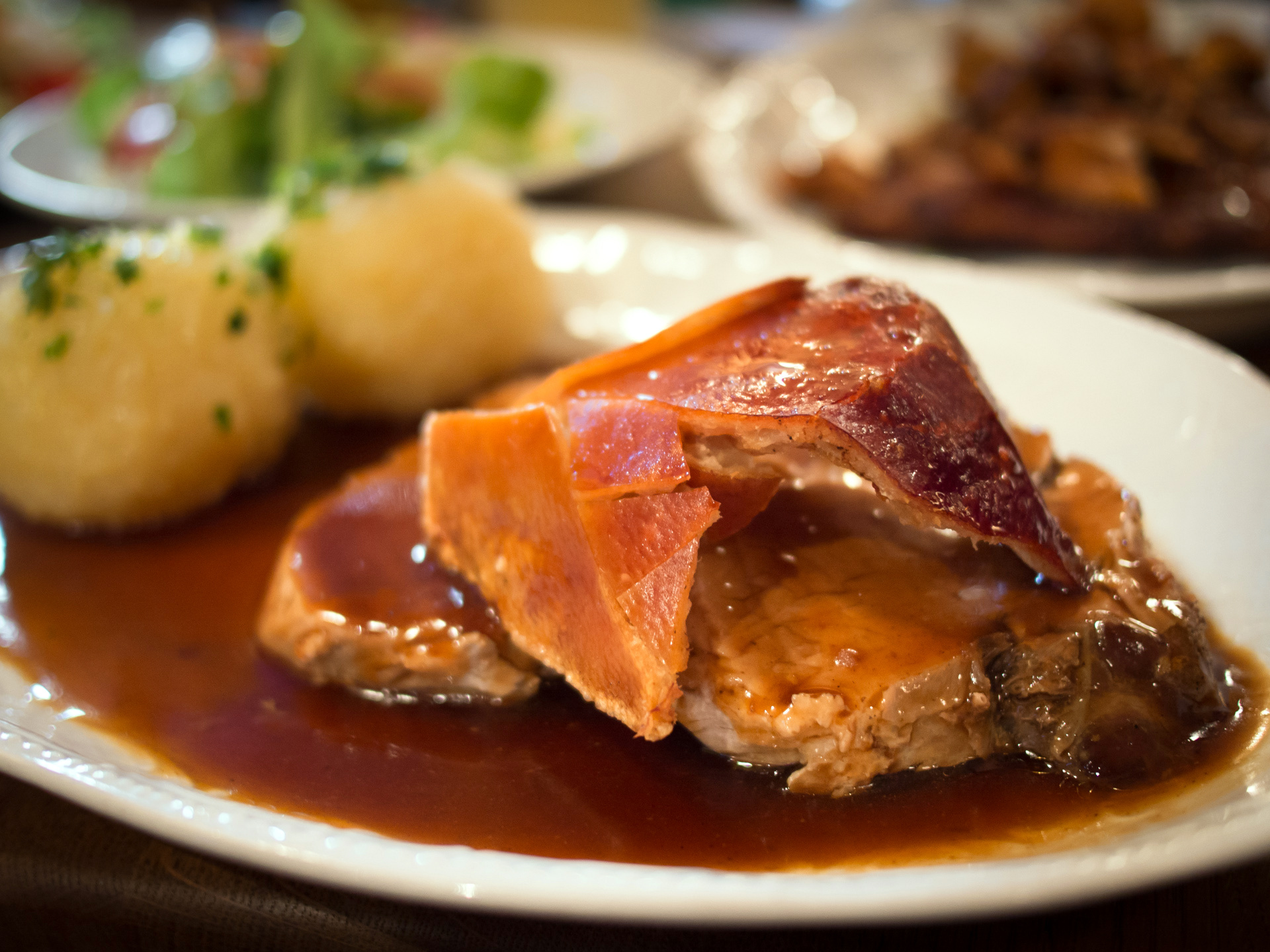
Krustenbraten mit Dunkelbiersoße (baked pork served with a dark beer sauce)

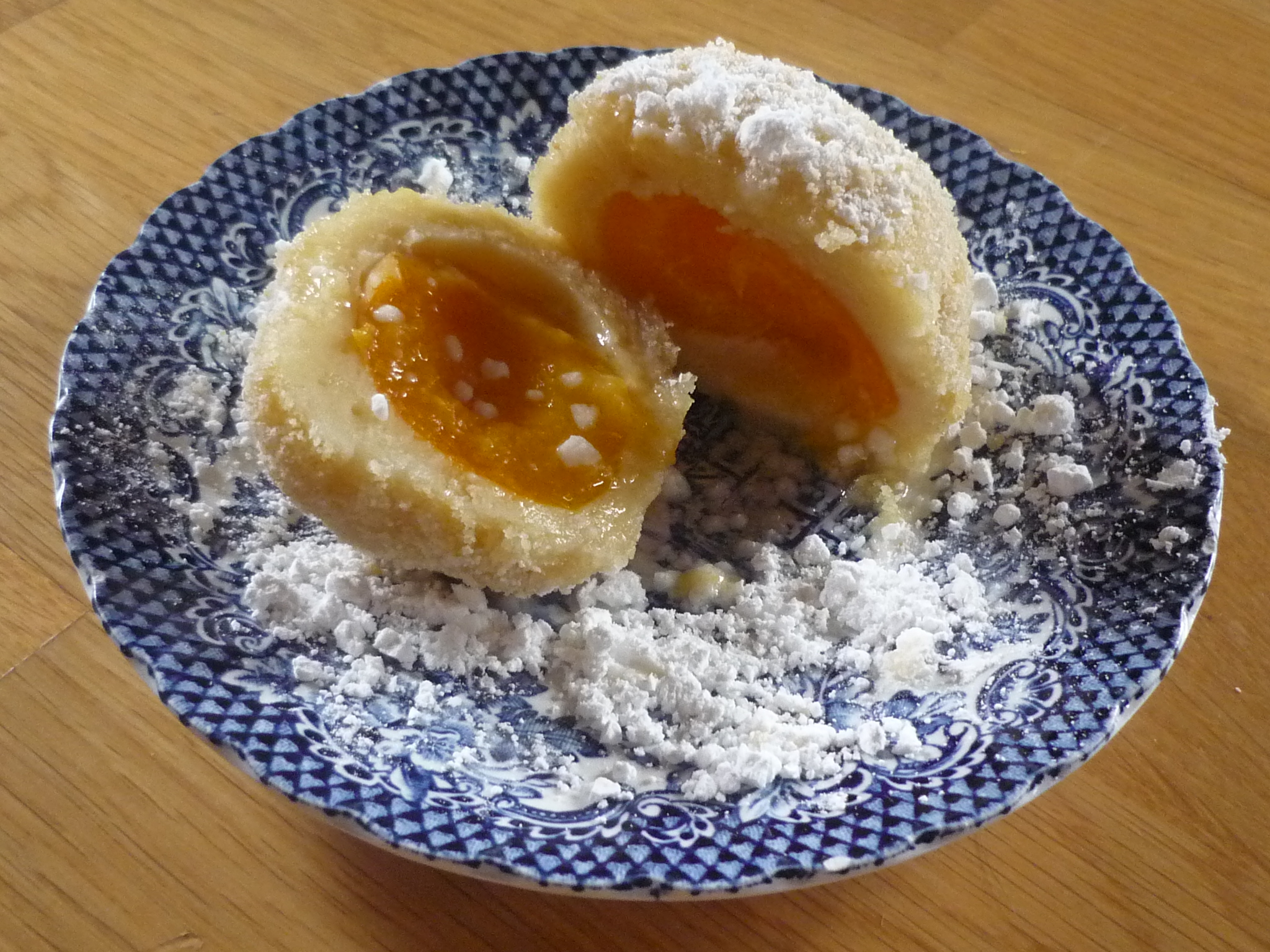
Marillenknödel

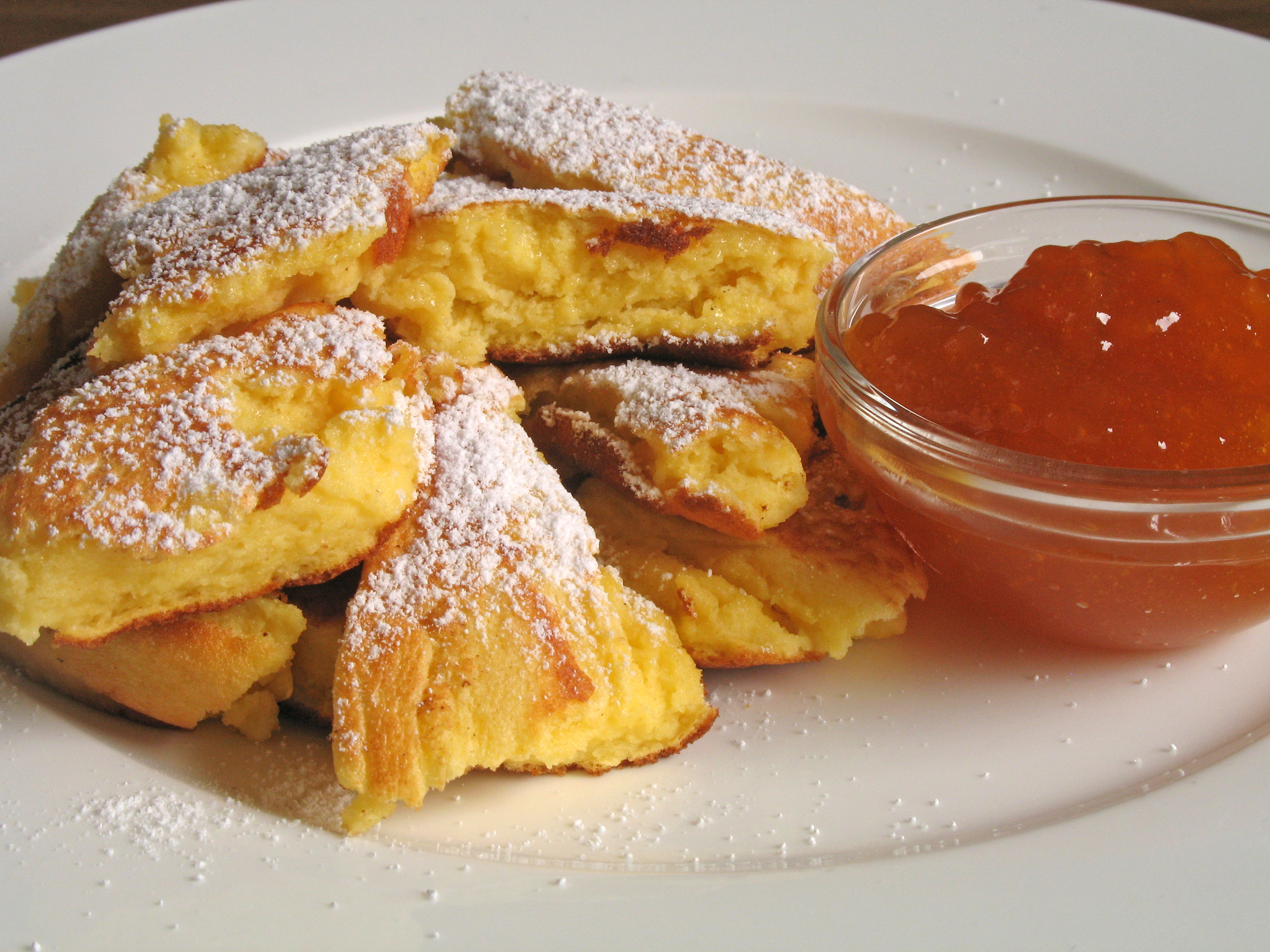
Kaiserschmarrn

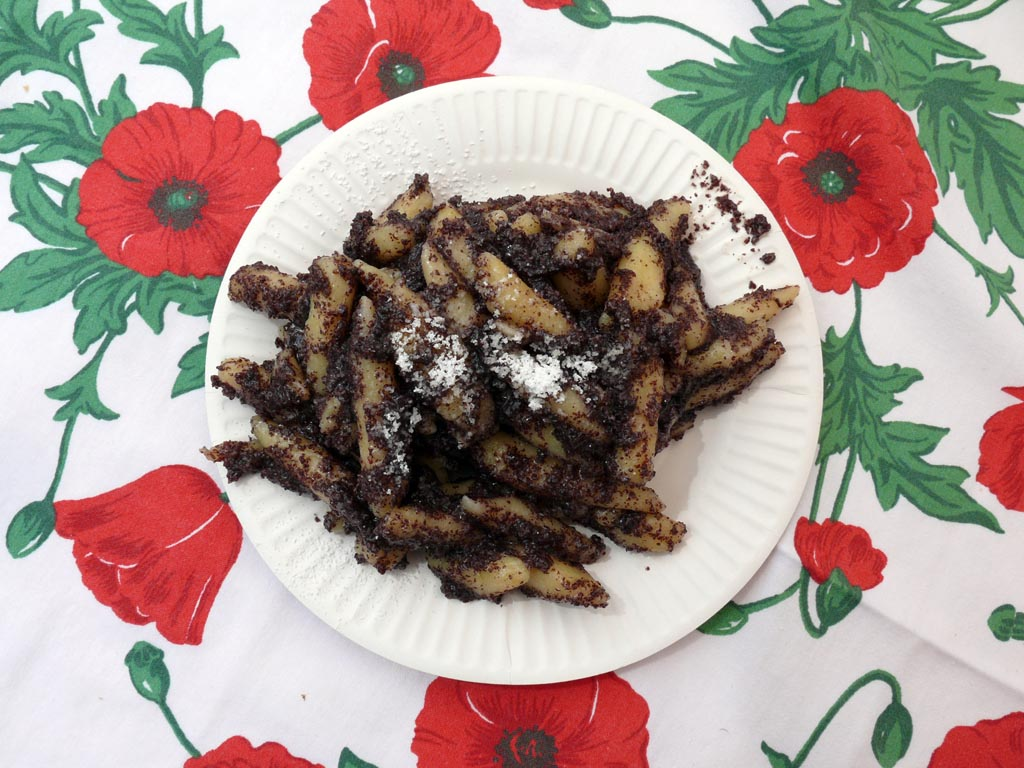
Mohnnudeln, poppy seed noodles

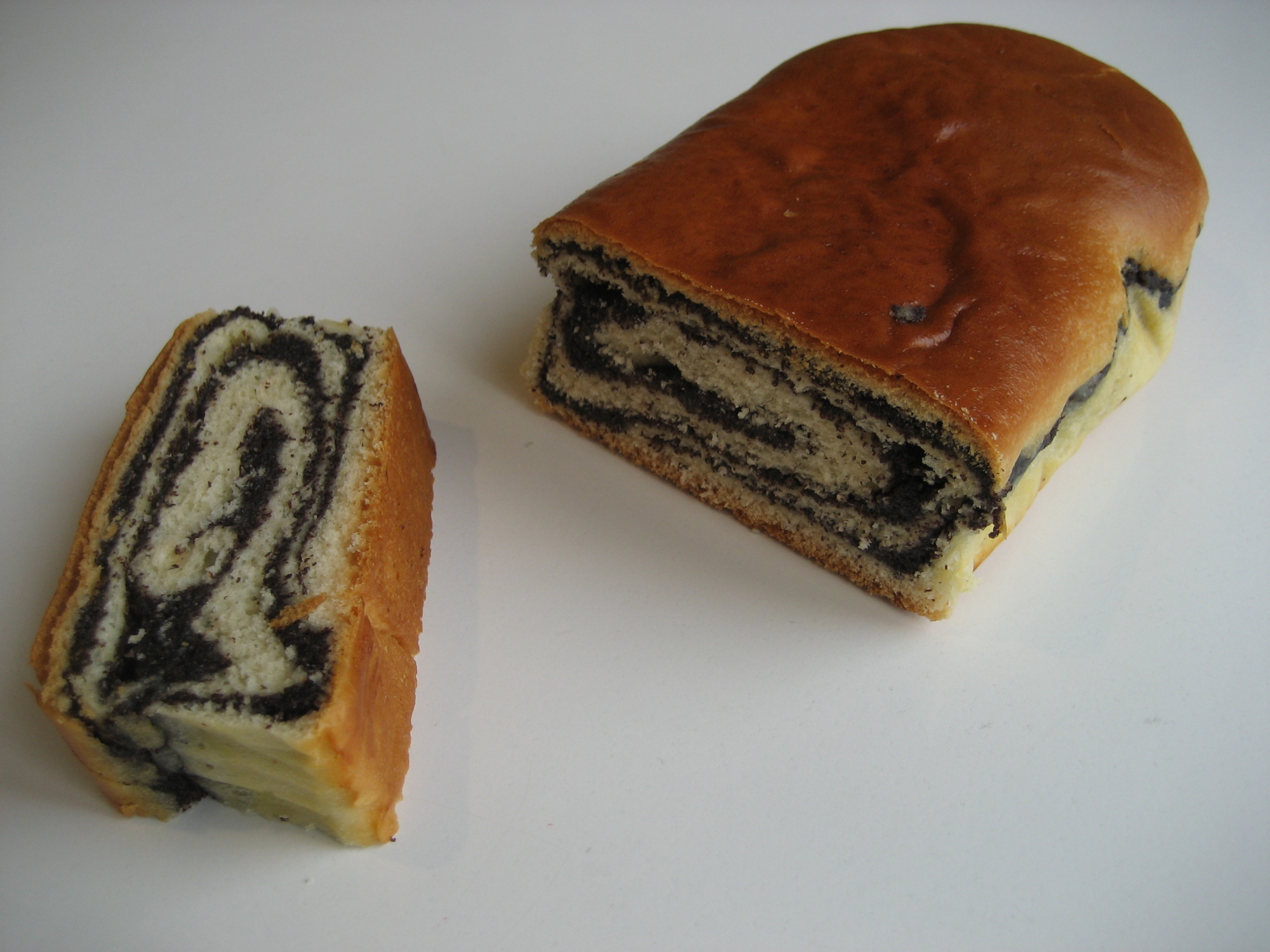
Mohnstrudel

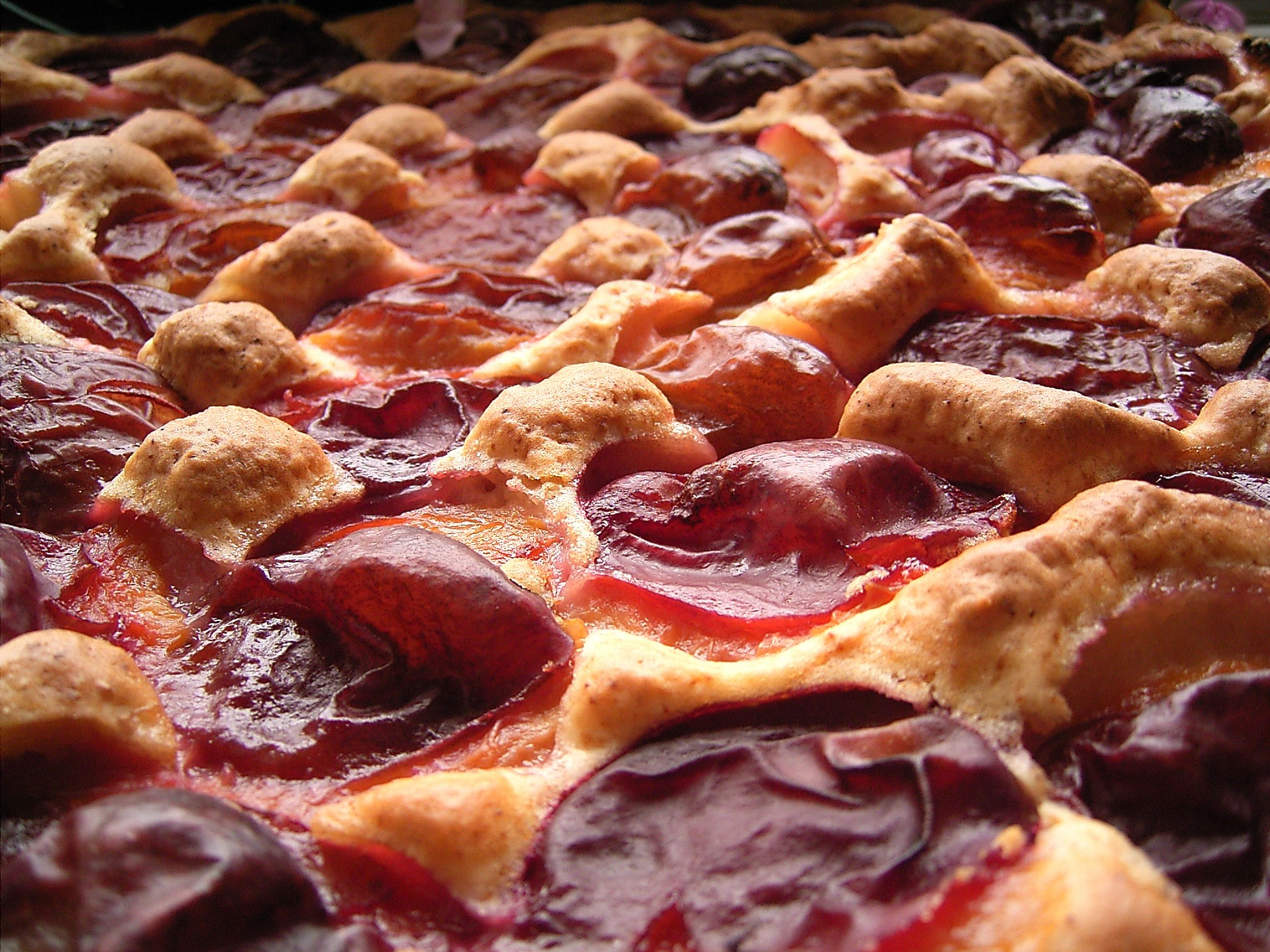
Plum cake

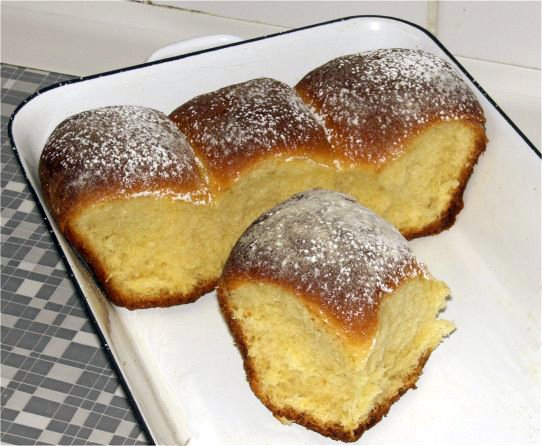
Buchteln

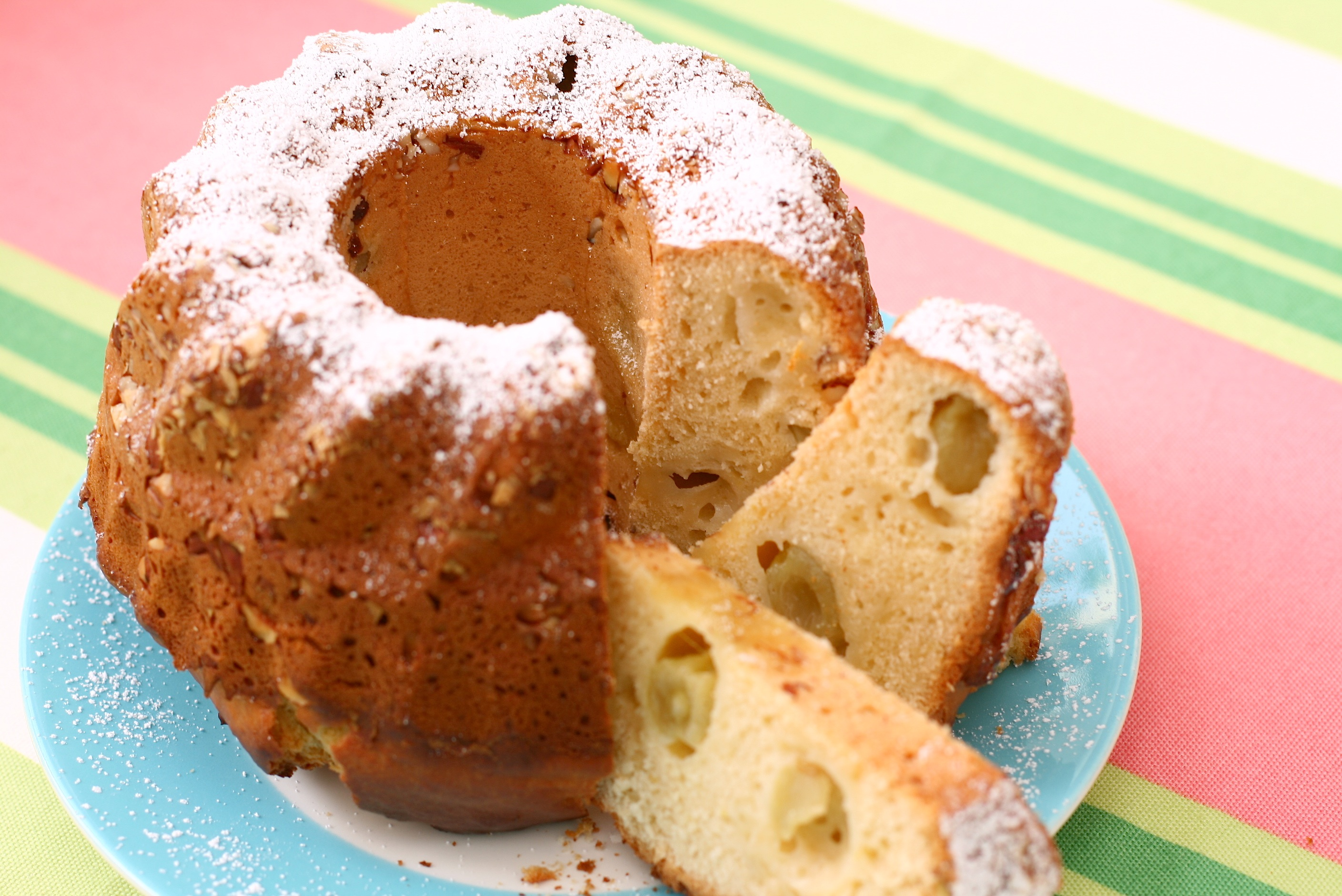
Bundt cake with grapes

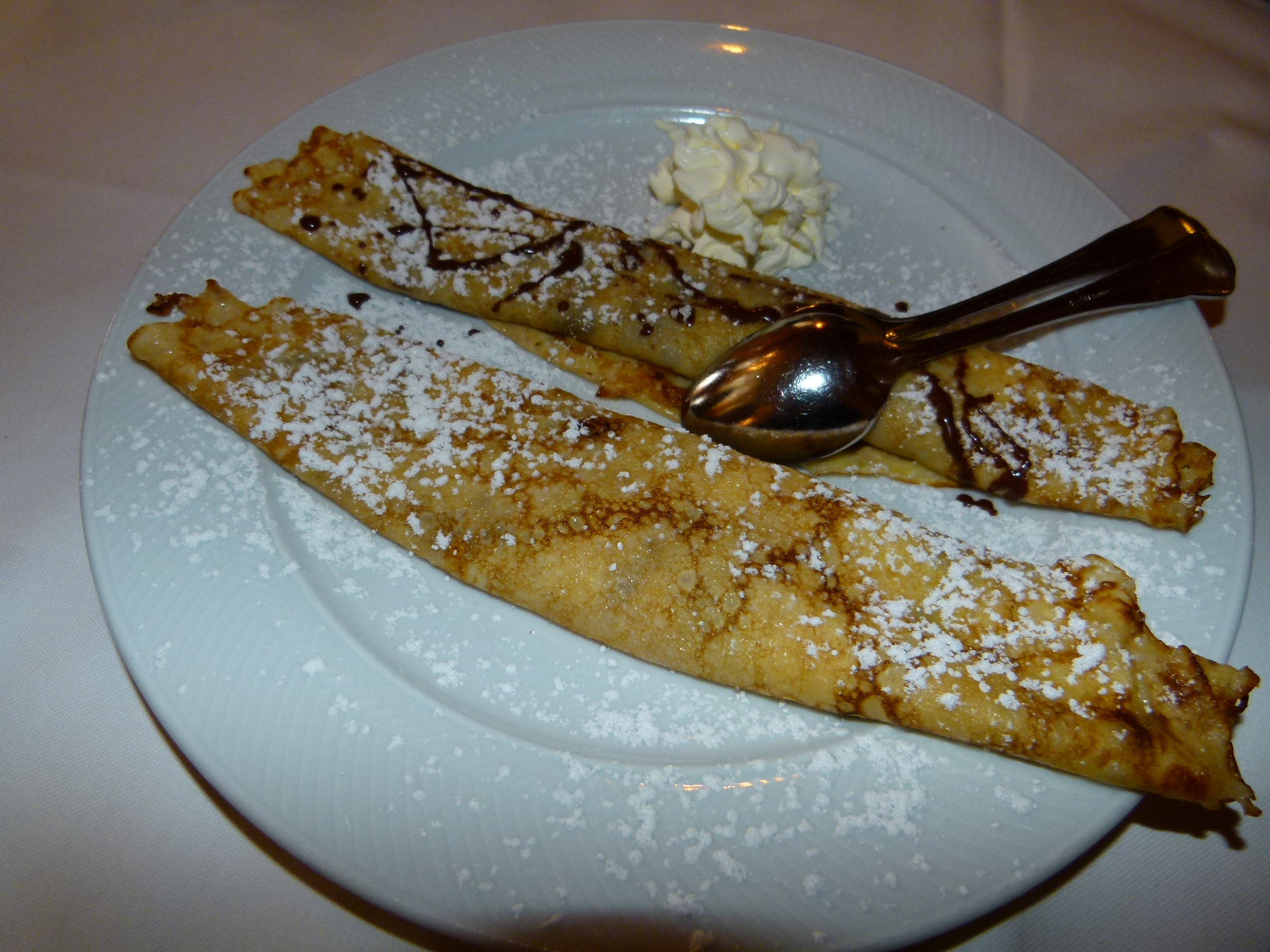
Palatschinken

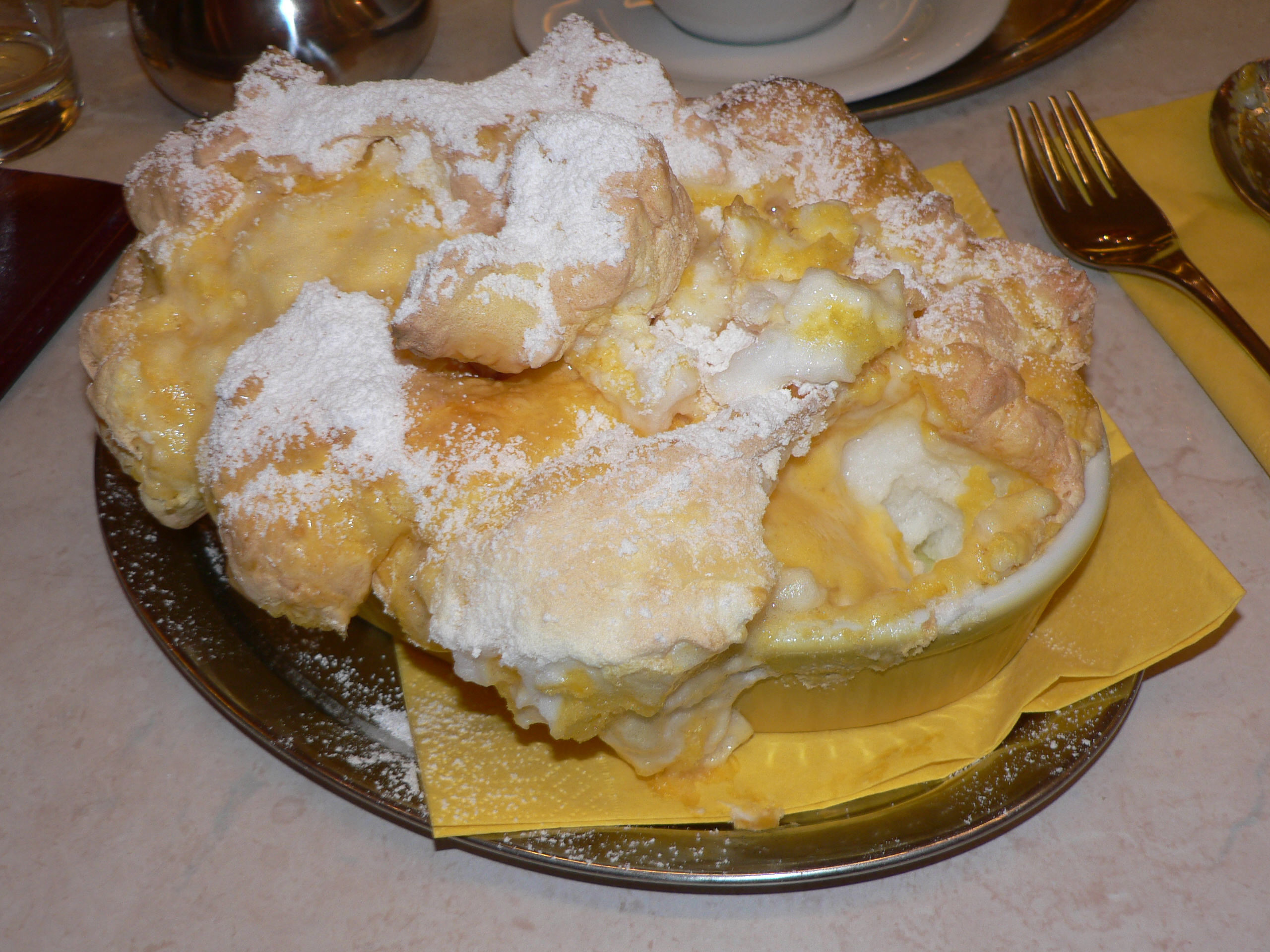
Salzburger Nockerln

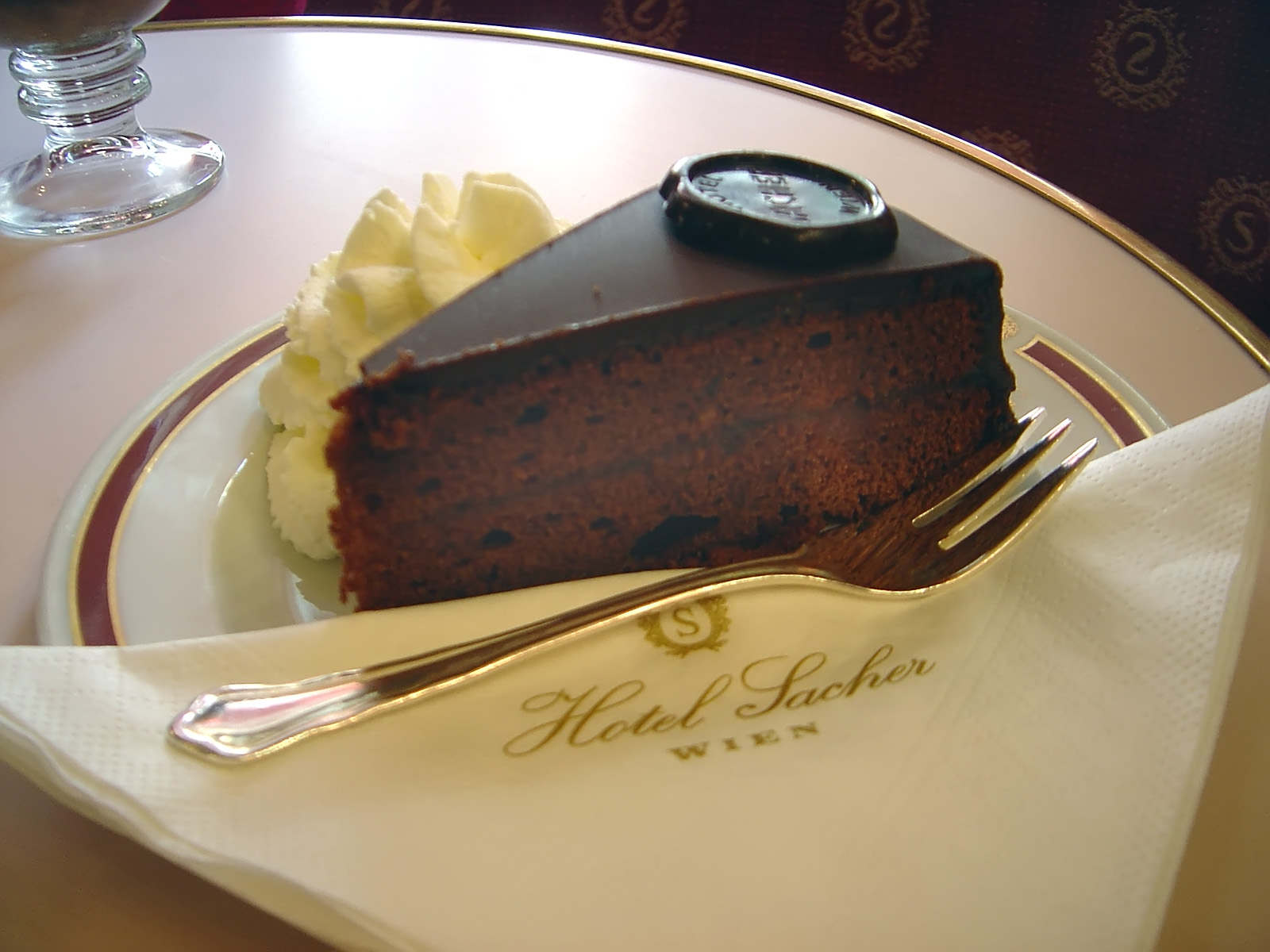
Sachertorte

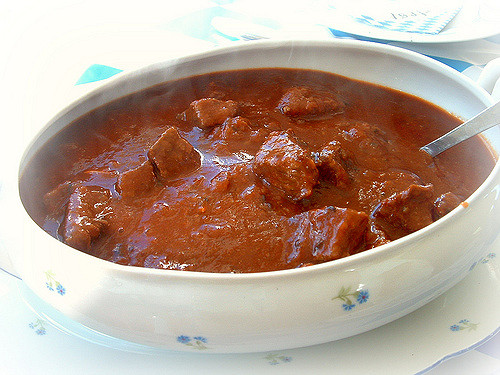
Saftgulasch

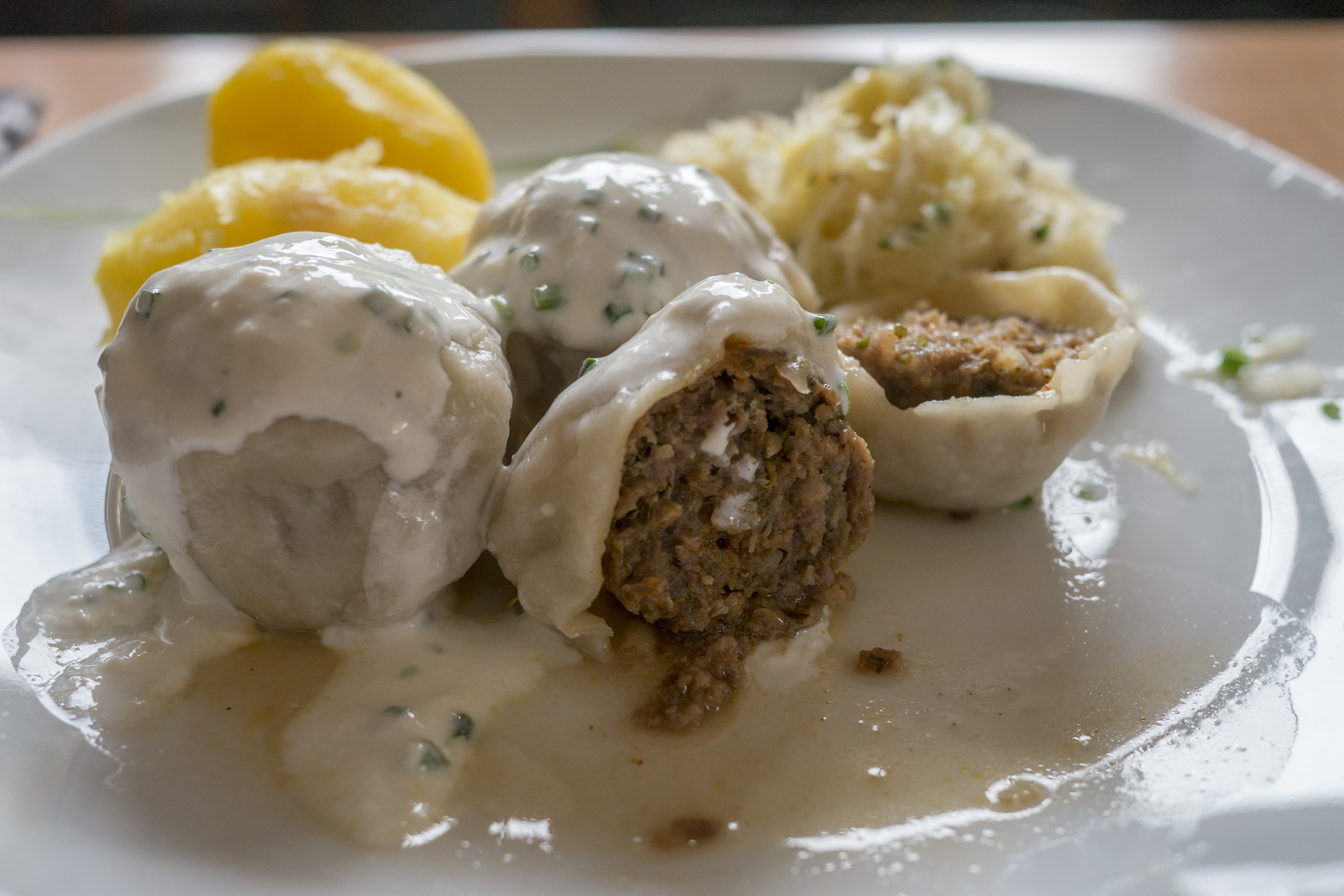
Bratknödel

== See also ==
- Culture of Austria
- Vienna bread, innovative bread style from Vienna
