= Viennese cuisine =

Culinary traditions of Vienna, Austria

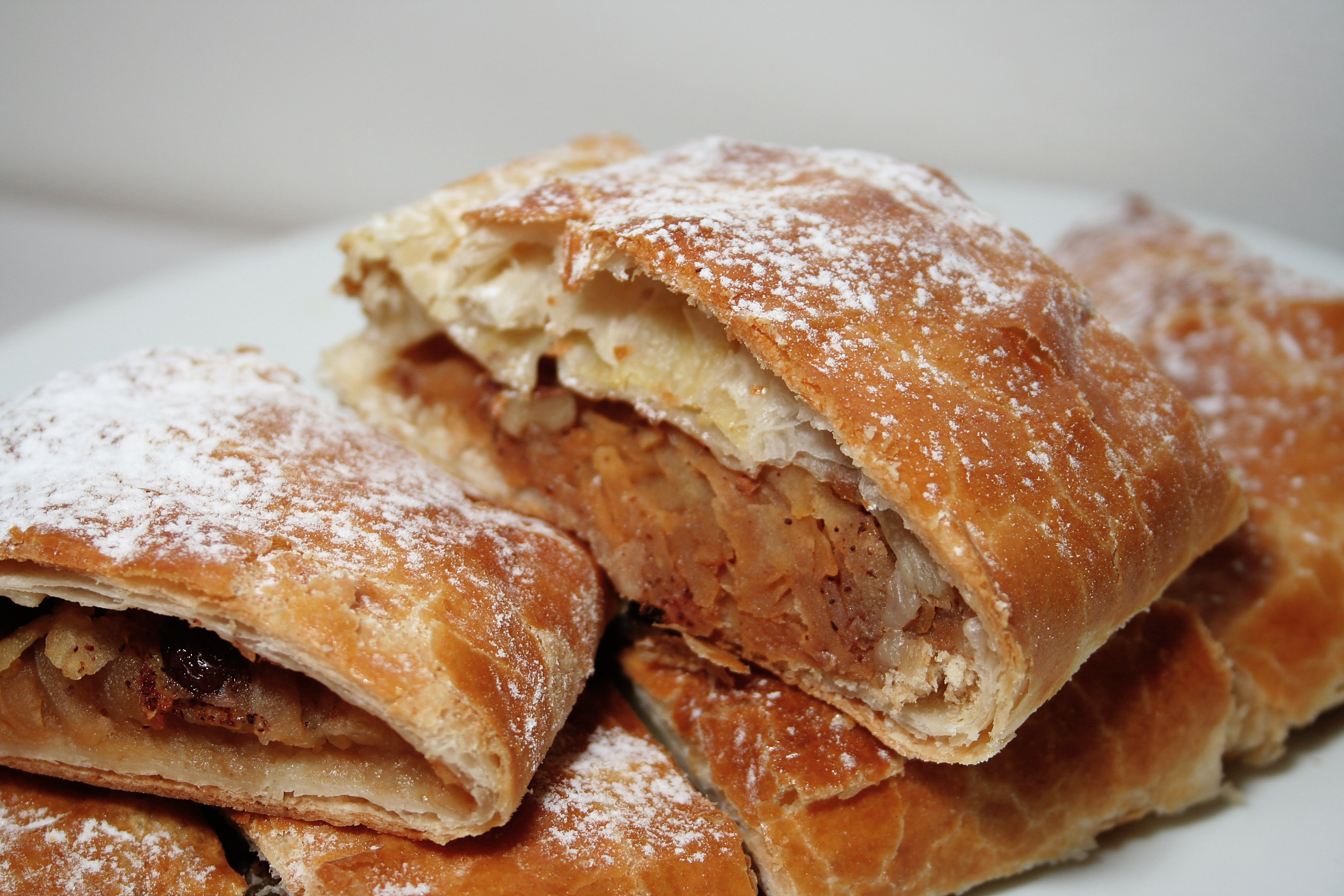
Apfelstrudel, a Viennese speciality

Viennese cuisine is the cuisine of Vienna, Austria. While elements of it have spread throughout the country, other regions have their own variations of Austrian cuisine.

Viennese cuisine is known for Wiener schnitzel and pastries, but includes a wide range of other dishes.

Wiener schnitzel (veal coated in breadcrumbs and fried), Tafelspitz (boiled beef), Beuschel (a ragout containing veal lungs and heart), and Selchfleisch (smoked meat) with sauerkraut and dumplings are typical of its cooking. Sweet Viennese dishes include Apfelstrudel (strudel pastry filled with apples), Millirahmstrudel (milk-cream strudel), Kaiserschmarrn (shredded pancakes served with fruit compotes), and Sachertorte (cake of two layers of chocolate cake with apricot jam in the middle). These and other desserts on offer at the Konditorei of Vienna are generally eaten with coffee in the afternoon. Liptauer, a spread, and Powidl, a base for dumplings, are also popular.

== History ==
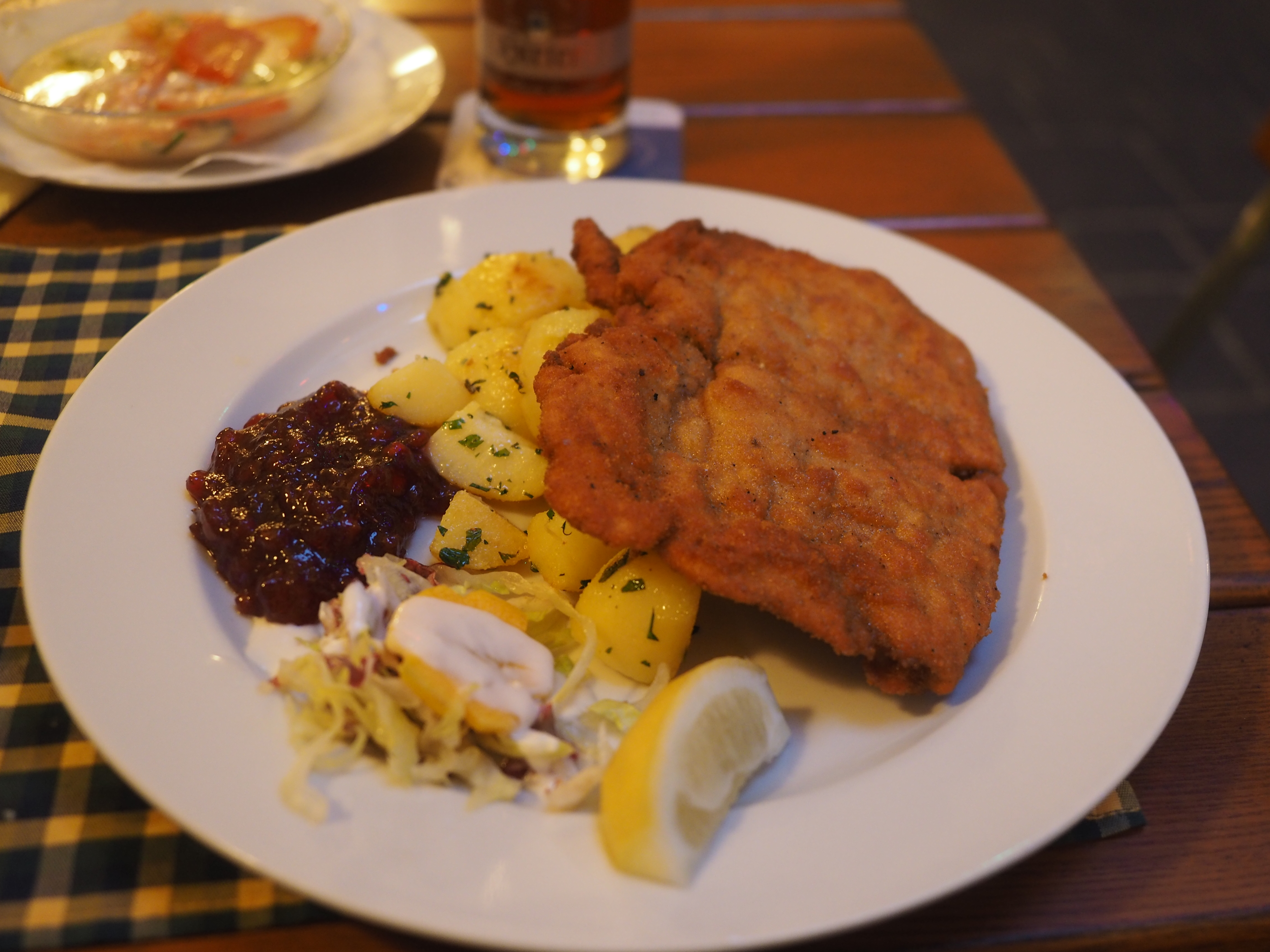
Wiener schnitzel, a popular Viennese dish

The Viennese cooking tradition developed from many different sources: "Viennese cuisine is all about—an eclectic mix of cuisines from Europe and beyond, of all regions and lands that were once part of the monarchy."

Italian influence has been strong since roughly the early 17th century, and can be seen in the names of ingredients and dishes that are still in use today such as risibisi (from the Venetian "risi e bisi"), melanzani, maroni and biscotti. In the 18th century, French cuisine became influential in Vienna and the term "bouillon" became common in middle-class circles for soup. The term "Wiener Küche" (Viennese cuisine) first appeared in German-language cookbooks around the end of the 18th century, and it was mistakenly treated as equivalent to Austrian cuisine.

The croissant is also thought to have originated in Vienna after the defeat of the Turks in the Siege of Vienna.

In the second half of the 19th century, cookbooks started to include Bohemian, Hungarian, Jewish, Polish, and Balkan features in Viennese cuisine. Viennese cooking reflected foods brought in from various parts of the Austro-Hungarian Empire: "Viennese menus usually comprise the same group of dishes, sometimes Austrian in origin but often inherited from the various nationalities of the empire: Hungarian goulash ... wiener schnitzel ... south Slav ćevapčići... crêpe-like Palatschinken (claimed by the Romanians), and Powidltascherl ... from the Czechs, to name but a few."

== Modern Viennese cuisine ==
In modern Vienna, many chefs have begun to combine traditional Viennese dishes with the principles of nouvelle cuisine to create what is known as "Neue Wiener Küche" (New Viennese cuisine). This includes vegetarian food.

Also, Turkish, Jewish, Middle Eastern, and Indian cuisine have influence on the city because of growing immigrant communities.

== Coffee houses ==
The Viennese coffee house is such an important part of the cuisine and culture of Vienna that the concept is listed as "Intangible Cultural Heritage" in the Austrian inventory of the National Agency for the Intangible Cultural Heritage, a part of UNESCO. The Viennese coffee house is described in this inventory as a place "where time and space are consumed, but only the coffee is found on the bill."

== Viennese dishes ==
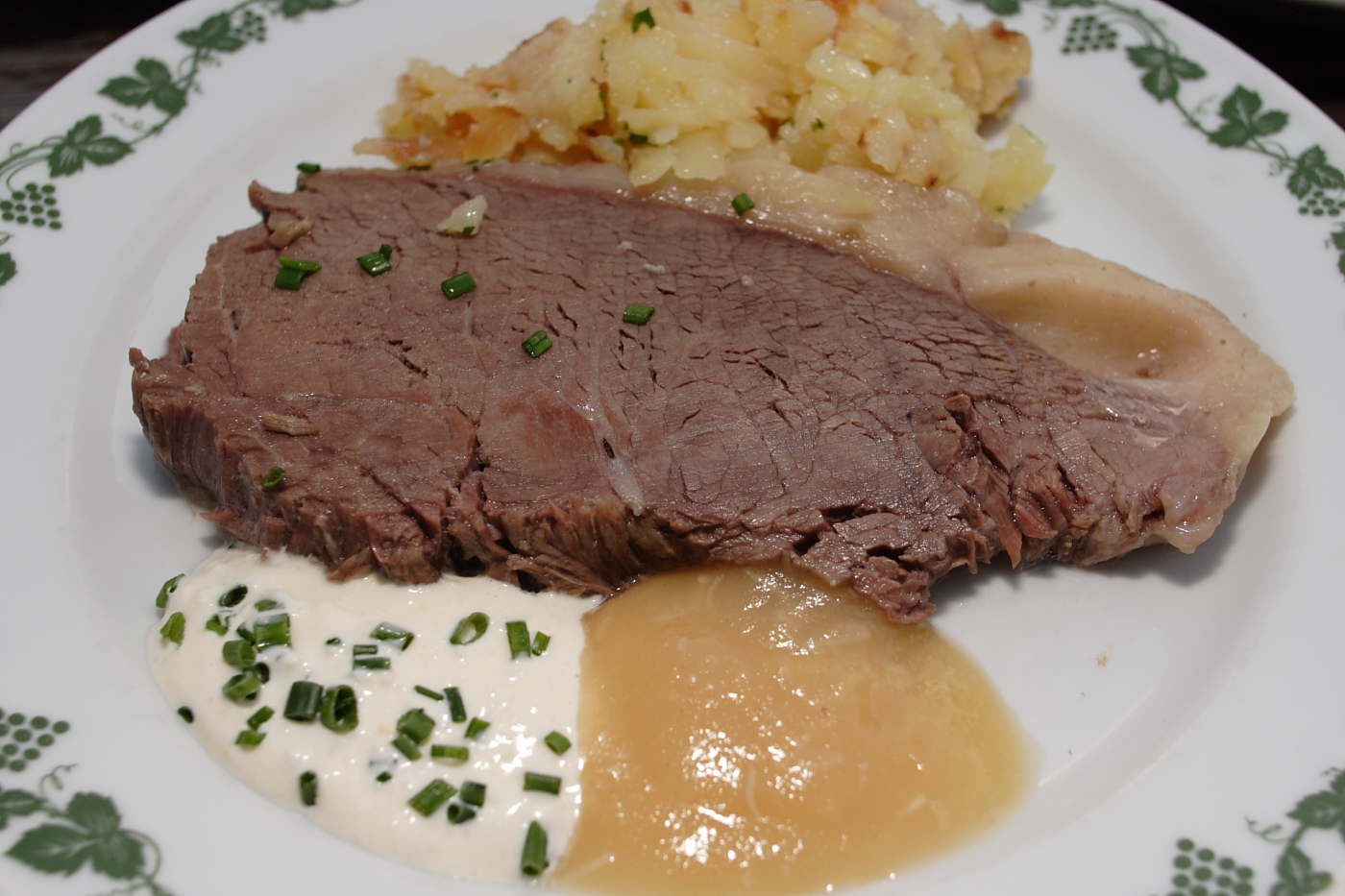
Tafelspitz

Typical Viennese dishes include:

- Apfelstrudel (an apple-filled pastry)
- Topfenstrudel (a quark cheese-filled strudel)
- Palatschinken (Viennese crêpes)
- Kaiserschmarrn (caramelized and shredded pancake)
- Buchteln (from Czech buchty): sweet rolls made of yeast dough, filled, traditionally, with Powidl (or, in some modern variants, with apricot jam) and butter-baked
- Germknödel
- Marillenknödel
- Powidl (from Czech povidla)
- Sachertorte (a chocolate cake)
- Wiener schnitzel
- Backhendl
- Tafelspitz (boiled beef, often served with apple and horseradish sauces)
- Gulasch (a hotpot similar to Hungarian pörkölt; gulyás is stew with more sauce or soup in Hungary)
- Selchfleisch (smoked meat) with Sauerkraut and dumplings
- Rindsuppe (beef soup)
- Beuschel (a ragout containing veal lungs and heart)
- Liptauer cheese

== See also ==
- Vienna bread, the unique and influential style of lighter bread with fresh leavening that developed in Vienna
- Viennoiserie, a French term referring to baked goods in the style of or influenced by Viennese baking
