= Beuschel =

Vienna, Bavaria, and Bohemia stew

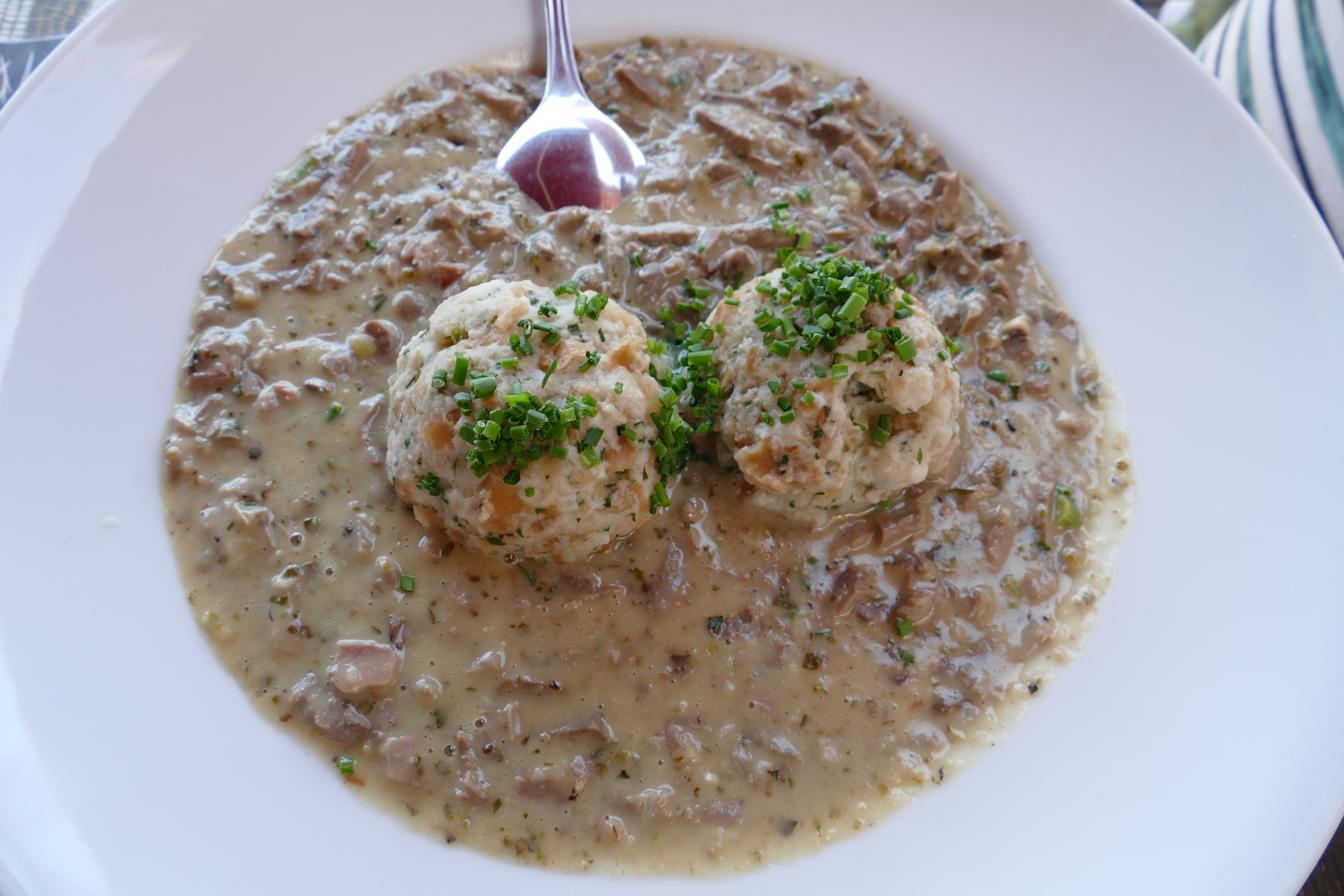
- Veal beuschel with bread dumplings
- Type: Stew
- Course: Main dish
- Place of origin: Austria, Germany, Czechia, Hungary, Switzerland
- Region or state: Vienna, Bavaria, and Bohemia
- Main ingredients: Offal, water, vinegar, sugar, salt, peppercorns, bay leaf onions, cream
- Variations: Numerous

Beuschel (German: [ˈbɔʏʃl̩]) is a dish that is typically a ragout made from lungs and other organs, such as heart, kidneys, spleen, and tongue, from calf, beef, pork, or game. It is often served with a sour cream sauce and bread dumplings. It is a dish of Viennese cuisine but is widespread in all of Austria, Bavaria, and Bohemia.

The word Beuschel (sometimes also called Peuschel) and Lüngerl (Bavarian for "heart, lungs, spleen, and liver") also refer to the upper entrails of a slaughtered animal, including fish.

== Name ==
In Austrian hunting terminology, the term refers to the lungs, liver, heart, spleen, and kidneys of game, known as the "hunter's right." According to the Duden, the word dates back to the early meaning of "Bausch" (swelling), which was used to refer to entrails. According to the Historische Lexikon Wien (Historical Lexicon of Vienna), the term likely derives from "pauschen, bauschen," which means to inflate (the lungs). Starting from Vienna and its surroundings, the term "Beuschel" or "Päuschlein" has also become common in the western federal states and the Egerland in contrast to dialectal terms like "Lünglein," "Lüngel," or "Lüngerl."

== Origin and preparation ==
Beuschel, also known as Beuschl, Beuscherl, Saures Lüngerl, Lungensuppe, or Lungenhaschee, refers to a dish in traditional Viennese, Austrian, Bavarian, and Bohemian cuisine (where it is known as pajšl). Traditional restaurants in Bavaria and Austria often offer beuschel based on their own handed-down recipes. In Swiss cuisine, a calf heart and lung ragout is known as Gschtell, according to the Swiss kitchen encyclopedia Chuchi-Dix. In Upper Franconia, the dish is called Saure Lunge mit Herz or Gschling because it is prepared with vinegar or wine, while in Coburg, it is known as "Gelüng."

Beuschel can be made from nearly all lungs and other organs such as heart, tongue, and kidney from cattle, pigs, or game. Sheep or goat may also be used on rare occasions. Regionally, it can either be prepared using lungs alone or in combination with other organs. Traditionally, it is prepared as a ragout from calf lungs, sometimes supplemented with heart, spleen, liver, and/or tongue, depending on the recipe.

For preparation, the lungs and other organs are simmered in a sour broth made from water, vinegar, sugar, salt, peppercorns, bay leaf, and onions. Afterward, the seasonings are strained out, and the meat is sliced into fine slices or strips. The broth is thickened with a brown roux. To enhance the flavor, some heavy cream or crème fraîche may be added.

Originally, innards, including beuschel, were served as a starter before the main course, known as "Voressen." The classic side dishes in Austria are either bread or napkin dumplings, while in Franconia, potato dumplings or Baumwollene Klöße ("cotton dumplings"), along with green salad, are common.

== Variations ==
- Alt-Wiener Salonbeuschel, consisting of calf heart and lung, refined with goulash juice and heavy cream or sour cream, typically served with napkin or bread dumplings.
- Weinbeuschel only differs by the addition of some red wine, often with a bit of spicy mustard. Weinbeuschel is also available in canned form from the Inzersdorfer company.
- Krustierte Kalbslunge is essentially a classic Beuschel, with the addition of egg yolk and a thicker sauce. The mixture is then allowed to cool, cut into thumb-sized pieces, dipped in egg white and breadcrumbs, and fried in fat. The dish is garnished with parsley and lemon slices.
- Gebratenes Kalbsgeschlinge is described by Magdaléna Dobromila Rettigová as a dish in which lungs, heart, and fatty pork are first boiled, then transformed into a kind of minced roast.
- Beuschelsuppe, also known as Lungensuppe, is a soup preparation in which the lungs are boiled in broth, then sliced into fine strips and returned to the broth.
- Fischbeuschelsuppe, also known as Wiener Karpfenbeuschelsuppe, is a classic dish of Viennese cuisine prepared from the innards of carp (without gall).

== Idioms ==
In colloquial Viennese language, Beuschel is used as a synonym for lungs or other innards. "Da haut’s dir’s Beuschel aussi" describes a coughing fit after the first drag of a cigarette. A "Beuschelreißer" is a slightly stronger cigarette. A "Beuscheltelefon" refers to a stethoscope.
