= Backhendl =

Austrian fried chicken dish

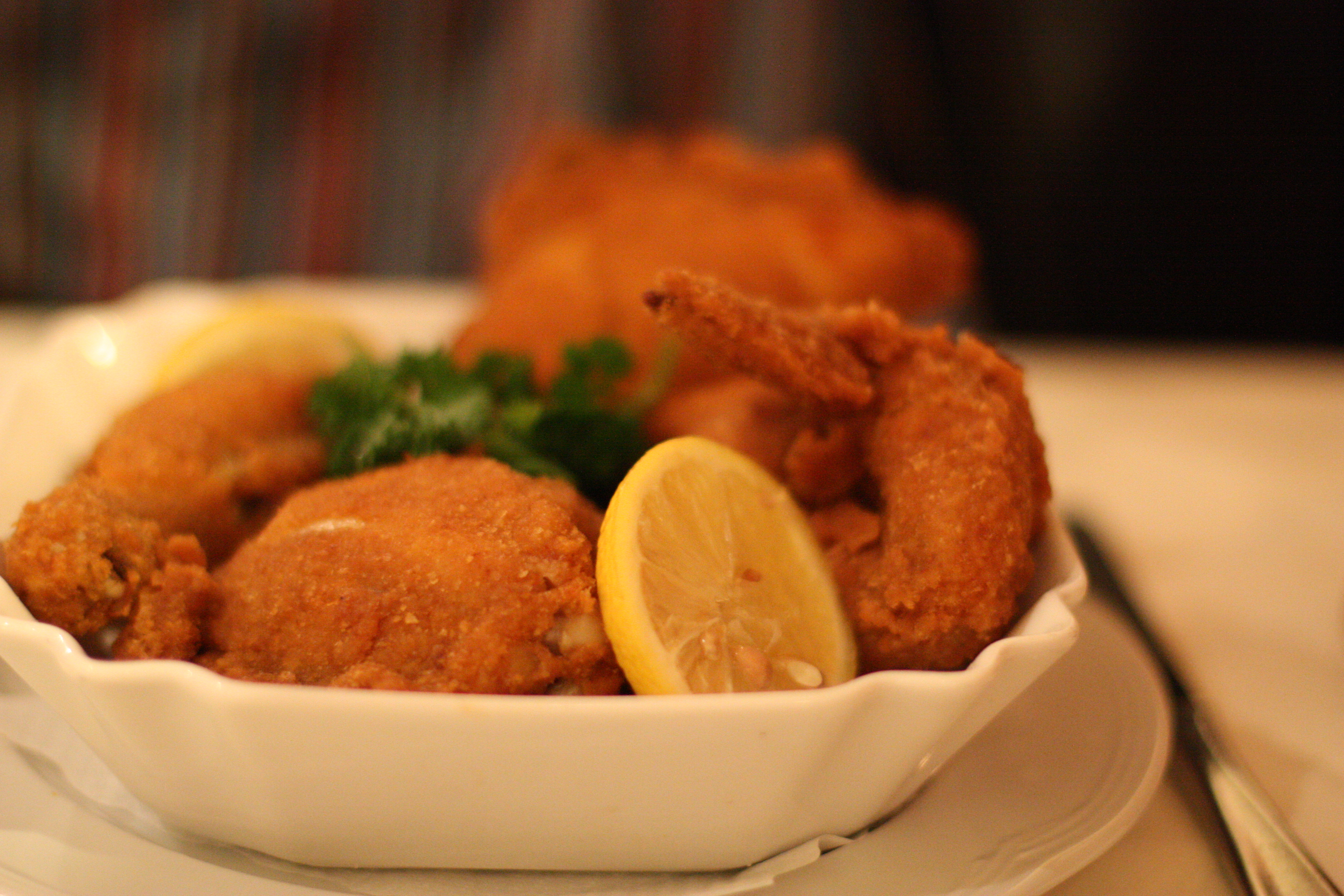
Backhendl

Backhendl or Wiener Backhendl (English: Viennese fried chicken), has been a specialty of Viennese cuisine since the 18th century. It consists of prepared and spiced portions of chicken, which are breaded and crispy deep fried. Often served with a lemon wedge on the side.

Originally, the preparation of this dish has been a breaded and baked chicken, since only the Viennese upper class would have had access to fried foods.

== See also ==
- List of chicken dishes
- List of deep fried foods
