= Strudel =

Type of layered pastry

- A selection of strudels in Café Kröll, Innsbruck, Austria
- Type: Pastry
- Place of origin: Austrian Empire
- Region or state: Austria; Switzerland; Italy; Germany; Croatia; Bosnia and Herzegovina; Poland; Ukraine; Romania; Czechia; Slovakia; Slovenia; Hungary; Serbia
- Main ingredients: Filo pastry

Strudel (/ˈstruːdəl/ STROO-dəl, German: [ˈʃtʁuːdl̩]) is a type of layered pastry with a filling that is usually sweet, though savoury fillings are also common. It became popular in the 18th century throughout the Austrian Empire. Strudel is traditional to Austrian, German and Swiss cuisine. In Italy it is recognized as a prodotto agroalimentare tradizionale (PAT) of South Tyrol. A similar pastry is known as závin in Czech and Slovak cuisine, and zavitek in Slovenian cuisine.

The oldest strudel recipes (a Millirahmstrudel and a turnip strudel) are from 1696, in a handwritten cookbook at the Wienbibliothek im Rathaus (formerly Wiener Stadtbibliothek). The pastry was derived from, and in-turn influenced, the Hungarian rétes, which was traditionally a variation of the Ottoman baklava.

== Etymology ==
Strudel is an English loanword from German. The word derives from the German word Strudel, which in Middle High German literally means 'whirlpool' or 'eddy'.

== History ==
The origins of the strudel are believed to lie in the Hungarian rétes, which developed from the Turkish baklava during Ottoman rule in Hungary. Traditionally, the Hungarian rétes was made using the same method as baklava, layering paper-thin sheets of dough with filling. The strudel, with its distinctive rolled form, developed in the Austrian Empire around the turn of the 18th century.

== Strudelteig pastry ==
Traditional strudel pastry, known as Strudelteig, differs from puff pastry in that it is very elastic. It is made from flour with a high gluten content, water, oil, and salt, with no sugar added. The dough is worked vigorously, rested, and then rolled out and stretched by hand very thinly with the help of a clean linen tea towel or kitchen paper. There are numerous techniques for manually pulling strudel dough. One method is to roll the dough thin before laying it over the back of the hands and drawing it thin by pulling the hands apart from one another. Purists say that it should be so thin that you can read a newspaper through it. A legend has it that the Austrian Emperor's perfectionist cook decreed that it should be possible to read a love letter through it. The thin dough is laid out on a tea towel, and the filling is spread on it. The dough with the filling on top is rolled up carefully with the help of the tea towel and baked in the oven.

== Varieties ==
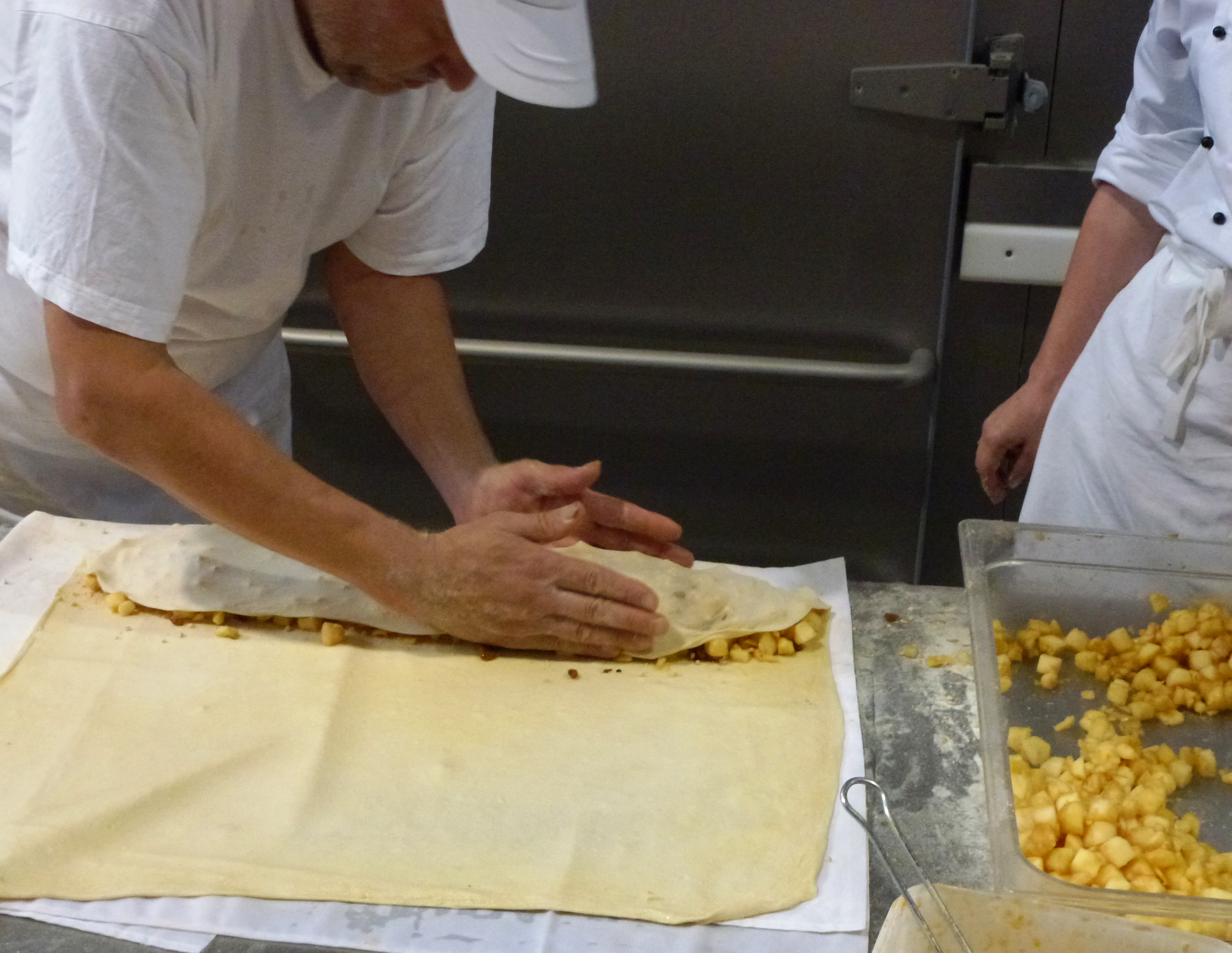
The dough is rolled or stretched thin; then it is filled and rolled.

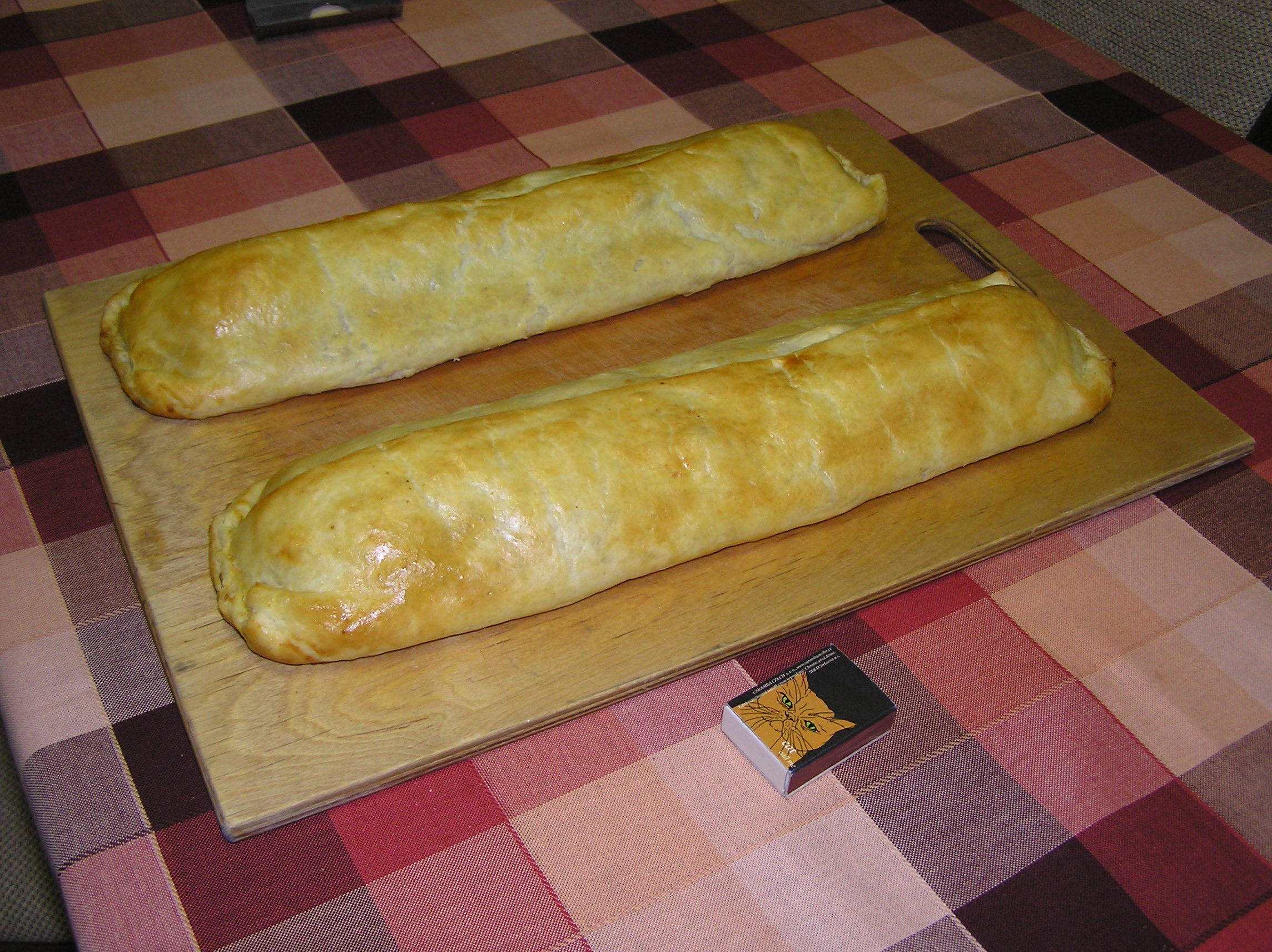
Two baked strudels

The best-known strudels are apple strudel (Apfelstrudel in German) and Topfenstrudel (with sweet soft quark cheese, in Austrian German Topfen), followed by the Millirahmstrudel (milk-cream strudel, Milchrahmstrudel, filled with cubes of bread soaked in a sweet mixture based on milk and cream). Other strudel types include sour cherry (Weichselstrudel), sweet cherry, nut filled (Nussstrudel), apricot strudel, plum strudel, poppy seed strudel (Mohnstrudel), rhubarb strudel and raisin strudel. There are also savoury strudels incorporating spinach, cabbage, potato, pumpkin, and sauerkraut, and versions containing meat fillings such as the Lungenstrudel or Fleischstrudel.

In Hungary, the most common fillings include raisin-cottage cheese (túrós rétes), sour cherries (meggyes rétes), apples (almás rétes), poppy seeds (mákos rétes), walnuts (diós rétes), though sour cream and tejberizs (sweet rice porridge) also used to be common.

=== Apple ===
Regional apple varieties prevail with choice based on a firm to semi-firm texture once baked. Tasting notes are acidic with apple flavour. Varieties include Belle de Boskoop, Stayman Winesap, Gravenstein, Newtown Pippin, Bramley's Seedling, Karmijn de Sonnaville, Zabergau Reinette, Yellow Transparent, Calville Blanc, Granny Smith, Glockenapfel, Jonagold, Jonathan, Northern Spy, and Rhode Island Greening.

=== Savoury cabbage ===
Strudel (in Yiddish: שטרודל, pron. shtrudl) in general is also associated with Ashkenazi Jewish cuisine, particularly of German, Swiss, and Austrian Ashkenazi Jews. Apple and raisin filling is popular, but cabbage has historically also been used as a filling for a savoury strudel. The cabbage is braised or caramelized with sliced onions and caraway seeds, sometimes with added sugar. Recipes may include chopped walnuts. Cabbage strudel (káposztás rétes in Hungarian) is especially associated with the cuisine of Hungarian Jews.

The 19th-century American writer Alice Lee Moqué recorded an encounter with savoury strudel, ordered mistakenly as a dessert, in her account of her travels through Dalmatia (modern-day Croatia), at the Hotel Petka in Gravosa (Gruz). Assuming "Sprudel" was a type of "German sweetcake", Moqué's travel partner carelessly ordered a "Kraut sprudel", only to find the sweet pie crust was filled with "the most awful mixture" of hot, boiled cabbage.

Observant Hungarian Jews would make the dough with oil and serve Strudel for Simchat Torah and Purim, to match the customary drink imbibed at these celebrations.

== Gallery ==
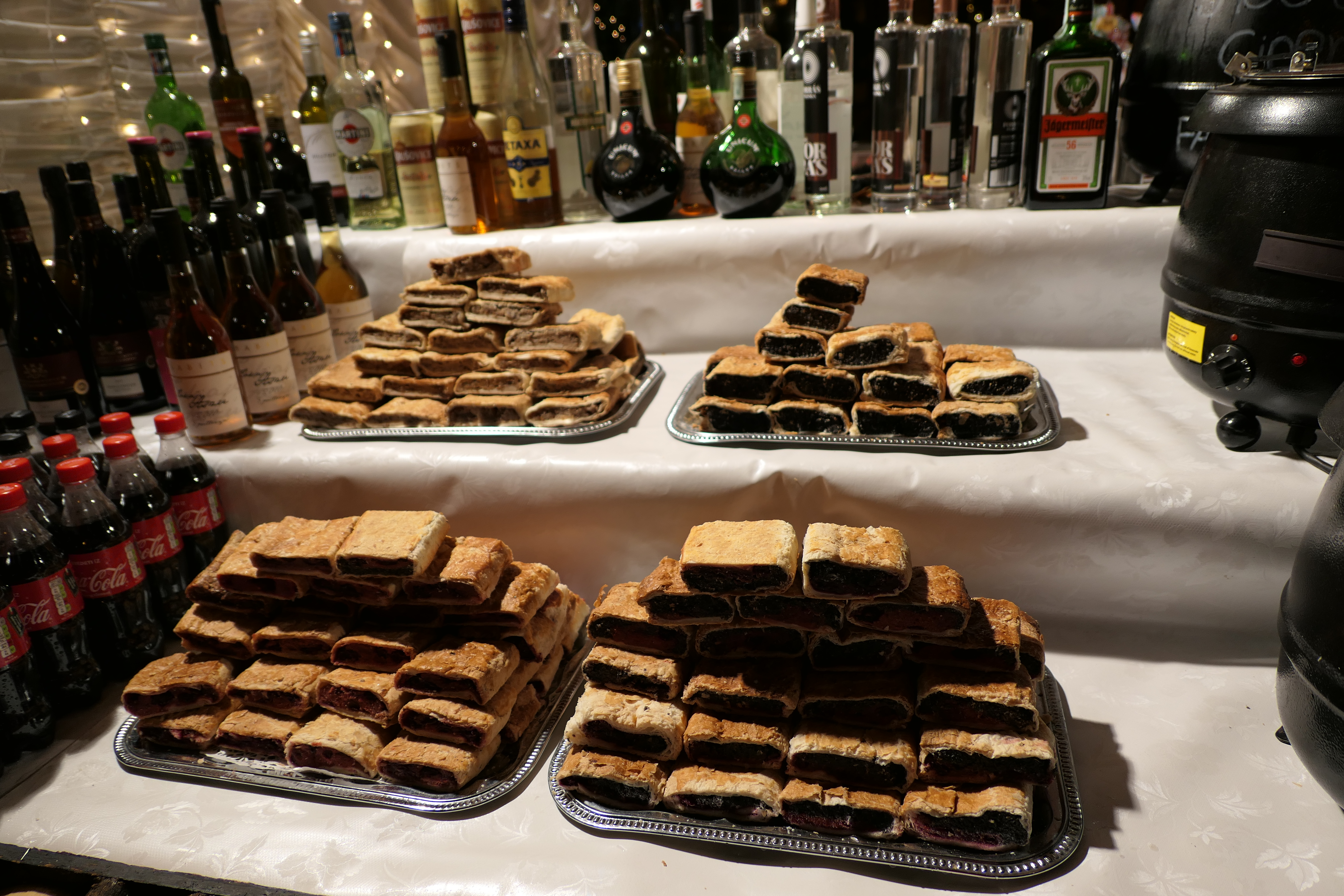
Strudels in Budapest

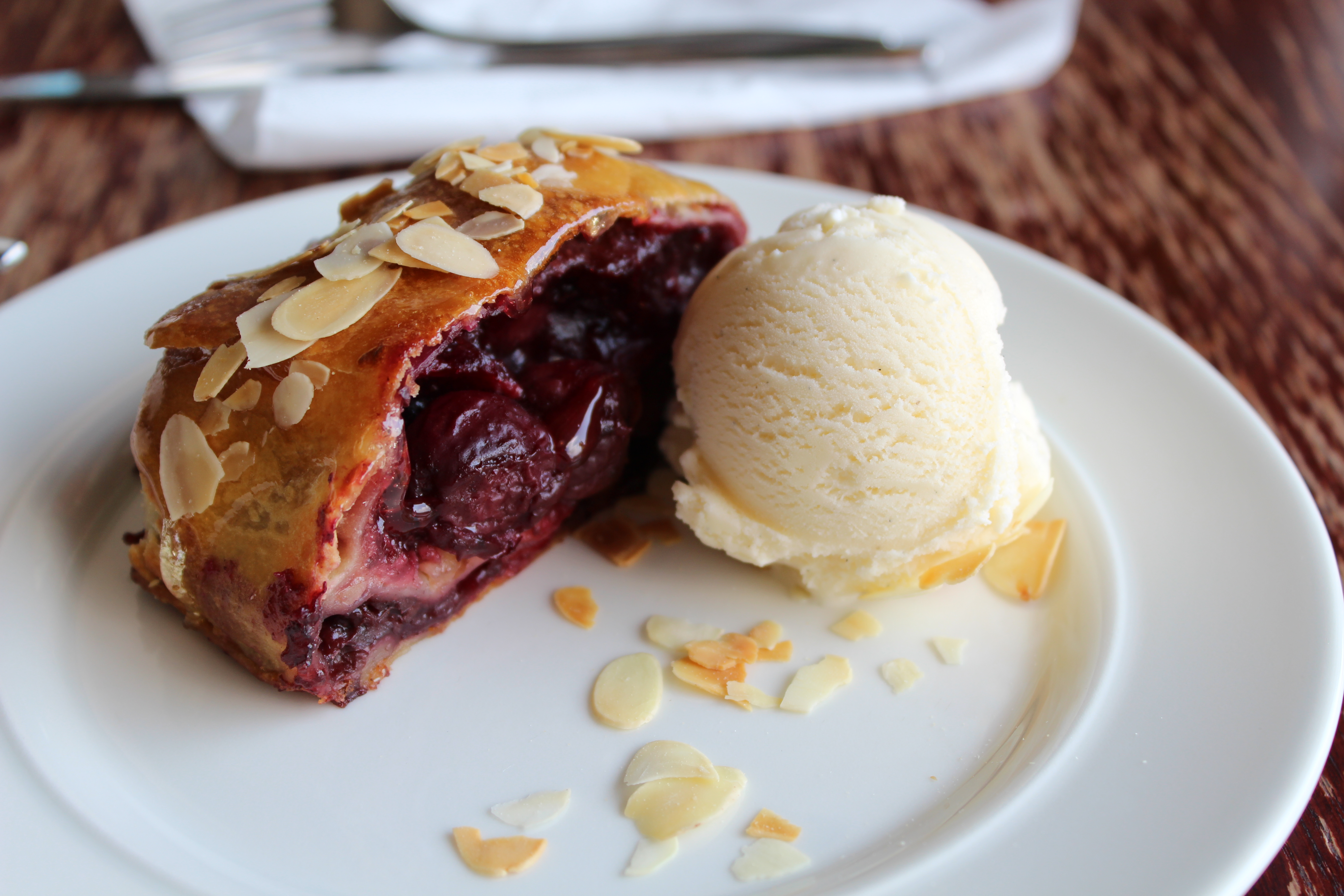
Cherry strudel served with ice cream

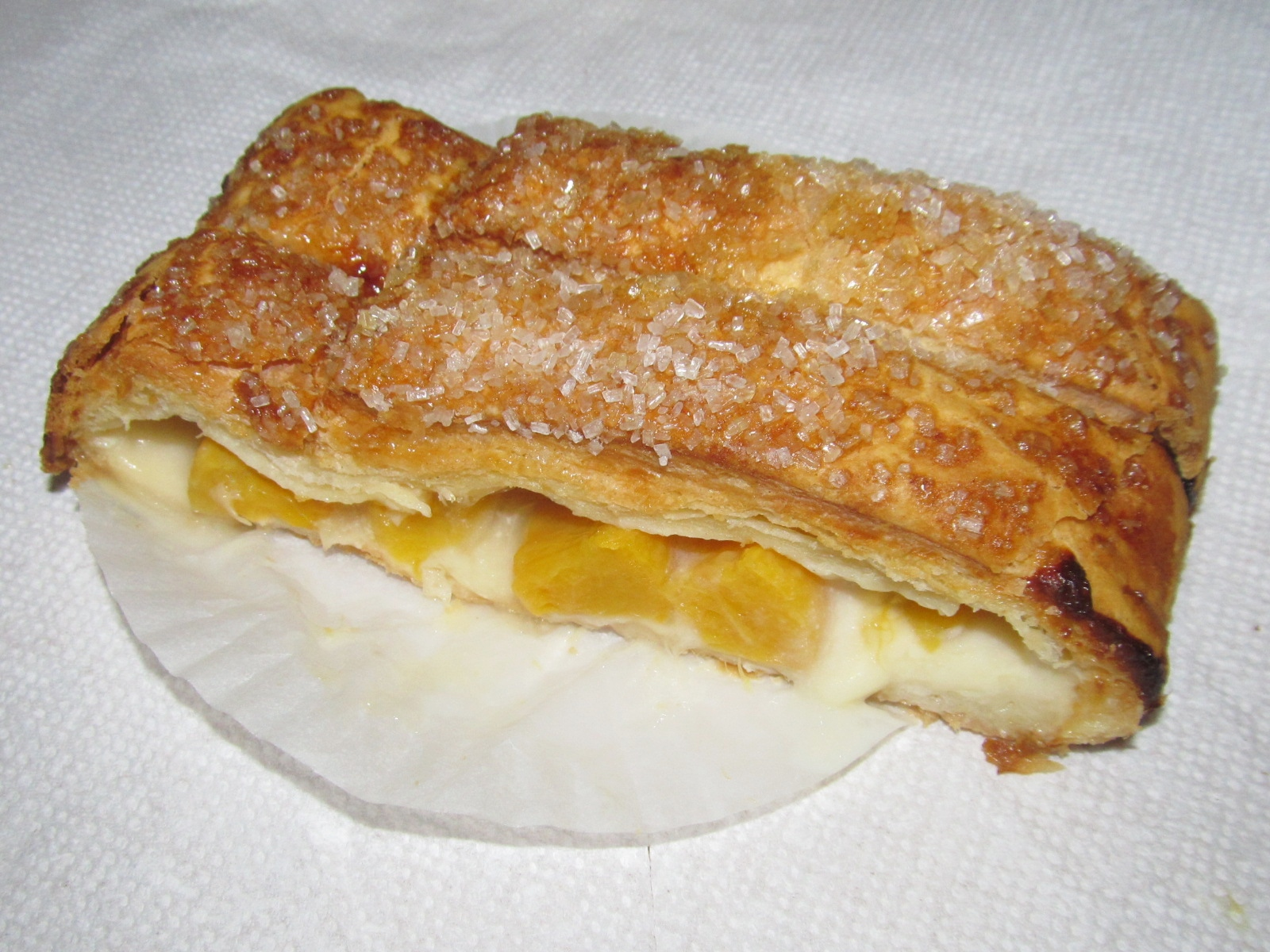
Peach strudel

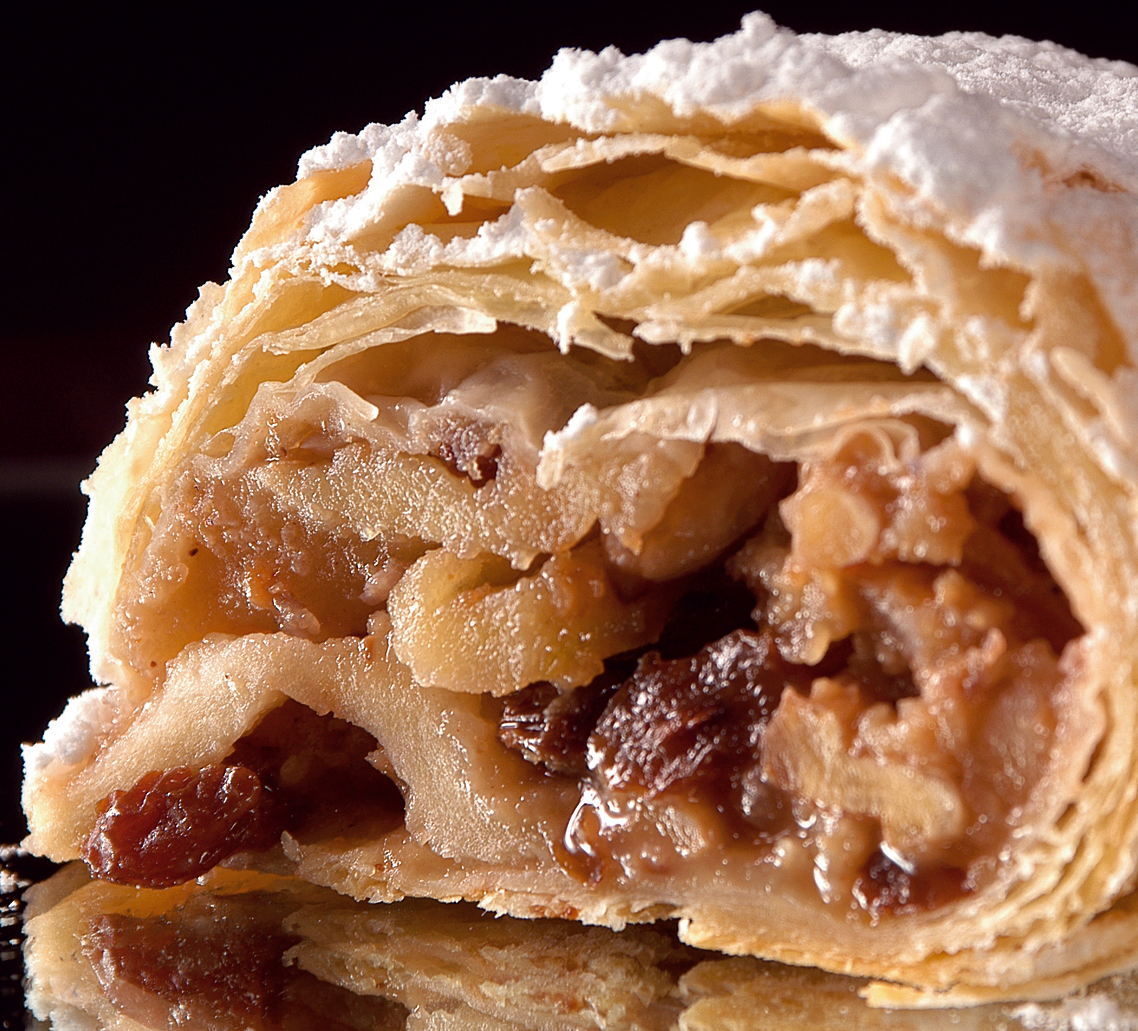
Wiener apple strudel

== In culture ==
=== Symbol @ in Hebrew ===
In Hebrew colloquial speech, the symbol @ in email addresses is called "shtrudel" (שטרודל), a German loan word for the pastry. There is also an official Hebrew language word for the @ symbol: "keruchit" (כרוכית), this also being the formal word for the strudel pastry. In both cases, the allusion is to the spiral form of strudel. (Other languages have evolved a name for the symbol in a similar way, by borrowing a food term, for example: rollmops in Czech and Slovak; and kanelbulle in Swedish.)

=== Hungarian tradition ===
In Hungary, rétes, a traditional Hungarian strudel is consumed at Farsang or New Year, because it is believed to bring good luck and a long life. It is also the subject of several traditional Hungarian nursery rhymes, two of which are Aki nem lép egyszerre ('who doesn't match the pace') and Tekeredik a rétes ('the snake coils'):

Who doesn't match the pace,
No rétes for the evening,
For strudel is very good,
It's what a soldier needs
We're not going far
Only to the edge of the world
We won't be staying there long either
Only for twelve hours

— Traditional. "Aki nem lép egyszerre" ('who doesn't match the pace')

The snake coils,
Wants to be a rétes,
The rétes coils,
Wants to be a snake

— Traditional. "Tekeredik a rétes" ('the snake coils')

"The snake coils" is sung while children do a special circle dance, imitating the coiling and shapeshifting of the snake.

== See also ==
- Apple strudel
- List of pastries
- List of stuffed dishes
- Milk-cream strudel
- Turnover
