= Milk-cream strudel =

Austrian pastry

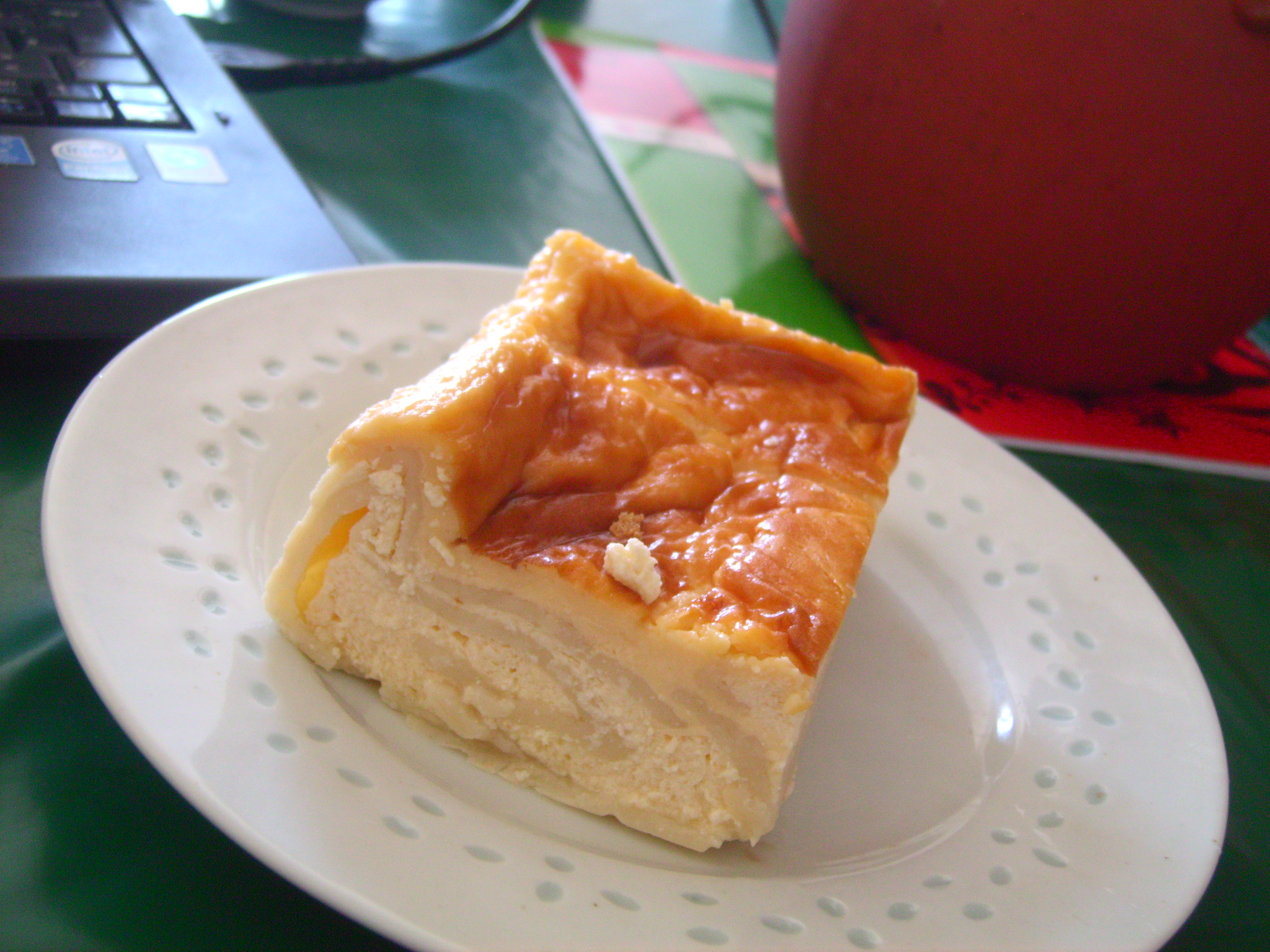
- Type: Strudel
- Place of origin: Austria
- Region or state: Vienna
- Main ingredients: Strudel dough, cream, egg yolks, almonds, sugar, milk, egg whites, raisins

The milk-cream strudel (Viennese German: Millirahmstrudel; Standard German: Milchrahmstrudel) is a traditional Viennese strudel and a popular pastry in Austria and many countries in Europe that once belonged to the Austro-Hungarian Empire (1867–1918). It is an oven-baked pastry dough stuffed with a filling made from diced, milk-soaked bread rolls, egg yolk, powdered sugar, butter, quark, vanilla, lemon zest, raisins and cream and is served in the pan with hot vanilla sauce.

== History ==
The first documented strudel recipe was a recipe of a milk-cream strudel (Millirahmstrudel) from 1696 in Vienna, a handwritten recipe at the Viennese City Library.

A Viennese legend credits Franz Stelzer (1842–1913), who owned a small inn in Breitenfurt near Vienna, for the invention of the Millirahmstrudel, maintaining that the pastry made him a very famous and rich man.

== See also ==
- Apple strudel
- List of pastries
- List of stuffed dishes
