= Skiwasser =

Soft drink

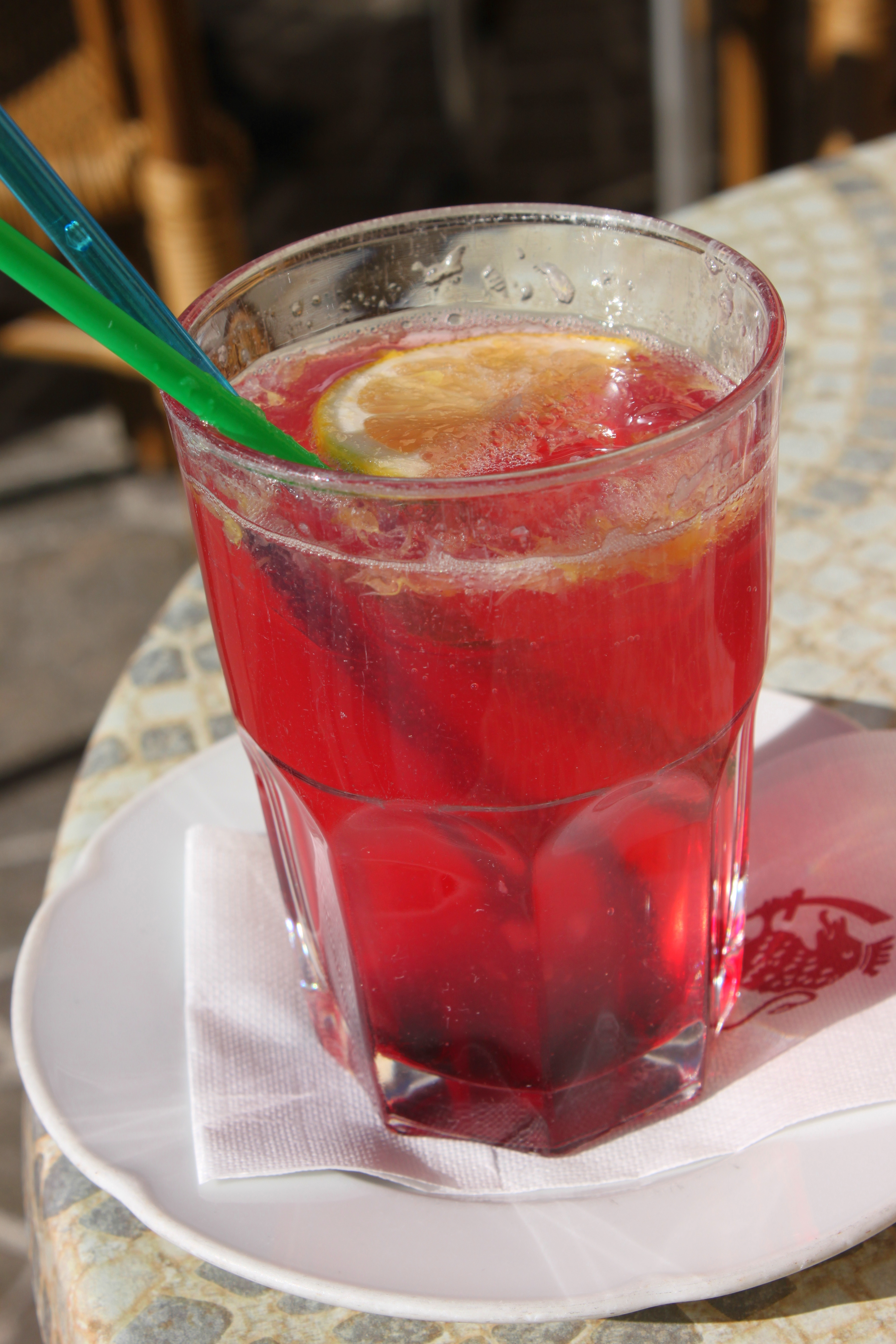
Skiwasser with lemon

Skiwasser or schiwasser is an alcohol-free soft drink, in the simplest and original version based on raspberry syrup, lemon juice and water. It has its origin in the winter sports resorts of Austrian Tyrol, as part of the beverage offer on ski huts or lodges. Typically, it has red-pink color. Syrup mixtures are also commercially available, which only need to be diluted with water, similar to other soft drinks in the catering trade. In addition, variants of the same name prepared from fresh fruits are offered, even as cocktail creations with alcohol.
